= Admiral Harvey =

Admiral Harvey may refer to:

- Edward Harvey (1783–1865), British Royal Navy admiral
- Eliab Harvey (1758–1830), British Royal Navy admiral
- Henry Harvey (1743–1810), British Royal Navy admiral
- John C. Harvey Jr. (born 1951), U.S. Navy admiral
- John Harvey (Royal Navy officer, born 1772) (1772–1837), British Royal Navy admiral
- Thomas Harvey (Royal Navy officer) (1775–1841), British Royal Navy vice admiral
