= John Harvey (Royal Navy officer, born 1772) =

Royal Navy Admiral (1772–1837)

Admiral Sir John Harvey KCB
- Born: 1772; Eastry, Kent
- Died: 17 September 1837 (aged 64–65); Upper Deal, Kent
- Military career
- Allegiance: Great Britain; United Kingdom
- Branch: Royal Navy
- Service years: 1780s–1819
- Rank: Admiral
- Commands: HMS Prince of Wales; HMS Southampton; HMS Amphitrite; HMS Agamemnon; HMS Canada; HMS Leviathan; HMS Royal Sovereign; Leeward Islands Station
- Conflicts: French Revolutionary Wars; Battle of Groix; Invasion of Trinidad (1797); Napoleonic Wars; Battle of Cape Finisterre (1805)
- Awards: Knight Commander of the Order of the Bath

Admiral Sir John Harvey KCB (1772 – 17 September 1837) was a Royal Navy officer who served in the French Revolutionary and Napoleonic Wars and held numerous commands and served in several actions during his long and distinguished career. Harvey was the eldest son of Captain John Harvey who was a distinguished officer of the eighteenth century who was killed in action at the battle of the Glorious First of June.

== Early career ==
Born in 1772 at Eastry, Kent to Captain Harvey and Judith Harvey née Wise, Harvey was raised with his brothers at home and in the 1780s joined his uncle Captain Henry Harvey's ship HMS Rose off the North American station to train as a midshipman. His service continued until 1790 when at 18 he was promoted to lieutenant. Actively employed at the outbreak of the French Revolutionary Wars, Harvey was aided by family influence and gained command of the sloop HMS Actif on 5 September 1794 in the West Indies. Within three months, supported by the influence gained from his father's death at the Glorious First of June in the same year, Harvey was made post-captain, receiving promotion on 16 December. His brother Edward Harvey also received promotion to midshipman at the same time.

Thanks to family influence Harvey gained a prime commission in January 1795, serving aboard his uncle's flagship the second-rate HMS Prince of Wales as captain. In her, Harvey was extensively engaged during the following year, seeing action at the victory of the Battle of Groix where three enemy ships were taken and supporting the invasion of Quiberon Bay by Sir John Brolase Warren in 1796. In early 1797 Harvey followed his uncle to Trinidad, and supported the invasion of the island, helping capture it and the Spanish garrison there. Harvey was chosen to be sent home with the dispatches telling of the victory. Not long after arriving in England, Harvey married his first cousin in Elizabeth Bradly(1776-1853) of Sandwich, Kent.

== Napoleonic Wars ==
During the next few years Harvey commanded several ships, including the frigates HMS Southampton and HMS Amphitrite in the West Indies and as part of the Cádiz blockade. Benefiting from the Navy reforms surrounding the Peace of Amiens, Harvey took command of HMS Agamemnon in which he participated in Sir Robert Calder's action at the Battle of Cape Finisterre in 1805, part of the prelude to the Battle of Trafalgar which Harvey narrowly missed. At Finisterre Harvey's ship suffered only three wounded and he left the ships to take over HMS Canada. Thus it was Sir Edward Berry who led Agamemnon at Trafalgar a few months later.

During the next eight years, Harvey fulfilled the blockade duties of any captain of a ship of the line, not achieving any major victories but steadily doing his duty with quiet success. From Canada, Harvey moved first to HMS Leviathan and then HMS Royal Sovereign, a first rate on which he was promoted to rear admiral in December 1813. Flag rank limited Harvey's employment prospects and it was not until the war was over that he was actively employed again, becoming commander-in-chief of the Leeward Islands Station between 1816 and 1818.

In 1819, Harvey retired and settled in Deal, Kent with his wife and daughter, Elizabeth Harvey, to lead a quiet life of the gentry. Promotions and honours steadily increased over the years, Harvey adding to the Companion of the Order of the Bath he had received in 1815 with elevation to Knight Commander in 1833 and promotion to vice-admiral in 1825 and full admiral just weeks before his death in January 1837. Harvey died on 17 February 1837 at his home in Deal.

== Natural history collection ==
During his lifetime Harvey amassed a large collection of natural history specimens that were subsequently obtained by the Oxford University Museum of Natural History.

== Notes ==
Military offices
Preceded by Sir Philip Durham	Commander-in-Chief, Leeward Islands Station; 1816–1818	Succeeded by Donald Campbell
