= Edward Harvey =

Royal Navy Admiral (1783–1865)

Admiral Sir Edward Harvey GCB
- Born: 1783; Eastry, Kent
- Died: 4 May 1865 (aged 82-81); Walmer, Kent
- Military career
- Allegiance: United Kingdom
- Branch: Royal Navy
- Service years: 1794 to 1860
- Rank: Royal Navy Admiral
- Commands: Nore Command
- Conflicts: French Revolutionary Wars; Glorious First of June; Battle of Camperdown; Napoleonic Wars; Bombardment of Acre
- Awards: Knight Grand Cross of the Order of the Bath

Admiral Sir Edward Harvey, GCB (1783 – 4 May 1865) was an officer of the Royal Navy during the French Revolutionary and Napoleonic Wars and continued in the service during the first half of the nineteenth century during which he participated in the bombardment of Acre in 1840. Harvey was the son of John Harvey an officer killed in action at the Glorious First of June and was related to several senior officers of the period in the distinguished Harvey family. A great-grandson, Francis Harvey won the Victoria Cross in 1916, sacrificing himself to save over 1,000 lives.

== Early career ==
Edward Harvey was born at the family home in Eastry, Kent to Captain John Harvey and his wife Judith. the second brother of a large family, Harvey was educated at home before joining his father on his ship HMS Brunswick as a "gentleman volunteer" aged only ten at the outbreak of the French Revolutionary Wars in 1793. Gaining experience of the service under his father and accompanied by his cousin Thomas Harvey, young Edward was present during the Glorious First of June, when a British Fleet under Admiral Lord Howe engaged a French force several hundred miles out in the North Atlantic. The battle was fought to contest the passage of a grain convoy from the United States to France and although the French lost the battle, they did give the convoy time to reach the French Atlantic ports.

Brunswick suffered greatly in the battle, however, becoming entangled with the French ship Vengeur du Peuple and both ships taking terrible damage, the Vengeur sinking soon afterwards and Brunswick only just reaching home with hundreds of dead and wounded. Amongst the latter was Harvey's father, who died in Portsmouth of severe wounds on 30 July. Edward and his elder brother John both benefited from the celebrity attached to the family after their father's heroic death and Edward was sent to join John and Thomas aboard HMS Prince of Wales, the flagship commanded by their uncle Admiral Henry Harvey.

== Napoleonic Wars ==
When the company of Prince of Wales was broken up in 1797, Edward was dispatched to the frigate HMS Beaulieu which was engaged at the Battle of Camperdown soon afterwards. In the battle British ships of all sizes were engaged in stopping a Dutch fleet intended to aid the invasion of Ireland and the battle was fought close inshore so that many of the Dutch ships were wrecked in the aftermath of the action. Beaulieu came through the action largely unscathed however and in the next few years Harvey, as a midshipman, followed his elder brother John into the frigates HMS Southampton and HMS Amphitrite.

In 1801 Harvey was made lieutenant and over the next seven years was constantly engaged in the North Sea and the Mediterranean in a variety of ships. In 1808 he was promoted to commander and took on his first independent command, the sloop HMS Cephalus. In 1811 Harvey was again promoted to post captain and took command of the frigate HMS Topaze on his first commission. The ship paid off in 1812 and Harvey spent the next eighteen years pursuing interests ashore. During this time he married a Miss Cannon from Deal, Kent, with whom he had six children. The eldest was named Henry for his uncle and later became a captain in the Royal Navy.

== Return to the sea ==
In 1830 after a lengthy retirement, Harvey took to the sea again in command of the frigate HMS Undaunted off South Africa and the East Indies. In 1838 he commanded the ship of the line HMS Malabar in the West Indies and he subsequently commanded HMS Implacable in the Mediterranean. During his time in the latter ship, Harvey was engaged in the bombardment of the Turkish city of Acre during operations against the forces of Ibrahim Pasha of Egypt. In 1847 after another five year retirement, Harvey became a rear-admiral and the following year was appointed superintendent of Malta Dockyard, a posting he held for five years with his flag in HMS Ceylon.

During his next retirement in 1853, Harvey continued to climb ranks, being made a vice-admiral in 1854 before being recalled in 1857 as Commander-in-Chief, The Nore until 1860. In reward for these services, Harvey was advanced to full admiral in 1860 and knighted in 1861, being raised to a Knight Grand Cross of the Order of the Bath before his death at the family estate in Walmer, Kent in 1865.

== See also ==
- O'Byrne, William Richard (1849). "Harvey, Edward (a)" . A Naval Biographical Dictionary . John Murray – via Wikisource.

== Notes ==
Military offices
Preceded by Lucius Curtis	Admiral Superintendent, Malta Dockyard; 1848–1853	Succeeded by Houston Stewart
Preceded by William Gordon	Commander-in-Chief, The Nore; 1857–1860	Succeeded by Sir William Hope-Johnstone
