= Thomas Harvey (Royal Navy officer) =

Vice-Admiral Sir Thomas Harvey KCB
- Born: 1775
- Died: 28 May 1841 (aged 65–66); Admiralty House, Bermuda
- Military career
- Allegiance: United Kingdom
- Branch: Royal Navy
- Service years: 1787 to 1841
- Rank: Royal Navy Vice-Admiral
- Conflicts: French Revolutionary Wars; Glorious First of June; Battle of Groix; Capture of Trinidad; Napoleonic Wars; Dardanelles operation
- Awards: Knight Commander of the Order of the Bath

Vice-Admiral Sir Thomas Harvey, KCB (1775 – 28 May 1841) was a senior Royal Navy officer who saw service in the French Revolutionary and Napoleonic Wars and died as commander-in-chief on the West Indies Station. The son of a senior Royal Navy officer and from a family with a long military tradition, Harvey distinguished himself under his father at the Glorious First of June and as a post-captain in his own right at Admiral John Thomas Duckworth's attempt to force the Dardanelles in 1807 and commanded numerous ships and stations in the post-war period.

== Early career ==
Thomas Harvey was born in 1775, the fourth son of Admiral Sir Henry Harvey and Elizabeth (née Boys). Shortly after his birth, his father, then a captain, left for service on the North America and West Indian stations during the American Revolutionary War. Raised in Kent with his mother and elder brothers, Harvey was sent to join the Navy aged only 12, serving for the next seven years aboard HMS Ramillies. In 1793 Ramillies became his father's ship and under Captain Harvey, young Thomas participated in the battle of the Glorious First of June when his ship rescued the embattled HMS Brunswick commanded by his uncle John Harvey. John Harvey died later of his wounds, but Thomas benefited from the general promotion which followed the action and became a lieutenant.

Harvey moved from Ramillies to HMS Prince of Wales when his father raised his flag in her and both were aboard during the Battle of Groix where Prince of Wales was extensively engaged and three French ships of the line were taken. Remaining with his father during 1795 and the first half of 1796, Harvey benefited from family contacts to receive promotion to commander in July 1796 and take command of the brig HMS Lacedemonian and then HMS Pelican, his first independent commands aged just 21. In Pelican Harvey was present when his father captured Trinidad in 1797 and as a result was awarded with promotion to post-captain at the extremely young age of 22.

== Napoleonic Wars ==
Following promotion, Harvey was given command of the frigates HMS Lapwing and HMS Unité for brief spells and in 1800 was recalled to England to serve with the force being prepared in the Thames under Horatio Nelson, who had been a shipmate of his father in the 1780s. Following the dispersal and then regrowth of the Navy surrounding the Peace of Amiens in 1801, Harvey was favoured with command of ship of the line HMS Standard, which was attached to Cuthbert Collingwood's Mediterranean fleet. It was whilst serving with this force in 1807 that Harvey was present at the attempt by Admiral John Thomas Duckworth to force the Dardanelles and drive the Turkish Empire out of the war.

The operation was a failure, after Turkish shore batteries opened a murderous fire on the British squadron attempting to force passage on the 19 February 1807. Harvey had been instrumental in burning a Turkish squadron moored at the entrance to the Dardanelles, but during the return from Constantinople a round shot more than two feet in diameter crashed through Standard's lower deck, detonating a ready magazine of gun charges and killing several men before the resulting fire could be brought under control. Across the squadron as a whole, over a hundred men were killed and the operation made no effect on the diplomatic situation. In 1808 Harvey returned to England and commanded the ships of the line HMS Majestic in the Baltic Sea and HMS Sceptre in the North Sea. He did not participate in any significant actions during the remainder of the war and at the reformation of the Order of the Bath in 1815, Harvey was made a Companion.

== Senior command ==
Post-war, Harvey spent long periods on half-pay ashore with his wife Sarah (daughter of his uncle John Harvey) and eight children. Two of his three sons, Thomas Harvey and Henry Harvey later became admirals themselves and led distinguished careers, whilst his third son William Harvey joined the church. From 1819 to 1821 Harvey was given the plum role of commander of the Sheerness guardship HMS Northumberland until in 1821 he was promoted to rear-admiral, necessitating a temporary retirement from service until a suitable position opened up.

It was not until 17 years later, in 1839, that Harvey's seniority (now a Vice-Admiral and Knight Commander of the Order of the Bath), allowed him to become Commander-in-Chief of the North America and West Indies Station. This was a position which both his father and his cousin John Harvey had previously held. The command was exercised from Bermuda, and it was there, at Admiralty House that he died, still serving, in May 1841. He was buried on the island.

== Legacy ==
In 2011, the National Museum of Bermuda acquired an 1834 portrait of Thomas Harvey with the assistance of the antiquarian Janette Rosing. A monument to Harvey includes a brass plaque that was added in 1957.

Harvey's journal for 1805 to 1807, as well as his letters are in the collection of the Royal Museums Greenwich.

== Notes ==
Military offices
Preceded by Sir Charles Paget	Commander-in-Chief, North America and West Indies Station; 1839–1841	Succeeded by Sir Charles Adam
