= Edward Harvey (disambiguation) =

Sir Edward Harvey (1783–1865) was a British Royal Navy admiral.

Edward Harvey may also refer to:

- Edward Harvey (politician) (1658–1736), MP for Clitheroe
- Edward Harvey (British Army officer) (1718–1778), British Army general

== See also ==
- Ted Harvey, American politician
