= Donald Campbell (Royal Navy officer) =

British naval officer

Rear-Admiral Donald Campbell
- Born: 1788
- Died: 1856 (aged 67–68)
- Military career
- Allegiance: United Kingdom
- Branch: Royal Navy
- Service years: 1791–1832
- Rank: Rear-Admiral
- Commands: HMS Tobago; HMS Lily; HMS Pert; HMS Espiegle; HMS Port d'Espagne; HMS Rosamond; Leeward Islands Station
- Conflicts: French Revolutionary Wars; Napoleonic Wars

Rear-Admiral Donald Campbell (1788–1856) was a Royal Navy officer who commanded the Leeward Islands Station.

== Naval career ==
Born the eldest son of Colin Campbell of Auchendoun, Argyll, Campbell joined the Royal Navy on 4 June 1791. He became commander of the schooner HMS Tobago in February 1805, the packet boat HMS Lily in September 1805 and the sloop HMS Pert in May 1807. He went on to be command the sloop HMS Espiegle in September 1809, the sloop HMS Port d'Espagne in April 1810 and the fifth-rate HMS Rosamond in September 1810. He became commander-in-chief of the Leeward Islands Station in 1818 and Inspecting-Commander in the Coast Guard in 1822 before retiring in 1832.

== Sources ==
- O'Byrne, William Richard (1849). "Campbell, Donald" . A Naval Biographical Dictionary . John Murray – via Wikisource.

Military offices
Preceded by John Harvey	Commander-in-Chief, Leeward Islands Station; 1818–1819	Succeeded by Thomas Huskisson
