= Philip Charles Durham =

Royal Navy Admiral (1763–1845)

Admiral Sir Philip Durham GCB
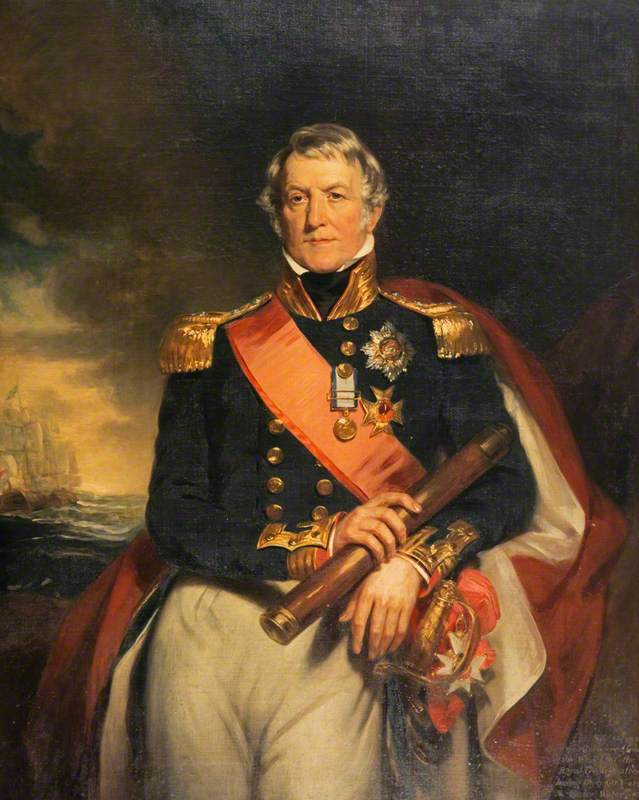
- Durham in 1843, by John Wood
- Born: 29 July 1763; Largo, Fife, Scotland
- Died: 2 April 1845 (aged 81); Naples, Italy
- Burial place: Largo church, Largo, Fife, Scotland
- Military career
- Allegiance: United Kingdom
- Branch: Royal Navy
- Rank: Admiral
- Commands: Leewards Islands Station; Portsmouth Command
- Conflicts: American War of Independence; French Revolutionary War; Napoleonic Wars
- Awards: Knight Grand Cross of the Order of the Bath

Admiral Sir Philip Charles Henderson Calderwood Durham, GCB (baptised 29 July 1763 – 2 April 1845) was a Royal Navy officer whose service in the American War of Independence, French Revolutionary War and Napoleonic Wars was lengthy, distinguished and at times controversial.

== Biography ==
Philip Charles Durham was born in Largo, Fife in 1763, the fourth child and third son of James Durham. His maternal grandmother was the diarist Margaret Calderwood. He came from a wealthy landed family, and entered the navy aged fourteen in 1777 aboard the ship of the line HMS Trident. His first year at sea was somewhat blighted when that ship came under the command of a martinet captain, Anthony James Pye Molloy, under whom the ship's company grew mutinous. In 1778 Durham procured his discharge and afterwards obtained a position under his original captain, on HMS Edgar. Aboard her he saw his first action during the Great Siege of Gibraltar, later gaining the attention of Admiral Richard Kempenfelt, with whom he served on HMS Victory and HMS Royal George. Durham was watch officer on 29 August 1782 when, through no fault of his own, the Royal George, which was heeled for repairs, suddenly and catastrophically sank at Spithead. Being on deck, Durham was able to jump overboard and swim to safety, but the Admiral and over 800 persons lost their lives.

Durham then filled a lieutenant's vacancy on HMS Union in which he saw further service at the siege of Gibraltar before making a cruise to the West Indies and then another one down the African coast in HMS Raisonnable as a junior lieutenant. Durham spent the next two years living in France, becoming fluent in French. Afterwards he served in HMS Salisbury and HMS Barfleur.

The emergency in 1790 brought him promotion to Commander on 2 November 1790 and command of HMS Daphne. From there he moved in 1791 to HMS Cygnet.

On 12 February 1793 Durham took command of the small sloop HMS Spitfire. Spitfire was pierced for 14 guns but only carried ten.

The next day he captured the French privateer Afrique. The capture of Afrique was the first capture of the war of a vessel flying La tricolore. For this feat Lloyd's of London gave him a piece of plate worth 100 guineas, or £300, their first such award of the war.

Durham received promotion to post captain on 24 June 1793 and command of the frigate HMS Narcissus. From her, on 22 October, he moved to HMS Hind.

In Hind he brought in a convoy of 157 merchant ships from the Mediterranean in the face of enemy opposition. This feat provoked accolades and rewards, and he took over the frigate HMS Anson in 1796. Anson was the biggest frigate in the Navy, cut down (razeed) from a ship of the line to oppose large French frigates, and in her fought numerous actions, especially at the Battle of Donegal in October 1798.

Signature of Captain Durham on a document after Trafalgar

On 28 March 1799 he married Lady Charlotte Matilda Bruce, daughter of royal governess Lady Elgin and sister of the Lord Elgin of Elgin Marbles fame, and continued his service in home waters until the Peace of Amiens. Following the resumption of hostilities, Durham was given HMS Defiance, which he took to join Admiral Sir Robert Calder's fleet in 1804 and participated in the battle of Cape Finisterre after which he was informally reprimanded by Calder for being "over zealous" in pursuit of the enemy. Following the battle Admiral Calder requested a court martial to acquit his own conduct and called Captain Durham to appear in his defence along with two other captains. Unlike his two comrades, Durham flatly refused to leave his ship which had been repaired at

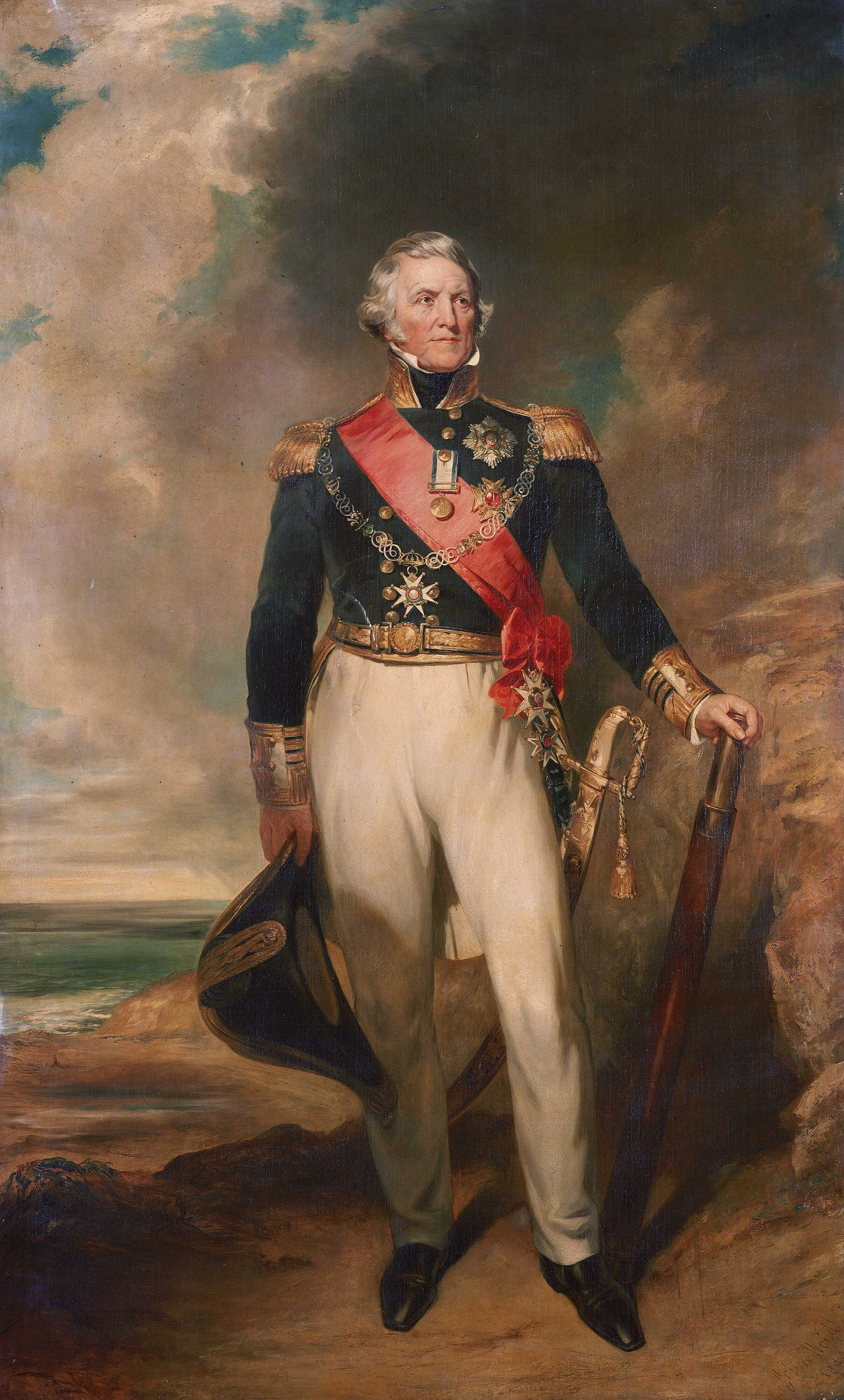
Admiral Sir Philip H Calderwood Durham (1763-1845), by John Wood 1844, National Maritime Museum, Greenwich, London

Portsmouth and specially requested by Lord Nelson and so was still in command at the Battle of Trafalgar a few months later. The other two captains, William Brown and William Lechmere commanding HMS Ajax and HMS Thunderer missed the battle whilst in England.

At the Battle of Trafalgar, Defiance headed straight for the Spanish flagship Principe de Asturias but was blocked by the Berwick, a captured British ship in French service. Deliberately ramming her opponent, Defiance tore off most of the French ship's bow and devastatingly raked her before fighting a long gun duel with the battered Aigle as the Berwick wallowed in her wake (she sank after the battle). The Defiance was unable to gain the upper hand against the Aigle, and so a young master's mate named Jack Spratt swam between the ships and leaped on board, fighting alone against the entire French crew until support could be given from his ship. The British crew then swarmed across the Frenchman and captured her. Durham was wounded in the battle. He took his battered ship (which had suffered 17 men killed 53 wounded)back to England, in time to give evidence at Calder's court-martial, became a banner bearer at Nelson's funeral.

Following his recovery and receipt of the usual awards for a Trafalgar captain, Durham was transferred to HMS Renown which he commanded in the English Channel and the Mediterranean until 1810 when he was made a Rear-Admiral. In 1814 he was given command of the Leeward Islands Station and captured two enemy frigates on his way there in HMS Venerable. He remained at this post until the end of the war in 1815 when the French West Indies surrendered to him. He was Knighted and created Knight Commander (KCB). Following his first wife's death in 1816 he married, in 1817, wealthy heiress Anne Isabella Henderson but this marriage was also childless. In 1819, was promoted to vice admiral He was on friendly terms with King George III, who was especially fond of Durham's tall tales, often remarking "That's a Durham!" when he heard such a tale regardless of the raconteur.

In 1830 Durham became a full admiral and conferment as a Knight Grand Cross of the Order of the Bath on 1 December. He was elected a Member of Parliament for Queenborough in 1830, though this was overturned on petition and he did not take his seat. He was elected for Devizes in 1834. He became the naval Commander-in-Chief, Portsmouth (1836–1839) and was the second president (first naval president) of the Army and Navy Club in London.

He added the names Henderson and Calderwood to his own on his second marriage and on inheriting his mother's family estate, respectively. Following his second wife's death in 1844, Durham journeyed to Rome on private business. Contracting bronchitis, he went to Naples intent on taking a ship back to Britain, but died there on 2 April 1845, his remains being returned to Largo for burial in the family vault. As his biographer Hilary L. Rubinstein (who has also edited his naval papers, available to subscribers to the Navy Records Society) discovered, he had an illegitimate daughter, Ann Bower (1789/90 - 1858), but left no further descendants.

== Memorial at Largo church, East Fife ==
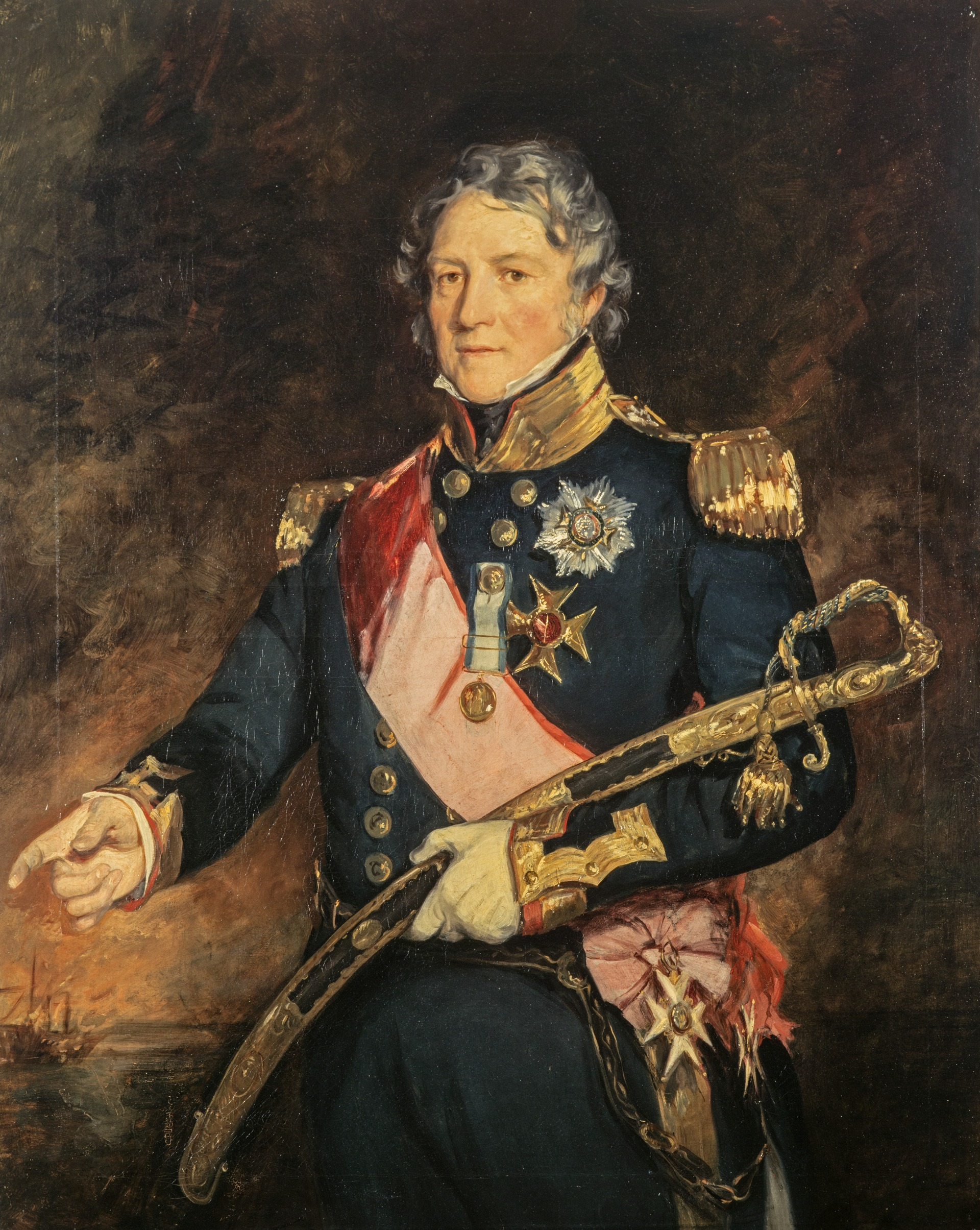
Admiral Sir Philip Charles Henderson Calderwood Durham, by Sir Francis Grant about 1830. National Galleries Scotland.

"In memory of Sir Philip Charles Henderson Calderwood Durham of Fordell, Polton and Largo, Admiral of the Red, Knight Grand Cross of Bath and of military merit in France. He was born (sic; in fact baptised) on 29 July 1763 entered the R.N at 14 and was made Post Captain in 1793, his activity, gallantry, judgement and zeal were excelled by none in his profession and his numerous captures and successes were acknowledged by many public testimonials. He became Rear Admiral in 1810 with Commander in Chief for he West Indies from 1813 till peace in 1815 and held the command at Portsmouth from 1837-1839, he represented Queensborough and Devizes in several Parliaments, but passed his later years chiefly at Fordel. Courted in society and generously spending an ample fortune, in 1799 he married Lady Charlotte Matilda Bruce, daughter of Charles, 5th Earl of Elgin who died in 1816 and secondly in 1817 Anne Elizabeth (sic; in fact Anne Isabella), daughter and heiress of Sir John Henderson of Fordell, Baronet, whom he survived only 3 months, he died at Naples on the 2.4.1845 and was interred beneath the West Aisle of this Church. Erected by his Great Nephew James Wolfe Murray of Cringletie 1849."

== Footnotes ==
Parliament of the United Kingdom
Preceded by Wadham Locke; Montague Gore	Member of Parliament for Devizes; 1834–1836; With: Wadham Locke 1834–1835; Thomas Estcourt 1835–1836	Succeeded by Thomas Estcourt; James Whitley Deans Dundas
Military offices
Preceded by Sir Francis Laforey	Commander-in-Chief, Leeward Islands Station; 1814–1816	Succeeded by John Harvey
Preceded by Sir Thomas Williams	Commander-in-Chief, Portsmouth; 1836–1839	Succeeded by Charles Elphinstone Fleeming
