= Janette Rosing =

British antiquarian and collector (1942–2021)

Janette Rosing (1942 - 2021) was an antiquarian, art and photograph collector. Her photograph collection, included some 8,000 images including early photographs of the Industrial Revolution described as some of the oldest photographs in England. The collection primarily included 19th and 20th century photography. Some of the collection was exhibited in 2015 at the London Photograph Fair.

== Life ==
She began collecting photographs in the early 1980s. She amassed her collection through fairs and auctions. She was close friends with Charles Cloney, a reclusive photographic collector who also amassed a large collection and died in 2002.

In 2011, she assisted the National Museum of Bermuda with acquiring an 1834 portrait of the Royal Navy officer Thomas Harvey.

She died 6 March 2021.

In February 2025, Historic England acquired the Janette Rosing Collection, describing it as of "great national significance".
