= HMS Nightingale =

Eleven vessels of the Royal Navy and its predecessors have been named Nightingale after the common nightingale:

- English ship Nightingale (1626) was a vessel captured in 1626 and listed in the navy until 1628.
- English ship Nightingale (1651) was a 22-gun (later 30-gun) Fifth rate ship launched in 1651 for the navy of the Commonwealth of England, taken into the new Royal Navy in 1660 and wrecked on the Goodwin Sands in 1672.
- HMS Nightingale (1702) was a 24-gun Nightingale group frigate launched in 1702 and captured by the French in 1707. She served in the French Navy as Rossignol before being recaptured by HMS Ludlow Castle later in the year. She was renamed Fox and rebuilt to a longer design in 1727 before being broken up in 1737.
- HMS Nightingale (1707) was a 24-gun Aldborough group frigate launched in 1707 and sold in 1716.
- HMS Nightingale (1746) was a 24-gun frigate purchased by the Royal Navy while being privately built in 1746. She was sunk as a breakwater at Harwich in 1773.
- HMS Nightingale (1805) was a 16-gun Seagull-class brig sloop launched in 1805 and sold in 1815.
- HMS Nightingale (1825) was a 6-gun cutter launched in 1825 and wrecked in 1829.
- HMS Nightingale (1829) was an 8-gun packet boat purchased in 1829 having previously sailed as Marchioness of Salisbury. She was sold in 1842.
- HMS Nightingale (1855) was an Albacore-class gunboat launched in 1855 and sold in 1867.
- HMS Nightingale (1897) was a river gunboat launched in 1897 and sold in 1919.
- HMS Nightingale (1931) was a mining tender launched in 1931 and sold in 1957.
