= Leeward Islands Station =

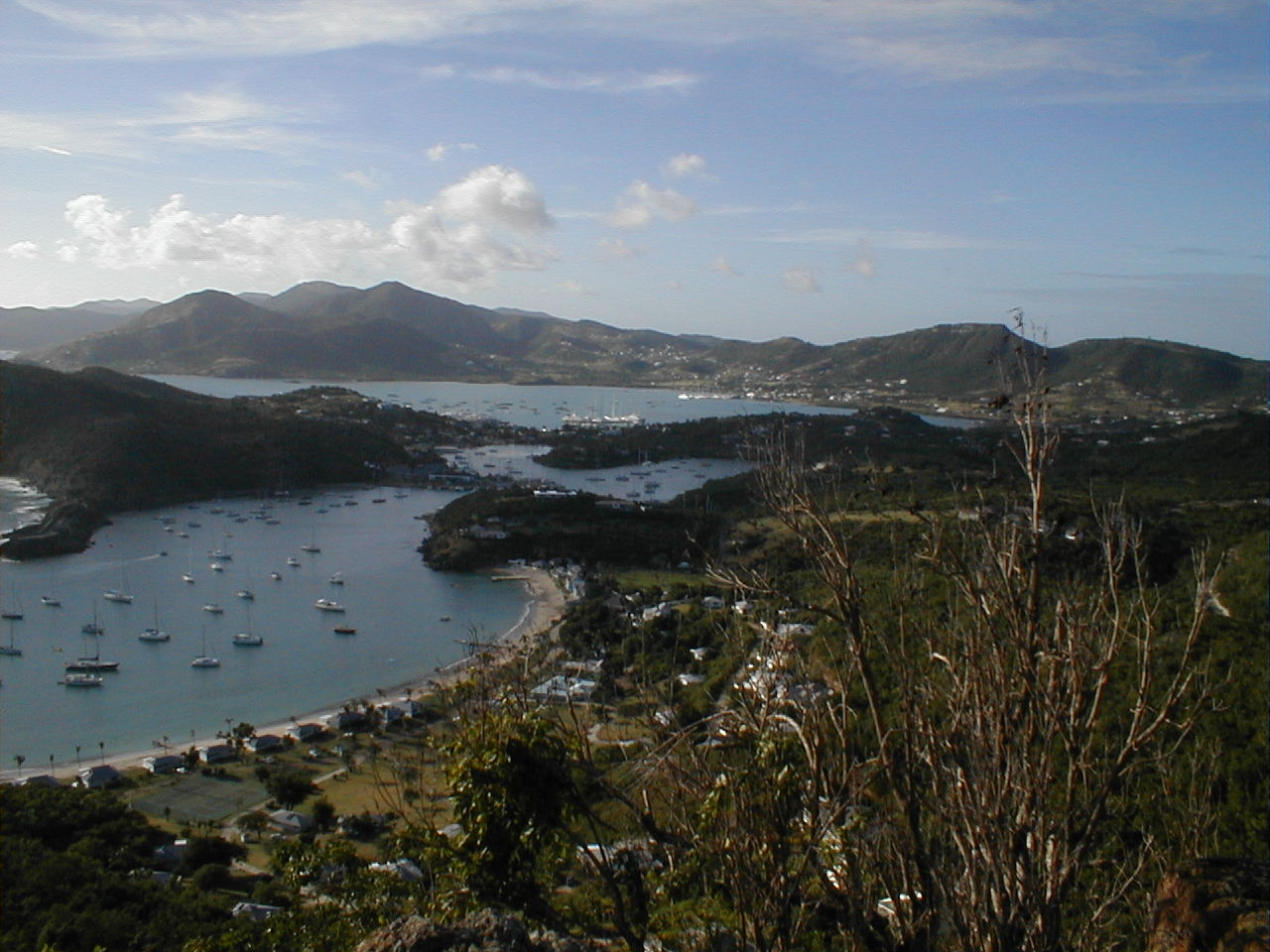
- English Harbour and Falmouth Harbour, Antigua
- Active: 1743–1821
- Country: United Kingdom
- Branch: Royal Navy
- Type: Formation
- Part of: Royal Navy
- Garrison/HQ: Nelson's Dockyard

The Leeward Islands Station originally known as the Commander-in-Chief at Barbadoes and the Leeward Islands was a formation or command of the Kingdom of Great Britain and then the United Kingdom's Royal Navy stationed at English Harbour, Antigua, Leeward Islands. It existed from 1743 to 1821.

== History ==
During the 18th and 19th centuries, Antigua served as the headquarters of first the Commander in Chief Barbadoes and Leeward Islands then later the Commander in Chief, Leeward Islands which was the British navy's important base in the Eastern Caribbean area during the Napoleonic Wars. The three most strategically important bases were Antigua, Barbados and St. Lucia. The Station was formed in October 1743 as a command separate from the older Jamaica Station to protect Britain's sugar producing islands and its convoys. During the Seven Years' War, a number of large-scale naval actions were conducted by the Royal Navy from this Caribbean base, one of its major engagements was the Battle of the Saintes.

Antelope was sent to the Leeward Islands station for a 3 year tour of duty in 1816.

The station was in existence from 1743 to 1821 when it was abolished. The last commander-in-chief was reappointed as the Commander-in-Chief for the North America station.

== Commander-in-Chief, Barbadoes and Leeward Islands ==
Included:
No = died in post

- Commodore Charles Knowles (1743–1744) (also Second-in-Command, Jamaica Station)
- Rear-Admiral Peter Warren (1744–1745)
- Commodore Fitzroy Henry Lee (1745–1746)
- Vice-Admiral Isaac Townsend (1744–1746)
- Commodore Edward Legge (1746–1747) No
- Captain George Pocock (1747–1748)
- Rear-Admiral Henry Osborn (1748)
- Commodore Francis Holburne (1748–1752)
- Rear-Admiral Thomas Pye (1752–1755)
- Commodore Sir Thomas Frankland (1754)
- Commodore Charles Steevens (1755)
- Commodore Sir Thomas Frankland (1756–1757)
- Commodore John Moore (1757–1760)
- Commodore Sir James Douglas (1760–1761)
- Admiral Sir George Brydges Rodney (1761–1763)
- Rear-Admiral Sir William Burnaby (1763)
- Rear-Admiral Richard Tyrell (1763)
- Rear-Admiral Robert Swanton (1763–1764)
- Rear-Admiral Richard Tyrell (1765–1766) No
- Vice-Admiral Thomas Pye (1766–1769)
- Rear-Admiral Robert Man (1769–1772)

== Commander-in-Chief, Leeward Islands ==
No = died in post

- Vice-Admiral William Parry (1772–1775)
- Vice-Admiral James Young (1775–1778)
- Rear-Admiral Samuel Barrington (1778–1779)
- Vice-Admiral John Byron (1779)
- Rear-Admiral Sir Hyde Parker (1779–1780)
- Admiral Sir George Brydges Rodney (1780–1781)
- Rear-Admiral Sir Samuel Hood (1781–1782)
- Admiral Sir George Brydges Rodney (1782)
- Admiral Hugh Pigot (1782–1783)
- Rear Admiral Sir Richard Hughes (1783–1786)
- Commodore Sir Richard Bickerton (1786–1787)
- Commodore Sir William Parker (1787–1789)
- Rear-Admiral Sir John Laforey (1789–1793)
- Rear-Admiral Alan Gardner (1793)
- Vice-Admiral Sir John Jervis (1793–1794)
- Vice-Admiral Benjamin Caldwell (1794–1795)
- Admiral Sir John Laforey (1795–96)
- Rear-Admiral Sir Hugh Cloberry Christian (1796)
- Rear-Admiral Henry Harvey (1796–1799)
- Vice-Admiral Lord Hugh Seymour (1799–1800)
- Rear-Admiral Sir John Duckworth (1800–1801)
- Rear-Admiral Thomas Totty (1801–1802) No
- Commodore Samuel Hood (1802)
- Commodore Robert Stopford (1802–1805)
- Rear-Admiral Sir Alexander Cochrane (1805–1811)
- Rear-Admiral Sir Francis Laforey (1811–1814)
- Rear-Admiral Sir Philip Charles Durham (1814–1816)
- Rear-Admiral John Harvey (1816–1818)
- Rear-Admiral Donald Campbell (1818–1819)
- Commodore Thomas Huskisson (1819–1820)
- Rear-Admiral William Charles Fahie (1820–1821)
