= Henry Harvey =

Royal Navy officer (1737–1810)

Admiral Sir Henry Harvey KB
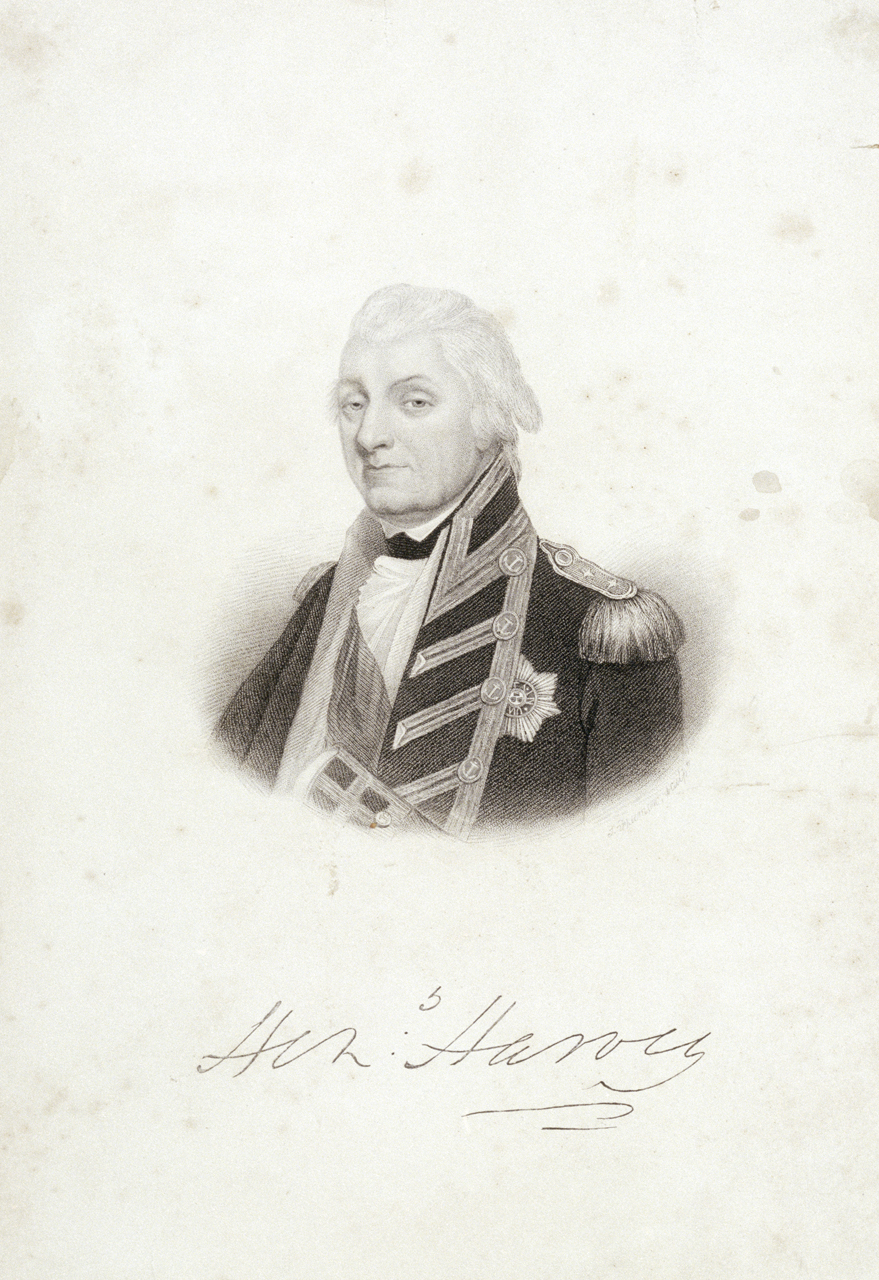
- Portrait by Samuel Freeman, c. 1810–1811
- Born: 1737; Eythorne, Kent
- Died: 28 December 1810 (aged 73); Walmer, Kent
- Military career
- Allegiance: Great Britain; United Kingdom
- Branch: Royal Navy
- Service years: 1751–1801
- Rank: Admiral
- Commands: HMS Magdalen; HMS Swift; HMS Martin; HMS Squirrel; HMS Convert; HMS Pegasus; HMS Rose; HMS Alfred; HMS Colossus; HMS Ramillies; HMS Prince of Wales; Leeward Islands Station
- Conflicts: Seven Years' War; American War of Independence; Battle of the Saintes; French Revolutionary Wars; Glorious First of June; Battle of Groix; Invasion of Trinidad (1797); Battle of San Juan (1797)
- Awards: Knight Companion of the Order of the Bath

Admiral Sir Henry Harvey KB (1737 – 28 December 1810) was a Royal Navy officer of the second half of the eighteenth century. Harvey participated in numerous naval operations and actions and especially distinguished himself at the Glorious First of June in command of HMS Ramillies. His career took him all over the world, particularly on the North American station and in the West Indies where he commanded numerous ships and, later in his career, squadrons during the course of three different wars. Harvey was a member of a distinguished naval family, his brother was killed in action in 1794, three of his sons entered the navy and one of them was later raised to admiral himself.

== Early career ==
Henry Harvey was born in Eythorne, Kent in 1737, the second son of Richard and Elizabeth Harvey. With his elder brother John Harvey, Henry was educated in France during the 1740s and in 1751 joined the Royal Navy, a service his brother also joined three years later. Harvey was encouraged into service by the distantly related Sir Peircy Brett, whose patronage supported Harvey throughout his career. Harvey's first ship, aged only eight, was the sixth-rate HMS Centaur aged eleven in 1754, Harvey was transferred to HMS Nightingale. It is not clear how much time Harvey actually spent aboard these ships, as it was common practice at the time for the children of naval families to be entered on a ship's books to gain experience pending their actual entry into the service, an illegal practice known as "false muster".

By 1757, and aged 15, Harvey was certainly at sea, making junior lieutenant aboard the fourth-rate HMS Hampshire in the English Channel, the West Indies and along the North American coast during the Seven Years' War. A capable and well supported officer, Harvey was soon promoted to first lieutenant aboard the frigate HMS Hussar, which was wrecked at Cape François, Cuba in 1762, resulting in Harvey spending the next year as a prisoner of war. During the voyage home on parole aboard HMS Dragon, Harvey made close friends with Lieutenant Constantine Phipps, who later became a Lord of the Admiralty.

=== Polar exploration ===
The end of the war that same year gave Harvey the opportunity to return to the sea as first lieutenant of the frigate HMS Mermaid off North America. In 1764 he was given his first independent command with the schooner HMS Magdalen, employed in anti-smuggling operations at the mouth of the St. Lawrence River. His success in the role was such that in 1768 Harvey was given the revenue cutter HMS Swift on similar duties in the English Channel, a role he continued in until 1771 when he was placed in reserve on half-pay. In 1773 an opportunity for adventurous service arrived with the offer of a position on Phipps's ship HMS Racehorse in which Harvey's friend was planning to explore the North Pole. The expedition also included a young Horatio Nelson. Although the journey did not reach the Pole, it did explore the seas north of Svalbard and scientifically discover the polar bear amongst other achievements.

== American Revolutionary War ==
With a promotion resulting from the expedition enabling further advancement, Harvey commanded the sloop HMS Martin at the Siege of Quebec in the American Revolutionary War of 1776. His knowledge of the St. Lawrence River and Canadian coastline gave him an advantage in this work and as a result he was raised in 1777 to command the frigate HMS Squirrel on convoy duty. December 1778 saw a transfer to the 32-gun frigate HMS Convert and in the following year Harvey was engaged in the relief of besieged Jersey and later unsuccessful efforts to intercept the raiding squadron of John Paul Jones. During 1779, Convert was employed escorting a convoy to Quebec and in December was attached to Sir George Rodney's fleet in the West Indies. Through 1780 and 1781, Convert served as a fleet scout and was present during the Battle of the Saintes in 1782, although the ship was too small to serve in the battleline. Shortly after the battle, Harvey was detached from the fleet for convoy duties back to England.

After a period of unemployment, Harvey was given command of the frigate HMS Pegasus for service on the North America station in 1786, but was disappointed to discover that his first lieutenant was Prince William Henry and that Harvey was expected to turn over the captaincy to his subordinate as soon as the ship was at sea. Controlling his disappointment, Harvey conducted the affair with "such discretion as secured to him the lasting friendship of His Royal Highness". Within weeks, Harvey had been transferred to HMS Rose and, aboard her, joined Pegasus in peacetime manoeuvres off the North American station until the ship was paid-off in 1789. In 1788, Harvey eldest son, also named Henry, had drowned in a shipboard accident whilst serving as a midshipman in Rose. Following the ship's paying-off, Harvey returned to half-pay. He was not on the beach for long however, because of the Spanish armament during the Nootka Crisis of 1790. Along with many ships officers and crews he was brought back into service. As an experienced and well-connected officer, Harvey was given a ship of the line, first HMS Alfred, then HMS Colossus and by 1794, after the outbreak of the French Revolutionary Wars, he was given command of HMS Ramillies.

== French revolutionary wars ==
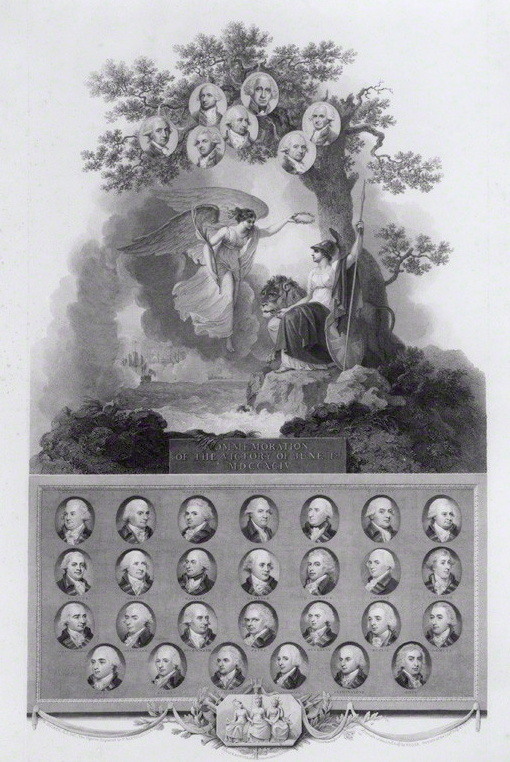
Plate commemorating the Glorious First of June with miniature portraits of all of the commanders

Ramillies was present with Admiral Lord Howe's fleet at the battle of the Glorious First of June in 1794 and in her Harvey distinguished himself by rescuing the stricken HMS Brunswick commanded by his brother John. Brunswick had become entangled with the French Vengeur du Peuple and both ships were in danger of sinking when Ramillies arrived, raking Vengeur twice and driving her off her opponent and into clear water, in which she first surrendered and later sank. John Harvey died of wounds received in the action a month later and days after his death his brother was promoted to flag rank as a rear-admiral. Harvey first commanded a squadron in the North Sea, but in June 1795 with his flag in HMS Prince of Wales, Harvey participated in the minor victory of the Battle of Groix, where three French ships were taken. Over the winter of 1795/96, Harvey remained in the area as floating support for Sir John Borlase Warren's invasion at Quiberon Bay. Following the expedition's failure early in 1796, Harvey helped evacuate the British and French Royalist force before it was destroyed by the Republican Army.

In April 1796, Harvey was made commander-in-chief of the Leeward Islands Station and in 1797 captured Trinidad from the Spanish, taking several warships as prizes and landing Sir Ralph Abercromy's army to take the whole island. A similar attempt on Puerto Rico later in the year failed in the face of well-prepared Spanish defences. By 1799 Harvey was contemplating retirement and passed the station to Lord Hugh Seymour, returning to England and raising his flag in HMS Royal Sovereign as second-in-command of the Channel Fleet until the Peace of Amiens in 1801. Harvey retired from the Navy a vice-admiral appointed Knight Companion of the Order of the Bath. He settled with his wife Elizabeth (née Boys) in Walmer, Kent and in 1804 was promoted as a full admiral in retirement. He died peacefully in 1810, survived by his wife and three of his five children, including his sons Richard and Thomas. Thomas Harvey later became an admiral in his own right.

== Notes ==
Military offices
Preceded by Sir Hugh Christian	Commander-in-Chief, Leeward Islands Station; 1796–1799	Succeeded by Lord Hugh Seymour
