= HMS Nightingale (1707) =

British warship

History

Great Britain
- Name: HMS Nightingale
- Builder: William Johnson, Blackwall
- Launched: 15 October 1706
- Acquired: 28 July 1706
- Commissioned: 1708
- Out of service: 12 June 1716
- Fate: Sold for breaking

General characteristics
- Class & type: 24-gun sixth-rate
- Tons burthen: 25355/94 bm
- Length: 90 ft 2 in (27.5 m) gundeck; 74 ft 0.5 in (22.6 m) keel for tonnage
- Beam: 25 ft 4.5 in (7.7 m)
- Depth of hold: 10 ft 6 in (3.2 m)
- Propulsion: Sail
- Sail plan: ship-rigged
- Complement: 115
- Armament: 20 × 6-pdrs on upper deck; 4 × 4-pdrs guns on quarterdeck

HMS Nightingale was a 24-gun sixth-rate ship of the Royal Navy, purchased in 1706 and in service in North America and English waters until 1716.

Nightingale was the fourth named ship since it was used for a vessel captured in 1626 and listed until 1628.

== Specifications and construction ==
Initially intended for merchant service, the vessel was purchased for naval use while still under construction at London's Blackwall Yard on 2 August 1706. She was launched on 9 September 1706. Her gundeck was 98 feet 2 inches (29.9 metres) with her keel 74 feet 0.5 inches (22.6 metres) reported for tonnage. Her breadth was 25 feet 4.5 inches (7.7 metres). Her depth of hold was 10 feet 6 inches (3.2 metres). Her builder's Measure tonnage was 25355/94 tons. She carried a standardize armament of twenty 6-pounders on the upper deck (UD) and four 4-pounders on the quarterdeck. She was a full rigged ship.

== Commissioned service ==
She was commissioned as Nightingale in 1707 under the command of Commander Covill Mayne, RN for service in the Downs. She went to Newfoundland in 1708. In March 1709 she was under the command of Captain Charles Gay, RN for the North Sea. She was assigned to the Scottish coast in 1711. In January 1713 under Captain Ezekiel Wright she sailed for Maryland. She remained there until she returned in 1715.

== Disposition ==
She was sold for £257 (Note: A total cost accounting for inflation of approximately £45,700 in today's money.) on 21 June 1716.
