= John Harvey (Royal Navy officer, born 1740) =

Royal Navy officer (1740–1794)

Captain John Harvey
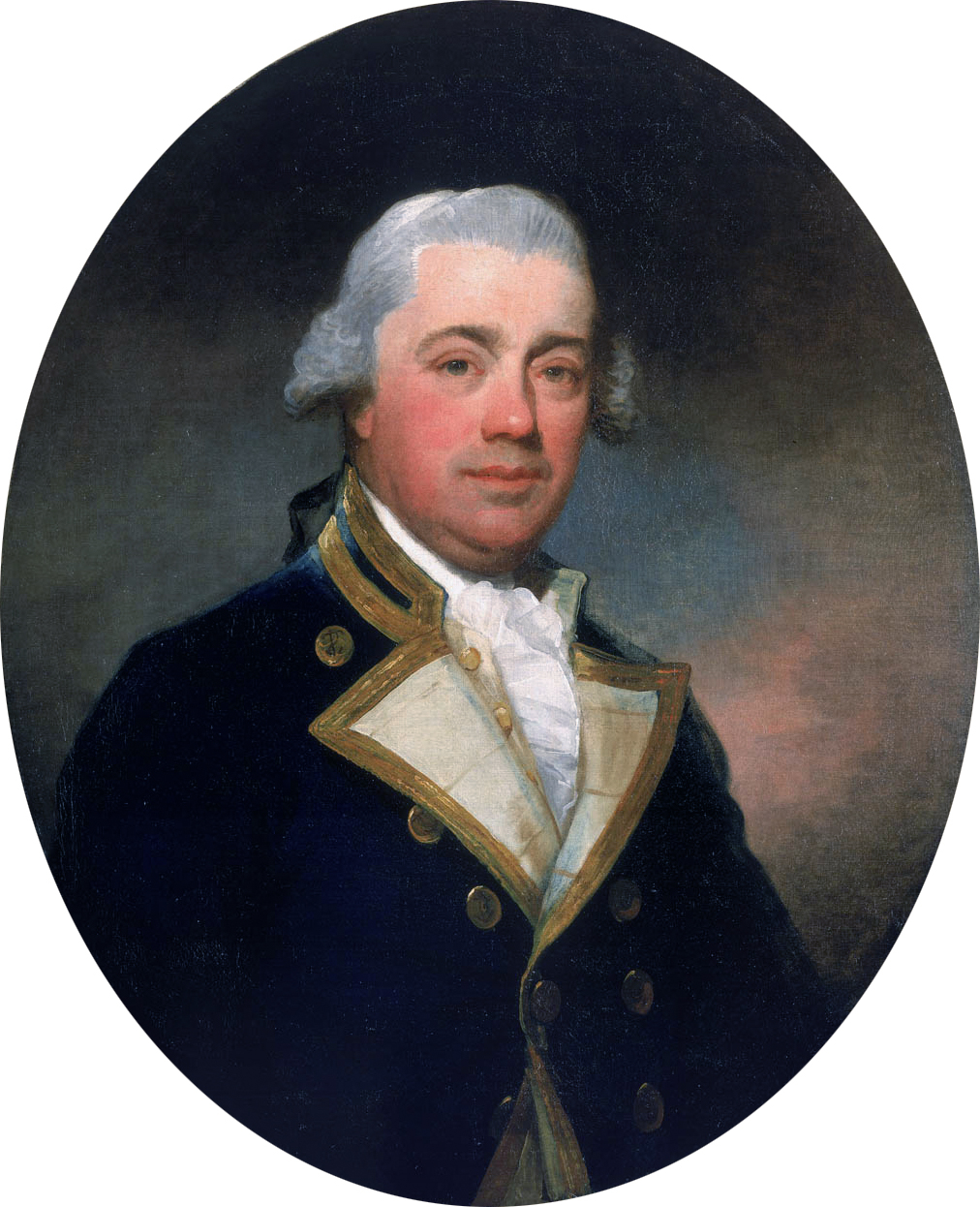
- Portrait by Gilbert Stuart
- Born: 9 July 1740; Eastry, Kent
- Died: 30 June 1794 (aged 53); Portsmouth, Hampshire
- Military career
- Allegiance: Great Britain
- Branch: Royal Navy
- Service years: 1754–1794
- Rank: Captain
- Conflicts: Seven Years' War; American War of Independence; Great Siege of Gibraltar; Battle of Cape Spartel; Fourth Anglo-Dutch War; Action of 4 February 1781; War of the First Coalition; Glorious First of June (DOW)

Captain John Harvey (9 July 1740 – 30 June 1794) was a Royal Navy officer whose death in the aftermath of the battle of the Glorious First of June where he had commanded HMS Brunswick terminated a long and highly successful career and made him a celebrity in Britain, a memorial to his memory being raised in Westminster Abbey.

== Early career ==
Born in 1740 at Eastry, Kent, John Harvey was the son of Richard and Elizabeth Harvey née Nichols, local gentry. Entering the Navy in 1754, Harvey began a long family naval tradition, taken up by his brother Henry Harvey a few years later. His first ship was HMS Falmouth, a fifty-gun fourth rate in which he stayed for five years into the Seven Years' War. In 1759, promoted to lieutenant with the patronage of Admiral Francis Holburne and distant relation Sir Peircy Brett, Harvey joined the sloop-of-war HMS Hornet and frigate HMS Arethusa, taking shore pay in 1762 at the war's conclusion. The same year he married Judith Wise of Sandwich, Kent and the couple had large family, their sons including several future admirals.

== American War of Independence ==
Between 1766 and 1768, Harvey commanded the sloop HMS Alarm off Scotland but following promotion in 1768 he was again forced to take half-pay on shore for the next eight years, until the American War of Independence caused a dramatic increase of the size of the Navy. Briefly commanding the sloop HMS Speedwell, Harvey was soon promoted once more, making post captain and being given the prime command of HMS Panther, the 60-gun flagship of Admiral Robert Duff at Gibraltar. From 1778 until 1780, Harvey distinguished himself at the Great Siege of Gibraltar, even commanding there during 1780 in the absence of his senior officer.

In 1780, Panther returned to England and was then attached for a year to Sir Samuel Hood's fleet in the West Indies, participating in the action of 4 February 1781. Returning to England early in 1782, Harvey was transferred to the new 64-gun ship HMS Sampson and in her returned to the Mediterranean, again distinguishing himself at the relief of Gibraltar and the subsequent Battle of Cape Spartel. At the war's conclusion the following year, Harvey retained his active career due to his excellent records and served in several shore appointments, including regulating captain at Deal and commander of the guardship HMS Arrogant at Sheerness.

== French Revolutionary Wars ==
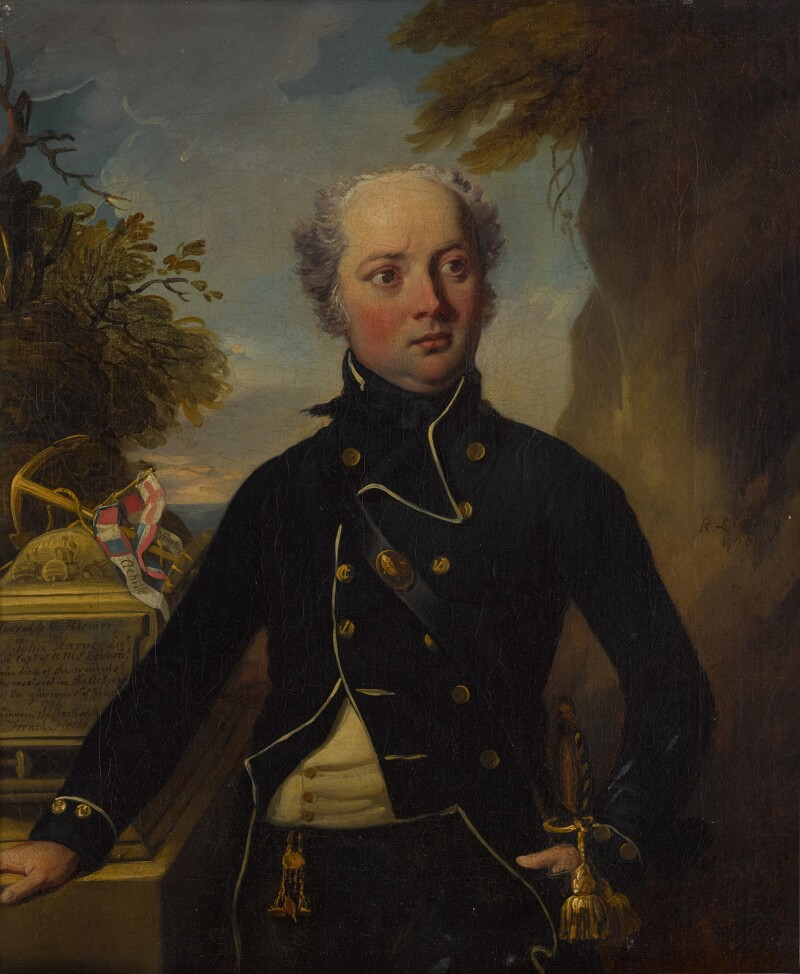
Portrait of Captain John Harvey of HMS Brunswick, by Richard Livesay

With the French Revolution of 1790 making war inevitable, the Navy again expanded and Harvey was subject to special request from Admiral Lord Howe who desired him to command the new and powerful 74-gun ship of the line HMS Brunswick in the Channel Fleet. The Channel Fleet was not forced to wait long before joining action, Britain going to war in 1793 and a year later becoming embroiled in the battle of the Glorious First of June, an engagement intended to cut off France's grain supply from the young United States. Howe had been chasing the French fleet protecting the convoy for some days, and several short and sharp actions had been fought without conclusion. On 1 June 1794 however, Howe finally gained the wind on the French and overhauled them in a long line of battle.

=== Glorious First of June ===
Brunswick fighting the Achille and Vengeur du Peuple during the Glorious First of June

Howe was not planning a regular naval battle of orderly lines and formal engagement but was instead relying on the inexperience of the French revolutionary crews to provide his captains with an opportunity for a large scale victory. Howe ordered his captains to turn towards the French fleet and for each ship in the British line to cut the French line, raking ships either side as they did so before engaging them in close combat and relying on superior British training and firepower to subdue the enemy. These tactics were only partially successful, primarily because the British captains had never been issued such an order before and many refused to enact it as too risky, most simply engaging the French from a distance or making a show of crossing the line before turning in for close engagement too early. Several captains however were aware of the spirit of the order and made efforts to break through the French line. Among these captains was John Harvey.

Brunswick' opponent was the 74-gun Vengeur du Peuple, a good ship with a disorganised but plentiful crew. Harvey held his nerve and cut the line, but was then undone when Brunswick's anchor became entangled in the French ships rigging. A vicious close range cannon and musket duel ensued, the two ships hidden by smoke as the battle continued elsewhere. Brunswick's master requested permission to cut the anchor free, but Harvey replied "No, as we've got her, we'll keep her." During the engagement which followed, both ships suffered terrible casualties, Brunswick taking 44 dead and 114 wounded. Harvey was himself hit three times, losing his right hand to a musket ball, being hit on the back by a large wooden splinter and finally having his elbow shattered by a French roundshot.

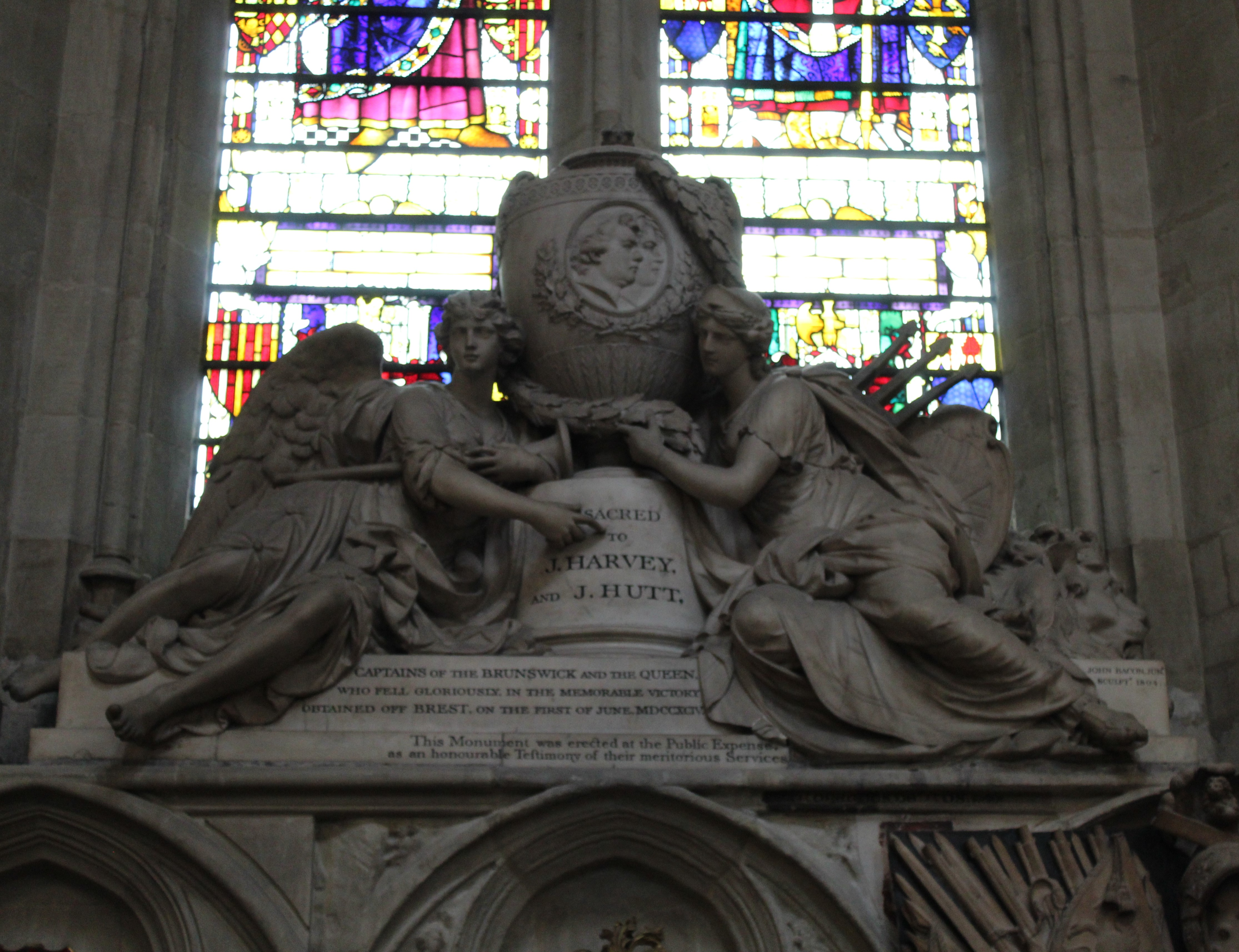
The Harvey & Hutt memorial in Westminster Abbey

Seeing his brother's predicament, Henry Harvey, who commanded HMS Ramillies sailed to his aid and raked Vengeur du Peuple twice, killing dozens of her crew and finally driving the ships apart. Both resembled wrecks, Vengeur du Peuple clearly sinking from the huge holes blasted in her sides. She finally surrendered to HMS Culloden and HMS Alfred who came up at the close of the battle, but her submission was too late and over 300 of her crew drowned when she suddenly heeled over and sank, the rest being picked up by British boats.

Harvey had refused to quit the deck whilst the action continued but on its conclusion was carried below as the British fleet headed for home, Brunswick reaching Spithead a few days later. Although seven French ships had been sunk or captured, the grain convoy had slipped by and reached France comparatively untouched, leaving the outcome of the campaign unclear. Harvey died of his wounds in Portsmouth on 30 June and was buried in Eastry, a memorial raised to him and Captain John Hutt (who had died of his wounds on the same day), carved by John Bacon is in Westminster Abbey. Two of Harvey's sons, Sir John Harvey and Sir Edward Harvey would later become admirals in their own right.
