= HMS Rose (1783) =

Enterprise-class Royal Navy frigate

- Rose

History

Great Britain
- Name: HMS Rose
- Ordered: 15 March 1782
- Builder: Joshua Stewart and Mr Hall, Sandgate, Kent
- Laid down: June 1782
- Launched: 1 July 1783
- Completed: 23 October 1783
- Commissioned: August 1783
- Fate: Wrecked off Jamaica, 28 June 1794

General characteristics
- Class & type: Enterprise-class sixth-rate frigate
- Tons burthen: 59855/94 (bm)
- Length: Overall:120 ft 5 1/2 in (36.7 m); Keel:99 ft 5 in (30.3 m)
- Beam: 33 ft 7 3/4 in (10.3 m)
- Depth of hold: 11 ft 0 in (3.4 m)
- Sail plan: Full-rigged ship
- Complement: 200 officers and men
- Armament: Gun deck: 24 × 9-pounder guns; QD: 4 × 6-pounder guns + 4 × 18-pounder carronades; Fc: 2 × 18-pounder carronades

HMS Rose was a 28-gun Enterprise-class sixth-rate frigate of the Royal Navy. Rose was first commissioned in August 1783 under the command of Captain James Hawkins.

== Fate ==
Rose, under the command of Captain Matthew Scott, left Port Royal, Jamaica on 26 June 1794. The next day she encountered a merchant vessel that passed on the news that Admiral Sir John Jervis and his fleet were off Basse Terre, which news led Scott to attempt to meet up with them. The night of 28 June was dark and rain squalls hid the sound of breakers, with the result that at 9pm Rose hit a reef off Rocky Point, Jamaica. The crew threw guns overboard and cut away her anchors, top masts and mizzen-mast, all in a futile attempt to lighten her and get her off the rocks. In the morning, as she filled with water, her crew abandoned ship in her boats and on rafts that they fashioned out of booms and spars.
