= HMS Prince of Wales (1794) =

1794 Boyne-class ship of the line of the Royal Navy

- Prince of Wales (centre) at the Battle of Cape Finisterre

History

Great Britain
- Name: HMS Prince of Wales
- Ordered: 29 November 1783
- Builder: Portsmouth Dockyard
- Laid down: May 1784
- Launched: 28 June 1794
- Fate: Broken up, 1822
- Notes: Participated in: Battle of Groix; Battle of Cape Finisterre

General characteristics
- Class & type: Boyne-class ship of the line
- Tons burthen: 2,024 1/94 (bm)
- Length: 182 ft 3 in (55.55 m) (gundeck); 149 ft 11.375 in (45.70413 m) (keel)
- Beam: 50 ft 3 in (15.32 m)
- Depth of hold: 21 ft 9 in (6.63 m)
- Propulsion: Sails
- Sail plan: Full-rigged ship
- Armament: 98 guns: Gundeck: 28 × 32-pounder guns; Middle gundeck: 30 × 18-pounder guns; Upper gundeck: 30 × 12-pounder guns; QD: 8 × 12-pounder guns; Fc: 2 × 12-pounder guns

HMS Prince of Wales was a 98-gun second-rate ship of the line of the Royal Navy, launched on 28 June 1794 at Portsmouth.

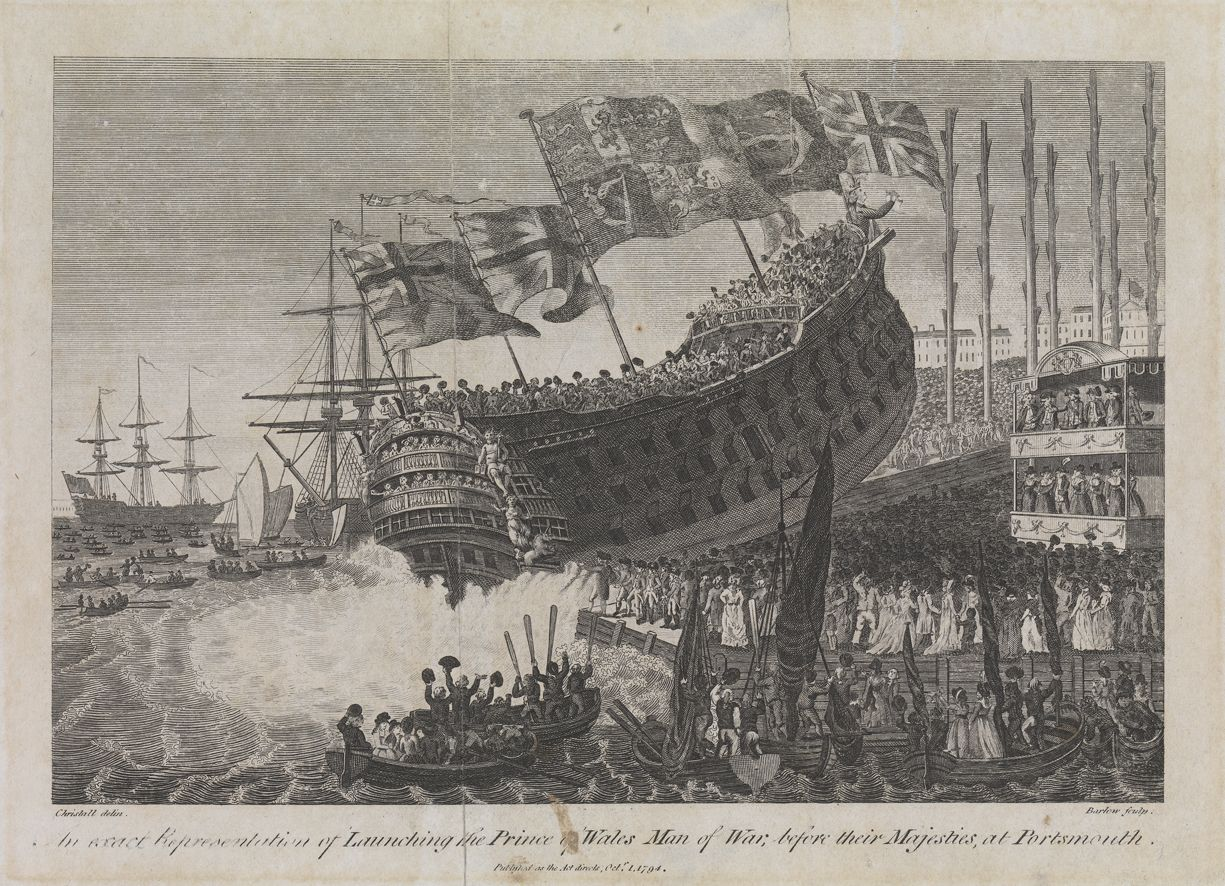
The launching of Prince of Wales

In the spring of 1795, she served as the flagship of Admiral Henry Harvey who commanded a squadron in the North Sea and later participated in the Battle of Groix in 1795. She was under command of Lord Hugh Seymour on 3 May 1800. Prince of Wales served as the flagship of Admiral Robert Calder at the Battle of Cape Finisterre in 1805. She was not present at Trafalgar. In consequence of the strong feeling against him for his conduct at Cape Finisterre, Calder had demanded a court-martial. Nelson was ordered to send Calder home, and allowed him to return in his own flagship, even though battle was imminent. Calder left in early October 1805, missing the battle.

Prince of Wales was broken up in December 1822.
