= Charles Hamilton =

Charles Hamilton may refer to:

== Aristocracy ==
- Charles Hamilton, 5th Earl of Abercorn (died 1701), Scottish peer
- Charles Hamilton, 5th Earl of Haddington (1650–1685), Scottish nobleman
- Charles Hamilton, 8th Earl of Haddington (1753–1828), Scottish nobleman
- Charles Hamilton, Count of Arran (1691–1754)
- Charles Hamilton, Count of Arran (1738–1800)
- Sir Archibald Hamilton, 5th Baronet (Charles Edward Archibald Watkin Hamilton, 1876–1939), British convert to Islam
- Sir Charles John James Hamilton, 3rd Baronet (1810–1892), of the Hamilton baronets
- Charles Hamilton, 7th Earl of Selkirk (1847–1886), Scottish nobleman and officer

== Military ==
- Charles Hamilton (orientalist) (1753?–1792), British East India Company soldier, known for his English translation of Al-Hidayah
- Charles Iain Hamilton, naval historian at the University of the Witwatersrand, Johannesburg, South Africa
- Charles Powell Hamilton (1747–1825), Royal Navy admiral
- Charles R. Hamilton, US Army general and former commander of the United States Army Materiel Command
- Charles S. Hamilton (admiral) (born 1952), US Navy admiral
- Charles S. Hamilton (philatelist) (1882–1968), US Army colonel and philatelist
- Charles Smith Hamilton (1822–1891), Union Army general during the American Civil War

== Politics and government ==
- Charles Hamilton, Lord Binning (1697–1732), Scottish politician
- Charles Hamilton (MP, died 1710) (bef. 1640–1710), Irish member of parliament
- Charles Hamilton (MP, born 1704) (1704–1786), member of parliament for Truro
- Sir Charles Hamilton, 1st Baronet (1845–1928), British member of parliament for Rotherhithe, 1885–1892
- Sir Charles Hamilton, 2nd Baronet, of Marlborough House (1767–1849), governor of the colony of Newfoundland
- Charles A. Hamilton, administrator of the British Indian Ocean Territory in 2005
- Charles Edward Hamilton (1844–1919), Canadian politician
- Charles Hadley Hamilton (1850–1915), Wisconsin lawyer and politician, son of Charles Smith Hamilton
- Charles James Hamilton (1855–1937), Conservative member of the Canadian House of Commons
- Charles Mann Hamilton (1874–1942), US representative from New York, House minority whip
- Charles McGill Hamilton (1878–1952), Canadian farmer and political figure in Saskatchewan
- Charles Memorial Hamilton (1840–1875), US Representative from Florida
- Charles V. Hamilton (1929–2023), political scientist and civil rights leader

== Other fields ==
- Charles Hamilton (bishop) (1834–1919), Anglican bishop of Ottawa
- Charles Hamilton (female husband) (born c. 1721–1724), woman who married while living as a man
- Charles Hamilton (handwriting expert) (1913–1996), American paleographer, handwriting expert and author of historical works
- Charles Hamilton (rapper) (born 1987), American rapper
- Charles Hamilton (writer) (1876–1961), English story writer, primarily under the pen name Frank Richards
- Charles H. Hamilton, one-time editor of the libertarian The Freeman journal
- Charles K. Hamilton (1885–1914), early American aviator
- Chuck Hamilton (1939–2023), Canadian ice hockey player
- Charles "Uncle Chucc" Hamilton, a member of the production and songwriting collective 1500 or Nothin'

== Fictional characters ==
- Charles Hamilton, Scarlett O'Hara's first husband and Melanie Hamilton's brother in Gone with the Wind

== See also ==
- Hamilton, Charles (album), an album by rapper Charles Hamilton
- Charles Baillie-Hamilton (disambiguation)
