= Charles S. Hamilton =

Charles S. Hamilton may refer to:

- Charles Smith Hamilton (1822–1891), Union Army general during the American Civil War
- Charles S. Hamilton (philatelist) (1882–1968), US Army colonel and philatelist
- Charles S. Hamilton (admiral) (born 1952), US Navy admiral

== See also ==
- Charles Hamilton (disambiguation)
