= George Miller Bligh =

British Royal Navy officer (1780–1834)

Captain George Miller Bligh
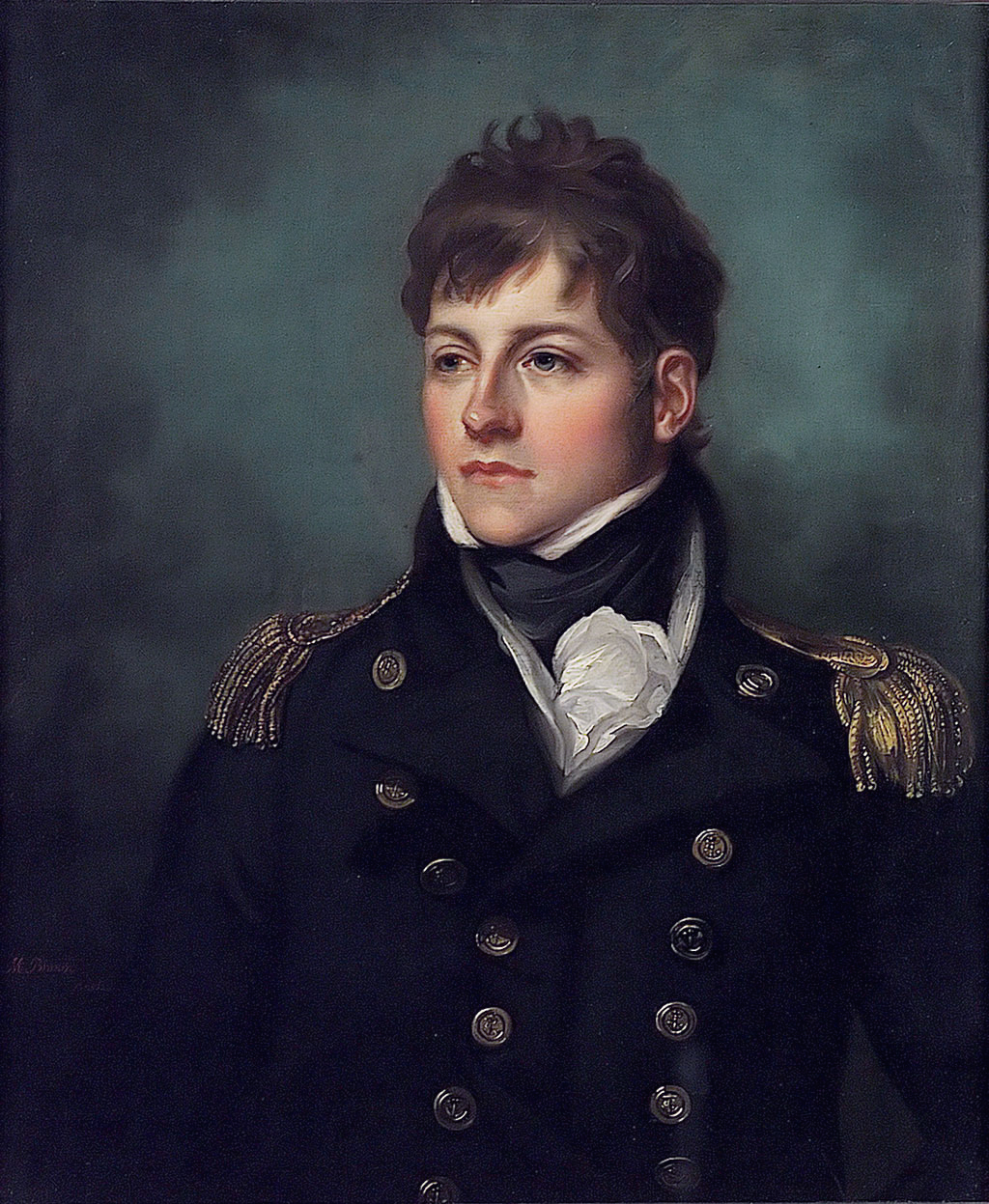
- George Miller Bligh in 1808, painted by Mather Brown
- Born: 1780
- Died: 1834 (aged 53–54); Southampton, Hampshire
- Relatives: Richard Rodney Bligh (father)
- Military career
- Allegiance: United Kingdom of Great Britain and Ireland
- Branch: Royal Navy
- Service years: 1794 – 1834
- Rank: Captain
- Commands: HMS Pylades; HMS Glatton; HMS Acorn; HMS Araxes
- Conflicts: French Revolutionary Wars; Action of 6 November 1794; Napoleonic Wars; Battle of Trafalgar (WIA)

Captain George Miller Bligh (1780–1834) was an officer of the Royal Navy, who saw service during the French Revolutionary and Napoleonic Wars, eventually rising to the rank of Captain. He was present aboard HMS Victory at the Battle of Trafalgar, and was badly wounded during the action. He was taken below and was present in the cockpit at the death of Vice-Admiral Horatio Nelson.

== Family and early life ==
Bligh was born in 1780, the only son of Richard Rodney Bligh, who was later to become an Admiral, and his first wife Ann Worsley. The younger Bligh followed his father into the navy, joining his father's ship HMS Alexander as a midshipman in 1794. Shortly after this a French squadron captured Alexander in an action on 6 November 1794. Bligh became a prisoner of war at Brest, spending six months there until he was able to escape and return to England. He went on to serve aboard a number of ships, including HMS Brunswick, HMS Agincourt, HMS Quebec, and HMS Endymion. He was promoted to lieutenant while serving aboard Endymion in 1801. He returned to serving aboard the Brunswick after this, before being transferred aboard Nelson's flagship HMS Victory in 1804.

== Trafalgar ==
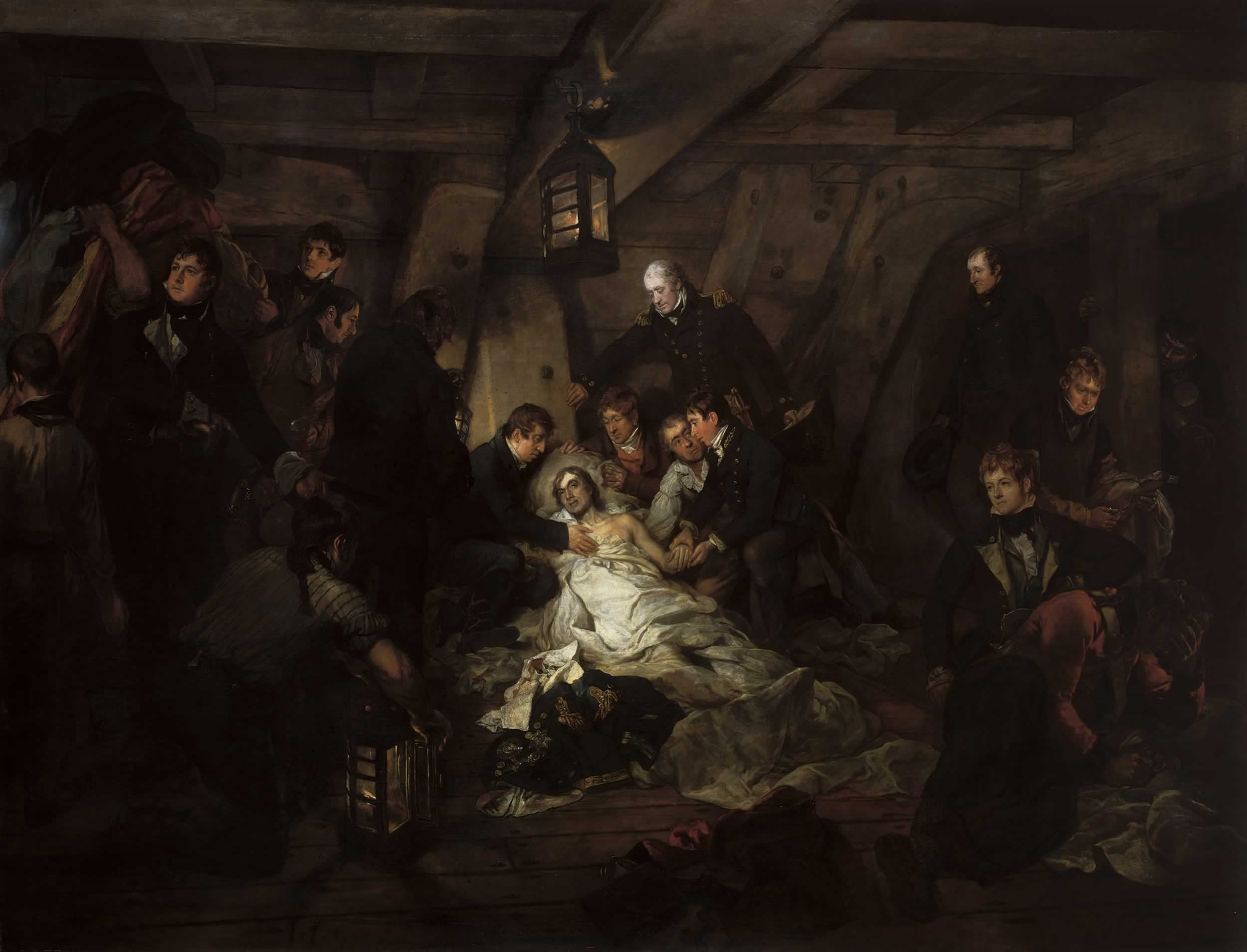
Devis's painting, with Bligh depicted in the far right, facing to the left and holding his side.

Bligh was present at Trafalgar as commander of Victory's forecastle, where he was wounded in the head and hit by a musket ball in the breast, becoming one of the high proportion of officers to be killed or wounded in the battle. Victory's signal Lieutenant John Pasco was also wounded in the battle, while Lieutenant William Ram was killed. Bligh was carried below to be seen by the surgeon William Beatty. He was in the cockpit during the last hours of the mortally wounded Nelson's life, and was depicted in Arthur William Devis's painting The Death of Nelson, 21 October 1805. Bligh is depicted apparently dazed from a head wound, and with his left hand over the wound in his side. Bligh survived the battle and recovered in time to be present at Nelson's funeral. He was in a mourning coach on the morning of 8 January, along with Captain Henry William Bayntun, who had commanded HMS Leviathan at Trafalgar, and Captain Thomas Hardy, of the Victory, as well as fellow Victory lieutenant Andrew King. Bligh was promoted to commander on 25 January 1806, in the rewards bestowed to those who had fought at Trafalgar. He was appointed to command the sloop HMS Pylades and despatched to escort a convoy from Falmouth to the Mediterranean.

== Command ==
Bligh remained in command of the Pylades for the next three years, distinguishing his time aboard her with the capture of the French privateer Grand Napoleon on 2 May 1808. A few days earlier, on 26 April, Bligh had also captured the French tartane St Honoré, which had been carrying 700 musket barrels and locks.

Bligh was promoted to post-captain on 27 December 1808 and by early 1809 he was aboard HMS Glatton, escorting a convoy back to England from Malta. He was then appointed to the 18-gun sloop HMS Acorn, which was part of the British squadron protecting their base on the island of Lissa. When three suspicious sails were sighted early in the morning of 28 November, the British squadron put to sea, leaving Bligh, in Acorn, in charge of the station while the rest of the squadron fought an action the next day that resulted in a British victory. Bligh was appointed to the frigate HMS Araxes in 1814, and sailed her to serve on the Jamaica station. He returned to Britain in July 1816, where Araxes was paid off and Bligh went ashore. He does not appear to have been actively employed again at sea.

== Personal life ==
Bligh married Catherine Haynes on 2 December 1817. He died at Southampton in 1834 and was buried at Alverstoke.
