= HMS Belleisle (1795) =

Ship of the line of the Royal Navy

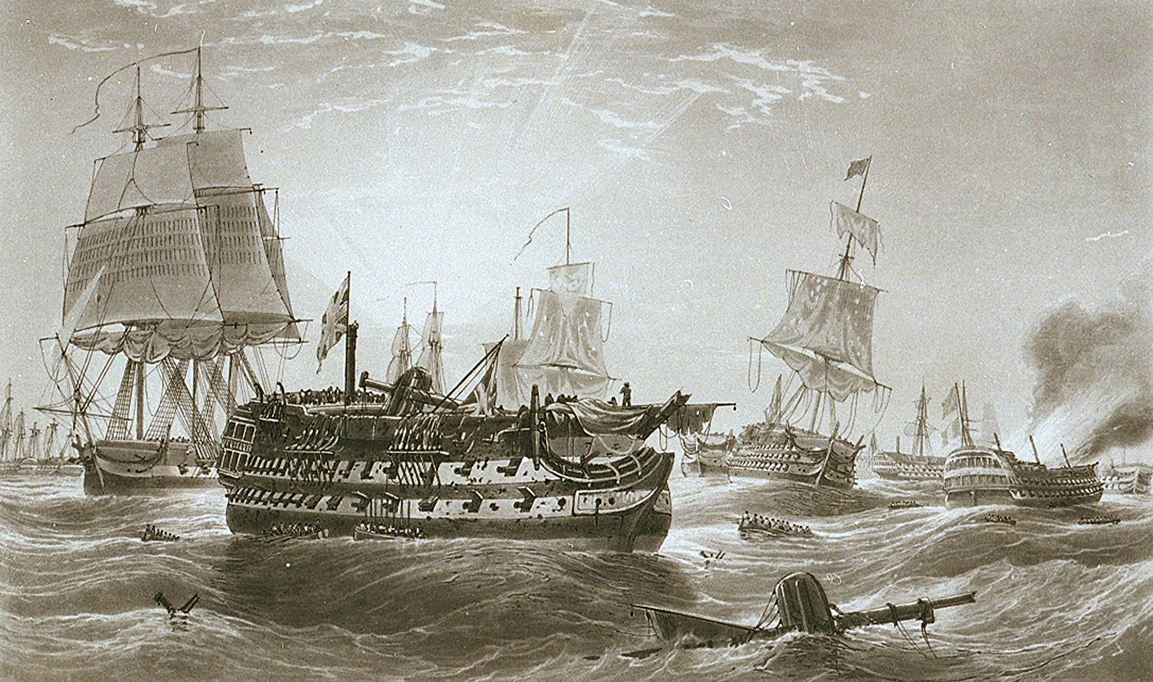
- Belleisle after the Battle of Trafalgar

History

France
- Name: Lion, Marat, Formidable
- Namesake: Jean-Paul Marat
- Builder: Rochefort shipyard
- Laid down: August 1791 as Lion
- Launched: 29 April 1794
- Commissioned: June 1794
- Renamed: Marat, 28 September 1793; Formidable, 25 May 1795
- Captured: at the Battle of Groix, 23 June 1795

Great Britain
- Name: Belleisle
- Acquired: 23 June 1795
- Fate: Broken up, 1814

General characteristics
- Class & type: Téméraire-class ship of the line
- Displacement: 3,069 tonneaux
- Tons burthen: 1,537 port tonneaux
- Length: 55.87 metres (183.3 ft) (172 pied)
- Beam: 14.90 metres (48 ft 11 in)
- Draught: 7.26 metres (23.8 ft) (22 pied)
- Propulsion: Up to 2,485 m^{2} (26,750 sq ft) of sails
- Armament: Lower gundeck: 28 × 36-pounder long guns; Upper gundeck: 30 × 18-pounder long guns; Fc and QD: 16 × 8-pounder long guns and 4 × 36-pounder carronades

Lion was a 74-gun Téméraire-class ship of the line of the French Navy, which later served in the Royal Navy. She was named Lion on 23 April 1790 and built at Rochefort from August 1791 until June 1794. She was renamed Marat on 28 September 1793 (7 months before being launched) and then Formidable on 25 May 1795, with the changing fortunes of the French Revolution.

She took part in the action of 6 November 1794, managing to rake HMS Alexander.

== Capture in the Battle of Groix ==
Fighting under captain Linois on 23 June 1795 at the Battle of Groix, she was captured by HMS Barfleur near the French port of Lorient. She was taken into service in the Royal Navy, but because the Navy already had a Formidable, she was renamed Belleisle, apparently in the mistaken belief that she had been captured off Belle Île, rather than the Île de Groix.

== Battle of Trafalgar 1805 ==
Captained by William Hargood, she was the second ship in the British lee column at the Battle of Trafalgar in 1805, and as such was engaged by the Franco-Spanish ships Achille, Aigle, Neptune, Fougueux, Santa Ana, Monarca and San Juan Nepomuceno. She was soon completely dismasted (the only British ship which suffered that fate), unable to manœuvre and largely unable to fight, as her sails blinded her batteries, but kept flying her flag for 45 minutes until the British ships behind her in the column came to her rescue. With 33 dead and 93 wounded, she was then towed to Gibraltar after the battle by the frigate HMS Naiad.

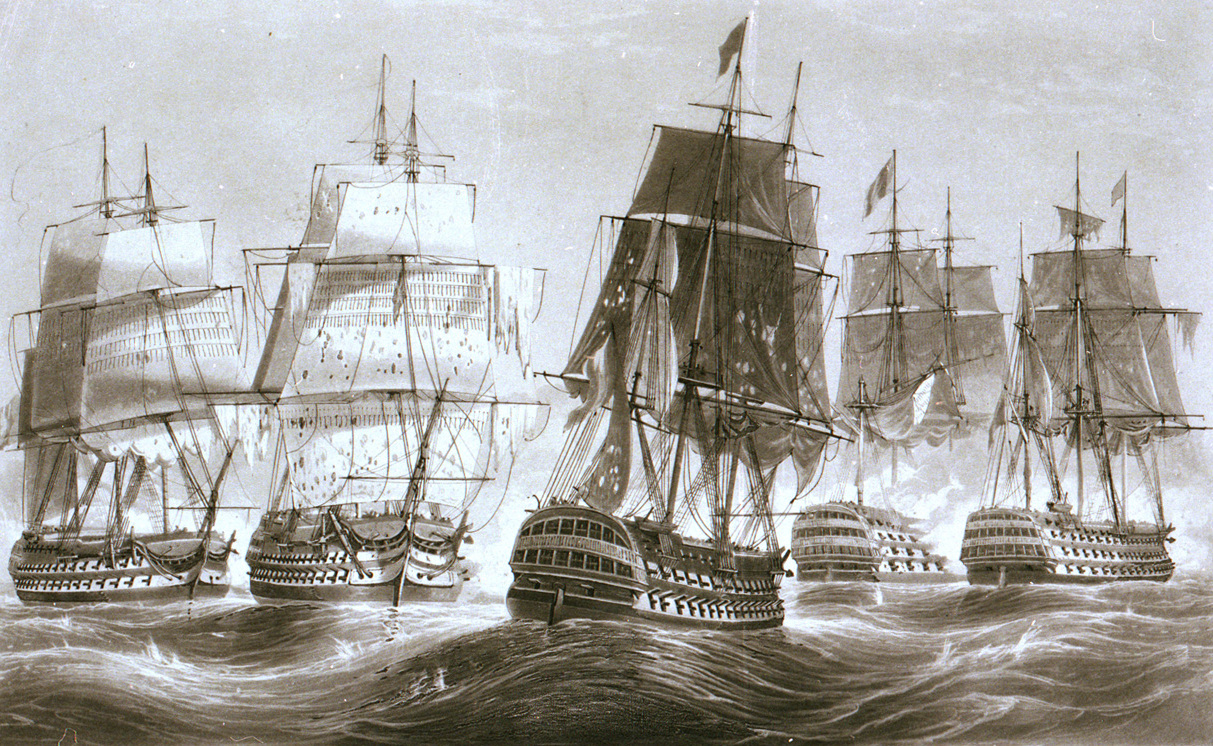
Belleisle, fifteen minutes past noon at Trafalgar

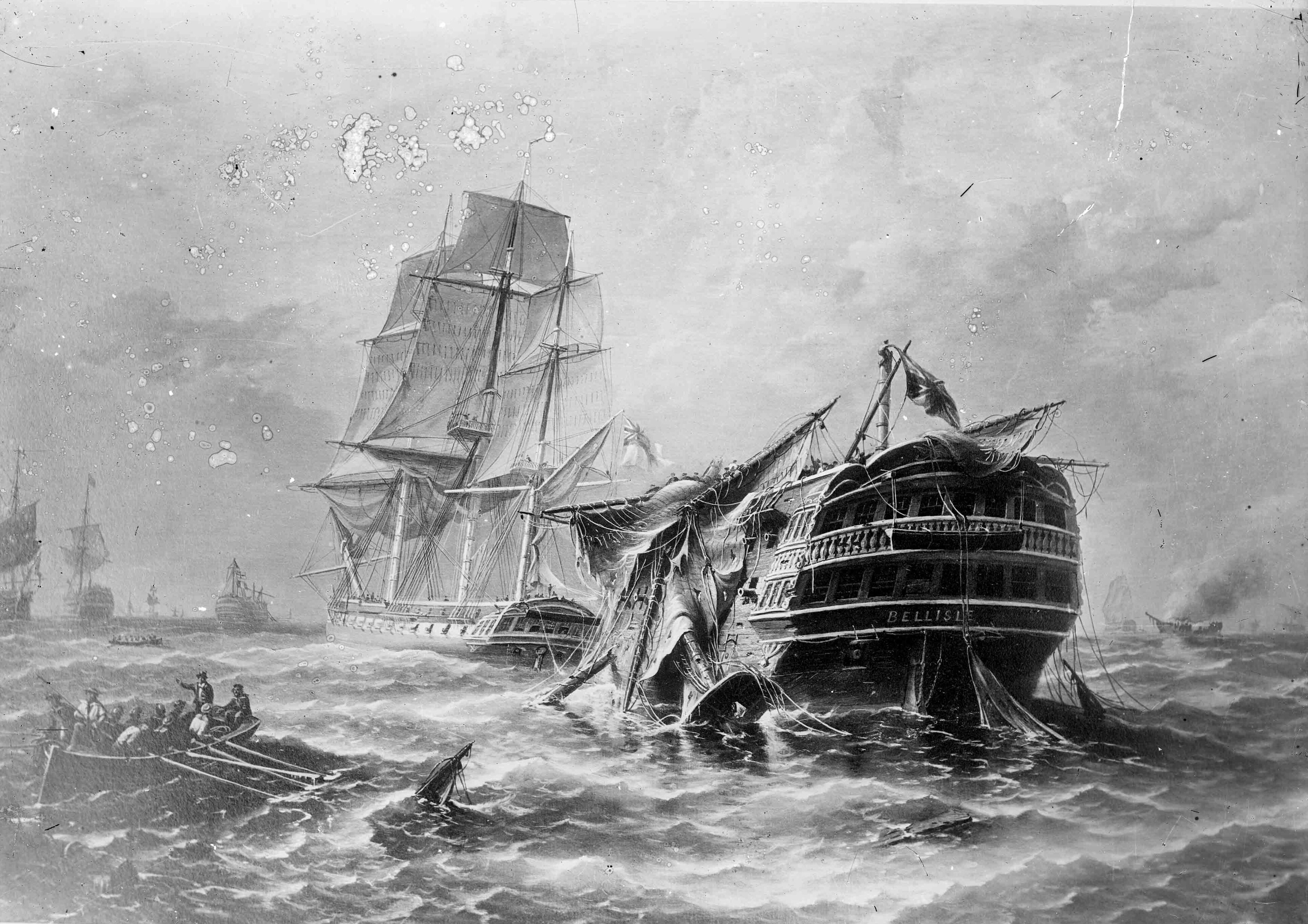
The dismasted Belleisle later on in the battle

== Danish West Indies 1807 ==
Following the concern in Britain that neutral Denmark was entering an alliance with Napoleon, the Belleisle sailed as the flagship of Rear-Admiral Alexander Cochrane, who commanded the squadron of ships that was sent to occupy the Danish West Indies. The squadron, which included HMS Prince George, HMS Northumberland, HMS Canada, HMS Ramillies and HMS Cerberus, captured Telemaco, Carvalho, and Master on 17 April 1807. The actual occupation of the Danish West Indies did not occur until December, after receipt of news of the second battle of Copenhagen.

== Channel Fleet ==
From 1811 she was in Portsmouth harbour, and in 1814 the decision was taken to have her broken up.
