= Charlie Bailey =

Charlie Bailey may refer to:

- Charlie Bailey (American football) (born 1940), American football coach
- Charlie Bailey (footballer) (born 1997), English footballer
- Charlie Bailey (politician) (born 1983), American politician, incumbent chair of the Democratic Party of Georgia

== See also ==
- Charles Bailey (disambiguation)
