= Admiral Hamilton =

Admiral Hamilton may refer to:

- Frederick Hamilton (Royal Navy officer) (1856–1917), British Royal Navy admiral
- Sir Charles Hamilton, 2nd Baronet, of Marlborough House (1767–1849), British Royal Navy admiral
- Charles Powell Hamilton (1747–1825), British Royal Navy admiral
- Charles S. Hamilton (born 1952), U.S. Navy rear admiral
- Sir Edward Hamilton, 1st Baronet (1772–1851), British Royal Navy admiral
- James Hamilton, 1st Earl of Arran (1767–1849), British Royal Navy admiral
- John Graham Hamilton (1910–1994), British Royal Navy admiral
- Louis Keppel Hamilton (1890–1957), British Royal Navy admiral
- Richard Vesey Hamilton (1829–1912), British Royal Navy admiral
- Tom Hamilton (American football) (1905–1994), U.S. Navy rear admiral
- William Hamilton, Duke of Hamilton (1634–1694), Lord High Admiral of Scotland

== See also ==
- William Baillie-Hamilton (1803–1881), British Royal Navy admiral
