= Admiral Bligh (disambiguation) =

William Bligh (1754–1817) was a Royal Navy rear admiral. Admiral Bligh may refer to:

- John Bligh (Royal Navy officer) (1770–1831), British Royal Navy rear admiral
- Richard Rodney Bligh (1737–1821), British Royal Navy admiral
