= Charles Bayly =

Charles Bayly may refer to:

- Charles Bayly (governor) (fl. c. 1630–1680), first overseas governor of the Hudson's Bay Company
- Charles Ellis Bayly (1797–?), English cricketer
- Charles Henville Bayly (1807–1873), English cricketer

== See also ==
- Sir Charles Bayley (1854–1935), British colonial administrator in India
- Charles Bailey (disambiguation)
