= HMS Ramillies (1785) =

Ship of the line of the Royal Navy

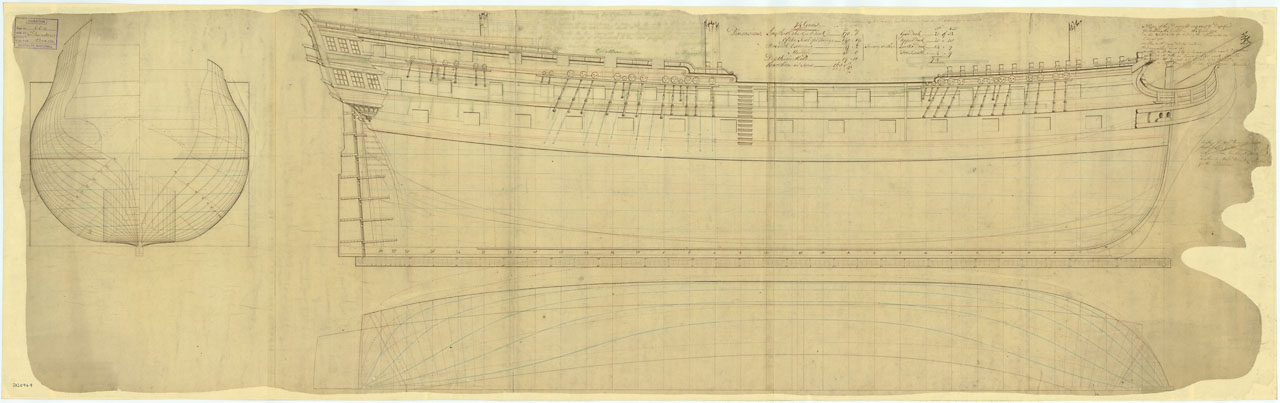
- Hull plan of Ramillies

History

Great Britain
- Name: HMS Ramillies
- Ordered: 19 June 1782
- Builder: Randall, Rotherhithe
- Laid down: December 1782
- Launched: 12 July 1785
- Commissioned: February 1793
- Fate: Broken up, February 1850

General characteristics
- Class & type: Culloden-class ship of the line
- Tons burthen: 1677 17/94 (bm)
- Length: 170 ft 4 in (51.92 m) (gundeck); 139 ft 9 in (42.60 m) (keel)
- Beam: 47 ft 6 in (14.48 m)
- Depth of hold: 19 ft 11 1/2 in (6.083 m)
- Propulsion: Sails
- Sail plan: Full-rigged ship
- Armament: Gundeck: 28 × 32-pounder guns; Upper gundeck: 28 × 18-pounder guns; QD: 14 × 9-pounder guns; Fc: 4 × 9-pounder guns

HMS Ramillies was a 74-gun third rate ship of the line of the Royal Navy, launched on 12 July 1785 at Rotherhithe. However, it was not actually commissioned by the Navy until February 1793. Its first Captain was Henry Harvey.

== French Revolutionary Wars ==
On 1 June 1794, Ramillies took part in the first fleet action of the French Revolutionary Wars, a British victory which became known as the Glorious First of June.

On 4 April 1796, Ramillies ran down and sank the hired armed lugger Spider while maneuvering.

In 1801, Ramillies was part of Admiral Sir Hyde Parker's reserve squadron at the Battle of Copenhagen, and so did not take an active part in the battle.

== Expedition to occupy the Danish West Indies (1807) ==
In 1807 Ramillies was in the West Indies as part of a squadron under the command of Rear-Admiral Alexander Cochrane, who sailed in HMS Belleisle. The squadron, which included HMS Prince George, HMS Northumberland, HMS Canada and HMS Cerberus, captured the Telemaco, Carvalho and Master on 17 April 1807.

Following concern in Britain that neutral Denmark was entering an alliance with Napoleon, in December Ramillies participated in Cochrane's expedition that captured the Danish islands of St Thomas on 22 December and Santa Cruz on 25 December. The Danes did not resist and the invasion was bloodless.

== War of 1812 ==
In August 1812, Sir Thomas Masterman Hardy took command of Ramillies and was sent to North America at the outbreak of the War of 1812. Hardy led the fleet in Ramillies that escorted and transported the army commanded by John Coape Sherbrooke which captured significant portions of eastern coastal Maine (then part of Massachusetts), including Fort Sullivan, Eastport, Machias, Bangor, and Castine.

On 4 December 1813 Ramilies and Loire recaptured the whaler Policy, J.Bowman, master, which the United States Navy had captured in the South Pacific. Her captors sent Policy into Halifax, Nova Scotia.

However, on 10 August 1814, a landing party from Ramillies was defeated at Stonington, Connecticut. The party was to have burned Stonington Borough and the shipping, but was repulsed.

During the Battle of North Point, a composite battalion of Royal Marines were landed from HMS Tonnant, HMS Ramillies, HMS Albion, and HMS Royal Oak, under the command of Brevet Major John Robyns. The two fatalities were from HMS Ramillies. From Baltimore Ramillies sailed to New Orleans where her boats participated in the battle of Lake Borgne in December 1814. At the end of January 1815, the prisoners of war from the Battle of Lake Borgne were transported to the Caribbean in HMS Ramillies. In 1847 the Admiralty issued a clasp (or bar) marked "14 Dec. Boat Service 1814" to survivors of the boat service who claimed the clasp to the Naval General Service Medal. (Note: The 'Names of Ships for which Claims have been proved' are as follows: warships Tonnant, Norge, Royal Oak, Ramillies, Bedford, Armide, Cydnus, Trave, Seahorse, Sophie, Meteor; troopships Gorgon, Diomede, Alceste, Belle Poule)

== Post-war ==
In June 1815 Ramillies was under the command of Captain Charles Ogle. In November, Captain Thomas Boys replaced Ogle, while Rear-Admiral Sir William Hope raised his flag in her at Leith.

In June 1818 Ramillies was at Sheerness, being fitted as a guardship. Captain Aiskew Hollis took command in September as Ramillies took up a post as guardship at Portsmouth. While at Portsmouth she employed a HMS Viper as a tender. On 30 November 1820 and 6 February 1821, Viper made some captures, presumably of smugglers, that resulted in a payment of prize money not only to the officers and crew of Viper, but also of Ramillies. (Note: The Flag officers share was worth £43 8s 5 3/4d. A first-class, i.e., Hollis's share, was worth £165 7s 2 1/2d. A sixth-class share, that of an ordinary seaman on Ramillies, was worth £2 9s 7 1/4d. For Viper's crew, a second-class share, that of her commanding officer, was worth £37 2s 2 3/4d; a sixth-class share was worth £4 0s 9 3/4d.)

In August 1821, Ramillies came under the command of Captain Edward Brace and served in the Downs on the Coastal Blockade. She then underwent repairs between May 1822 and June 1823, and was fitted for a guardship at Portsmouth again. In May 1823 Captain William M'Cullock took command. In November 1825 Captain Hugh Pigot replaced M'Cullock. The Admiralty ordered Ramillies to the Reserve for Harbour Service in 1830, and Ramillies was on harbour service from 1831.

In June 1831 Ramillies was at Chatham Dockyard, being fitted as a lazaretto, a hospital for quarantine. She then moved to Sheerness to serve in that capacity. Ramillies was eventually broken up at Sheerness in February 1850.
