= Charles Powell Hamilton =

Royal Navy Admiral (1747-1825)

Admiral Charles Powell Hamilton
- Born: 26 December 1747
- Died: 12 March 1825 (aged 77)
- Relatives: Lord Anne Hamilton (father); James Hamilton, 4th Duke of Hamilton (grandfather)
- Military career
- Allegiance: United Kingdom
- Branch: Royal Navy
- Service years: –1825
- Rank: Admiral
- Commands: HMS Fortune; HMS Apollo; HMS Canada; HMS Prince
- Conflicts: Action of 13 May 1779; Action of 6 November 1794; Battle of Groix

Admiral Charles Powell Hamilton (26 December 1747 – 12 March 1825) was an officer of the Royal Navy, who saw service during the American War of Independence, and the French Revolutionary and Napoleonic Wars, eventually rising to the rank of admiral.

== Family and early life ==
Hamilton was born on 26 December 1747, the third and youngest son of Lord Anne Hamilton, who was the third and youngest son of James Hamilton, 4th Duke of Hamilton.; his middle name was from his mother, Anna Charlotta Maria Powell. He joined the navy and saw some service during the American War of Independence. After the Action of 13 May 1779 in which he commanded HMS Fortune, he was promoted to the rank of post-captain on 18 May 1779 and to command of the frigate HMS Apollo.

== War with the French ==
With the outbreak of the French Revolutionary Wars in 1793 Hamilton was assigned to command the 74-gun third rate HMS Canada. In November 1794 the Canada and the Alexander, the latter under Captain Richard Rodney Bligh, had been assigned to escort a convoy from England to Cape St Vincent. While the two warships were returning they were spotted by a French squadron under Joseph-Marie Nielly, consisting of five 74 gun ships of the line, three large frigates and a brig. Outnumbered the British ships attempted to escape, but began to be overhauled by the French. Bligh eventually turned and engaged the French, allowing Hamilton aboard the Canada to escape. After an unequal engagement during which the Alexander was reduced to a sinking condition, Bligh struck his colours. Shortly after Hamilton's return to England he was transferred to the 98-gun second rate HMS Prince. Hamilton and the Prince were assigned to the fleet under Admiral Alexander Hood, which in June 1795 came across a French fleet under Louis Thomas Villaret de Joyeuse, and which included the captured Alexander off Groix. The Alexander had been taken into the French navy after her surrender, and after an engagement termed the Battle of Groix, the British recaptured her. Though Hamilton was present, he was not directly engaged in the fighting.

== Family and later life ==
Hamilton was promoted rear-admiral on 20 February 1797, vice-admiral on 1 January 1801 and admiral on 28 April 1808. He married Lucretia Prosser in May 1777, having two sons with her. The younger, Augustus Hamilton, also joined the navy, becoming a lieutenant. Correspondence between Vice-Admiral Hamilton and Vice-Admiral Horatio Nelson in 1803 indicates that the elder Hamilton asked Nelson to find a place for his son aboard HMS Victory, but that Nelson was unable to oblige. Admiral Charles Powell Hamilton died at Fir Hill, near Droxford, Hampshire on 12 March 1825, at the age of 77.

Following the death in 1895 of William Douglas-Hamilton, 12th Duke of Hamilton without male issue, Hamilton's great-grandson, Alfred Douglas Hamilton inherited the Dukedom of Hamilton.
