= Richard Rodney Bligh =

Royal Navy Admiral (1737–1821)

Admiral Sir Richard Rodney Bligh GCB
- Born: bap. 8 November 1737; Gosport, Hampshire
- Died: 30 April 1821; Bell Vue, near Southampton, Hampshire
- Relatives: George Miller Bligh (son); John Bligh (nephew); William Bligh (third cousin)
- Military career
- Allegiance: Kingdom of Great Britain; United Kingdom
- Branch: (Kingdom of Great Britain) Royal Navy
- Service years: 1750–1821
- Rank: Admiral
- Commands: HMS Virgin; HMS Camel; HMS Nemesis; HMS Asia; HMS Excellent; HMS Alexander; Jamaica Station; Leith Station
- Conflicts: Relief of Gibraltar
- Awards: Knight Grand Cross of the Order of the Bath

Admiral Sir Richard Rodney Bligh, GCB (bap. 8 November 1737 – 30 April 1821) was a Royal Navy officer who served in the American War of Independence and French Revolutionary and Napoleonic Wars. Eventually rising to the rank of admiral, he served as Commander-in-Chief, Jamaica Station and Commander-in-Chief, Leith.

== Family and early life ==
Bligh was born into a naval family, probably in 1737, since he was baptised on 8 November 1737 at Holy Trinity Church, Gosport. His godfather was Captain George Brydges Rodney, later to win fame during the American War of Independence, rising to the rank of admiral. Bligh's father was Richard Bligh, a lieutenant in the navy, while William Bligh, of later HMS Bounty fame, was a third cousin. The younger Richard also embarked on a naval career, joining in 1750 aboard Rodney's ship, the 44-gun HMS Rainbow. By 1756 he had risen to midshipman and was serving aboard the 90-gun HMS Ramillies, then flying the flag of Admiral Sir John Byng. Bligh saw action at Byng's unsuccessful attempt to relieve Minorca, after which he was commissioned a lieutenant on 30 September 1757 aboard the 24-gun HMS Nightingale. He remained with the fleet of his patron Rodney, whom he accompanied to the West Indies. Rodney duly appointed him Master and Commander of the sloop HMS Virgin on 22 October 1762. He carried out various cruises aboard her against enemy privateers. He followed this by being made post-captain aboard HMS Camel on 6 December 1777. In January 1780 he commissioned the newly built HMS Nemesis. By 1782 he was in command of the 64-gun HMS Asia during the Relief of Gibraltar by Admiral Richard Howe.

== Command ==
On the outbreak of war with Revolutionary France, Bligh was initially commissioned to command the 74-gun HMS Excellent before being moved to HMS Alexander in 1794. He was present during the events around the Glorious First of June as part of the attached squadron under George Montagu, but did not actively participate in the engagement. By late 1794 the Alexander and the Canada had been assigned to escort a convoy from England to Cape St Vincent. While the two warships were returning they were spotted by a French squadron under Joseph-Marie Nielly, consisting of five 74 gun ships of the line, three large frigates and a brig. Outnumbered the British ships attempted to escape, but began to be overhauled by the French. Bligh eventually turned and engaged the French, allowing Canada to escape. After an unequal engagement during which Alexander was reduced to a sinking condition, Bligh struck his colours. The French took possession of Alexander, but owing to the damage both they and their prize had sustained, were compelled to abandon their cruise and return to port, thus allowing several approaching British convoys to reach port unhindered.

== Flag rank ==
Bligh was taken as a prisoner of war, but unknown to him he had been promoted to the rank of rear-admiral of the blue on 23 October 1794. He was eventually exchanged and returned to England in May 1795, where he faced the customary court-martial for the loss of his ship. He was honourably acquitted, and allowed to take up a position under Sir Peter Parker. He was then appointed as second-in-command to Sir Henry Harvey, then commander in the Windward Islands, with Bligh flying his flag aboard the 74-gun HMS Brunswick. Bligh arrived on station in September, but was then given new orders from Sir Hyde Parker, instructing him to go to the Jamaica Station and take command until Parker arrived the following month.

Bligh remained as Parker's second, being promoted to vice-admiral on 14 February 1799. Bligh however incurred the wrath of Parker when, following a major mutiny, he granted pardons to two members of the crew of HMS Hermione and recommended mercy for a third. Acting against regulations Parker forced Bligh to resign his command and return to Britain in the summer of 1799. In late 1803 Bligh was made Commander-in-Chief at Leith, and on the Coast of Scotland, serving under Lord Keith, before being promoted to the rank of Admiral of the Blue on 23 April 1804. He then resigned and retired from active service.

== Family and later life ==
Bligh married Ann Worsley, daughter of Sir Edward Worsley in 1765. They had one son, George Miller Bligh, who went on to become a captain in the Navy. The couple also had four daughters, two of whom married naval officers, and three of whom went on to have children who became naval officers. Ann died in 1797, Richard remarrying on 28 June 1800. He was appointed a GCB on 16 May 1820, and died on 30 April 1821 at his home, Bell Vue, near Southampton, Hampshire.

== Notes ==
Military offices
Preceded by William Parker	Commander-in-Chief, Jamaica Station; 1796	Succeeded by Sir Hyde Parker
