= Charles Baillie =

Charles Baillie may refer to:

- Charles Baillie (papal agent) (1542–1625)
- Charles Baillie, Lord Jerviswoode (1804–1879), Scottish politician and judge
- A. Charles Baillie (born 1939), former chairman and chief executive officer of the Toronto-Dominion Bank
- Charlie Baillie (1935–2025), Canadian football player and coach
- Charles Cochrane-Baillie, 2nd Baron Lamington (1860–1940), Governor of Queensland (1896–1901)
- Charles Baillie (swimmer) (1902–1984), later Charles Baillie Drayton, British swimmer

== See also ==
- Charles Baillie-Hamilton (disambiguation)
- Charles Bailey (disambiguation)
