= Charles Baillie-Hamilton =

Charles Baillie-Hamilton may refer to:

- Charles Baillie-Hamilton (Aylesbury MP) (1800–1865), MP for Aylesbury
- Charles Baillie-Hamilton (Bath MP) (1900–1939), MP for Bath
- Charles R. Baillie-Hamilton (1848–1927), played football for Scotland in 1870
- Charles Baillie-Hamilton (priest) (1764–1820), English Anglican priest

== See also ==
- Charles Baillie (disambiguation)
- Charles Hamilton (disambiguation)
