= Sir William Parker, 1st Baronet, of Harburn =

British naval commander

Admiral Sir William Parker Bt
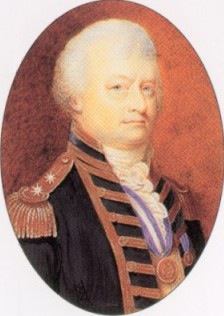
- Sir William Parker, 1st Baronet, of Harburn
- Born: 1 January 1743; Harburn, Warwickshire
- Died: 31 October 1802 (aged 59)
- Military career
- Allegiance: Kingdom of Great Britain
- Branch: Royal Navy
- Rank: Admiral
- Commands: Leeward Islands Station; Jamaica Station; North American Station
- Conflicts: American Revolutionary War

Admiral Sir William Parker, 1st Baronet (1 January 1743 – 31 October 1802), was a British naval commander. Parker served as a Royal Navy officer during the French Revolutionary Wars.

== Naval career ==
William Parker's father, Augustine Parker, had been mayor of Queenborough, Isle of Sheppey, Kent and a commander of one of the king's yachts.

William Parker entered the navy about 1756 and in 1758 was on HMS Centurion during the capture of Louisbourg in Canada and the capture of Quebec the following year.

He was promoted to lieutenant in 1762.

For a time he served off the coast of Newfoundland and was promoted to commander in 1763.

In 1777 he went to the West Indies where he served under Byron.

He served aboard various ships and as commodore and commander-in-chief on the Leeward Islands Station between 1787 and 1789. During the 1790s he served under Admiral Lord Howe. In 1794 he commanded HMS Audacious at the Battle of The Glorious First of June and was promoted to Rear-Admiral.

He saw service on the Jamaica Station in 1796. In December 1796, he was appointed as Captain of HMS Prince George. Initially assigned to the Channel Fleet under Lord Bridport, on 19 January 1797 he was detached with several ships to join the forces of Sir John Jervis in the Mediterranean Sea. He then took part under in the Battle of Cape St Vincent in 1797, where he damaged the 112-gun ship San Josef so badly that Commodore Horatio Nelson was able to board and capture her with little opposition. The following year Parker, on blockade duty off Cádiz, bitterly resented that Nelson, junior to himself, was given an independent command in the Mediterranean, but his letters to the Admiralty had no effect. This may have arisen as a result of a dispute with Jervis, who he had taken to court owing to a dispute in freight money awards. Jervis later remarked that he could neither forgive or forget Parker's attitude to him.

In 1800, Parker was appointed Commander-in-Chief in North America at Halifax, Nova Scotia. He sailed from England in June 1800. He served in the position until 1802 when he was recalled by John Jervis who had now become First Lord, for sending two ships from Halifax to the West Indies and Atlantic, contrary to standing orders to keep them nearer the Americas for defence. A court martial ensued as HMS America was damaged by grounding and HMS Cleopatra was accidentally beached, though with no damage. The Court martial took place on 13 November 1801 in Portsmouth on HMS Gladiator. He was honourably acquitted from the court martial after delivering a defence of his actions. It was stated that “the bells at Portsmouth rung immediately on the information being conveyed from the Gladiator of the acquittal of this gallant and meritorious officer, who after landed amidst the plaudits and acclamations of all descriptions of persons, and was further flattered by receiving the congratulations and greetings of all the Admirals and Heads of the Civil and Military Departments”.

== Sources ==
- Cundall, Frank (1915). Historic Jamaica. West India Committee.

Military offices
Preceded by Sir Richard Bickerton	Commander-in-Chief, Leeward Islands Station; 1787–1789	Succeeded by Sir John Laforey
Preceded by John Ford	Commander-in-Chief, Jamaica Station; 1796	Succeeded by Richard Rodney Bligh
Preceded by George Vandeput	Commander-in-Chief, North American Station; 1800–1802	Succeeded by Sir Andrew Mitchell
Baronetage of Great Britain
New creation	Baronet (of Harburn); 1797–1802	Succeeded by William George Parker
