= Invasion of the Danish West Indies =

- Part of the Caribbean campaign of 1803–1810
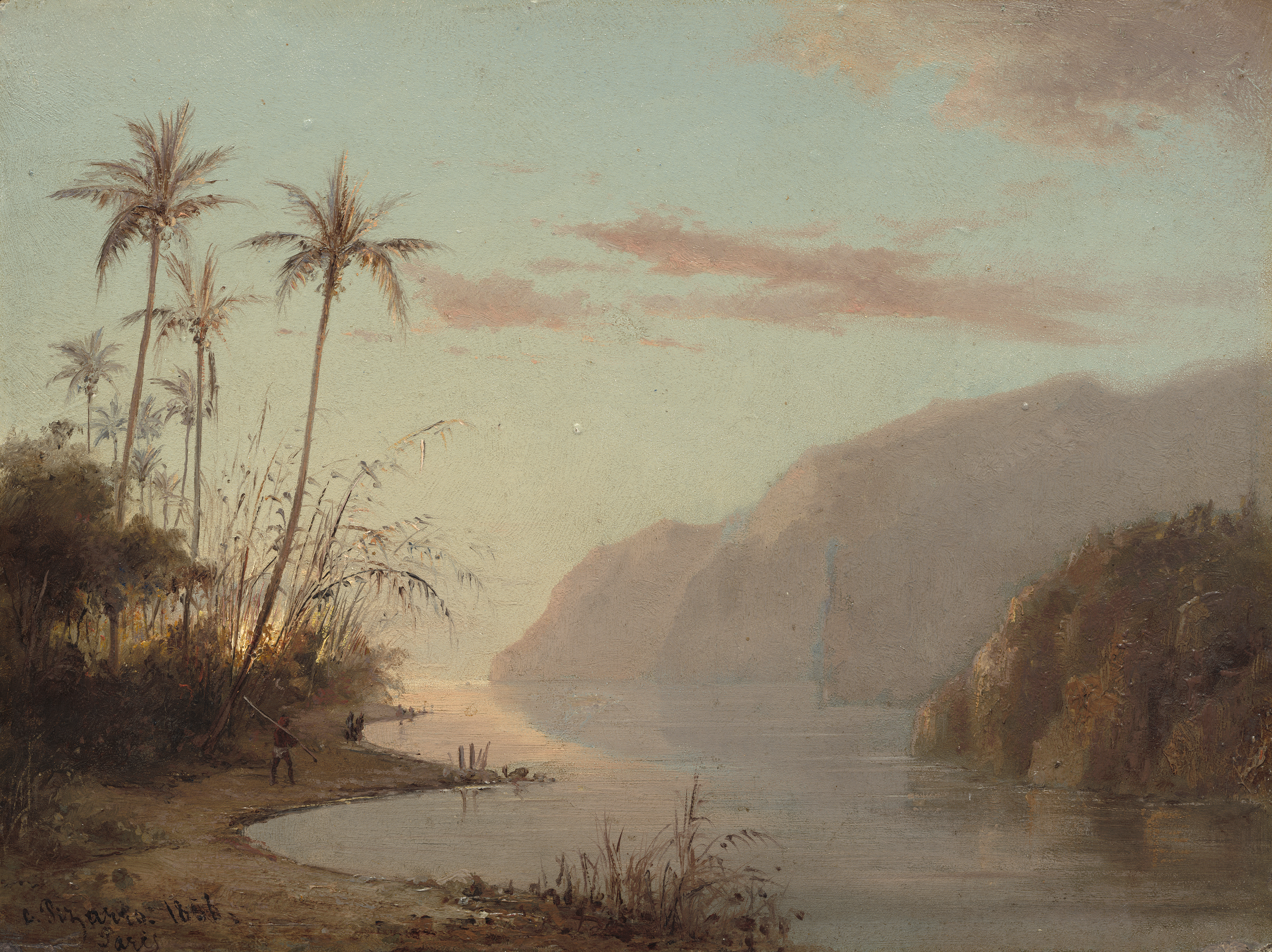
- Saint Croix, one of the islands targeted during the invasion
Date	22–25 December 1807
Location	Danish West Indies
Result	British victory

Belligerents
United Kingdom	Denmark-Norway

Commanders and leaders
Alexander Cochrane	Hans Lillienskjøld

Strength
5 ships of the line 7 frigates 7 sloops 1 schooner 2 brigs	Unknown

Casualties and losses
Minimal	Surrender of all forces

The second British Invasion of the Danish West Indies took place in December 1807 when a British fleet captured the Danish islands of Saint Thomas on 22 December and Saint Croix on 25 December. The Danes did not resist and the invasion was bloodless. This British occupation of the Danish West Indies lasted until 20 November 1815, when Britain returned the islands to Denmark.

== Background ==
During the later stages of the French Revolutionary Wars (1793–1802), Denmark–Norway, Prussia, and Sweden established the Second League of Armed Neutrality (1800–1801), intending to protect their trade in the Baltic from the British. However, Britain attacked Denmark with the First Battle of Copenhagen in April 1801. Slightly in advance of that, a British fleet arrived at St Thomas at the end of March. The Danes accepted the Articles of Capitulation the British proposed and the British occupied the islands without a shot being fired. The British occupation lasted until April 1802, when the British returned the islands to Denmark.

After the outbreak of the Napoleonic Wars, in 1804 Britain embarked on a campaign in the West Indies. By 1810, every single French, Dutch and Danish colony there was firmly under allied (mainly British) control.

The occupation of the Danish West Indies was a consequence of the British fear that Denmark–Norway would ally with Napoleon. Hostilities between Denmark–Norway and the United Kingdom broke out again by the Second Battle of Copenhagen in August 1807, when the British attacked the Danish capital to ensure that the Danish-Norwegian fleet did not fall into the hands of Napoleon.

In the West Indies, Admiral Sir Alexander Cochrane had been in readiness to invade the Danish colonies since receiving a warning on 2 September 1807 that hostilities with Denmark–Norway were likely to break out. In October vessels of the British Royal Navy started capturing Danish vessels at sea.

== The invasion ==
On 15 December 1807, HMS Fawn arrived at Barbados with the news of war with Denmark. Admiral Cochrane immediately set sail in his flagship, HMS Belleisle, together with a squadron including Prince George, Northumberland, Canada, Ramillies, Cerberus, Ethalion, and a number of other vessels. The expedition included troops from the 70th and 90th Regiments of Foot under the overall army commander, General Henry Bowyer. (Note: Bowyer was a Major-General, but had been appointed Lieutenant General in the Leeward and Windward Islands only. He commanded His Majesty's forces in the Caribbean until his death in August 1808.)

St Thomas surrendered on 22 December and St Croix on 25 December. A prize money notice in the London Gazette in 1816 gives a list of the vessels and army units that participated in the campaign. (Note: The two commanders-in-chief each received £1293 3s 5¾d. A naval captain or commander received a first-class share, which was worth £398 10s 3½d. A fifth-class share, that of a seaman, was worth £1 18s 10d.)

== Royal Navy vessels ==
This list includes both vessels that Cochrane mentioned in his dispatch concerning the invasion, and vessels mentioned in the prize money notice. The two sources overlap, but are not identical.

- Belleisle
- Blonde
- Canada
- Cerberus
- Circe
- Ethalion
- Favourite
- Fawn
- Galatea
- Hart
- Haughty
- Latona
- Lilly
- Melville
- Northumberland
- Prince George
- Pultusk
- Ramillies
- Rosario
- Saint Christopher
- Swinger
- Thais
