= John Bligh (Royal Navy officer) =

Royal Navy officer (1770–1831)

Rear-Admiral John Bligh CB
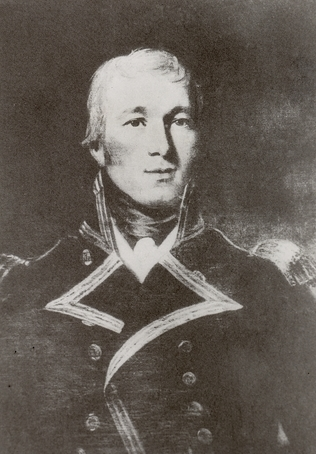
- Born: August 1770; Guildford, Surrey
- Died: 19 January 1831 (aged 60); Hambledon, Hampshire
- Relatives: Richard Rodney Bligh (uncle)
- Military career
- Allegiance: United Kingdom of Great Britain and Ireland
- Branch: Royal Navy
- Service years: 1780 – 1831
- Rank: Rear-Admiral
- Commands: HMS Kingfisher; HMS Latona; HMS Romney; HMS Agincourt; HMS Theseus; HMS Surveillante; HMS Alfred; HMS Valiant; HMS Revenge
- Conflicts: American Revolutionary War; French Revolutionary Wars; Siege of Toulon; Battle of Cape St Vincent; Napoleonic Wars; Blockade of Saint-Domingue; Battle of Copenhagen; Battle of the Basque Roads
- Awards: Companion of the Order of the Bath

Rear-Admiral John Bligh CB (August 1770 – 19 January 1831) was an officer in the Royal Navy who served during the American War of Independence and the French Revolutionary and Napoleonic Wars.

Bligh was born into a naval family and served on a variety of ships from a young age, moving up through the ranks to lieutenant prior to the outbreak of the wars with France. He was in the East Indies when war broke out, but returning to Britain he saw action in the Mediterranean during the early attacks on Corsica, the Siege of Toulon and the Battle of Cape St Vincent. Promoted to his own commands in 1797, he was the victim of a mutiny on his ship, when his crew joined the larger mutinies at Spithead, and was sent ashore. He returned after it had ended and went on to serve at Newfoundland, before beginning a long period of distinguished service in the Caribbean. He was active in the Blockade of Saint-Domingue after the outbreak of the Napoleonic Wars, and arranged the surrender and evacuation of several French-held positions. He then took charge of an expedition to Curaçao, but withdrew his forces in the face of heavy opposition. His final actions there involved several successes against enemy privateers and merchant shipping.

Returning to Britain in 1806, Bligh went out with the fleet to the Baltic and was present at the Battle of Copenhagen. He then sailed to the Portuguese coast, where he was active landing troops and supporting the army's operations there. He was involved in the Battle of the Basque Roads in 1809, directing efforts to destroy several grounded French ships. While cruising off Belle Île in 1810 he had the good fortune to intercept a French vessel carrying the wealth of the merchants of Île de France back to France. Suddenly wealthy from the prize money and in weakening health after his long service in the tropics, Bligh retired ashore. He settled on the south coast, receiving an appointment as a Companion of the Bath, and a promotion to rear-admiral before his death in 1831.

== Family and early life ==
Bligh was born in Guildford in August 1770, the son of the naval officer Commander John Bligh, and his wife Elizabeth, née Titcher.^{[a]} He attended the Royal Grammar School, Guildford until joining the Navy on 22 January 1780, becoming a captain's servant aboard the 28-gun HMS Nemesis.^{[b]} Nemesis was at this time commanded by John's uncle, Richard Rodney Bligh. After service here he was rated midshipman and moved to the 74-gun HMS Warspite on 28 August 1782. Bligh then served on a succession of ships, moving in turn to the brig-sloop HMS Trimmer, the 74-gun HMS Pegase and the sloop HMS Bulldog, the last of which he was rated as an able seaman. He was then aboard the 50-gun HMS Europa and afterwards the 20-gun HMS Camilla. He was rated as master's mate aboard the Camilla on 13 September 1786, and served on her in the West Indies.^{[c]} He passed his lieutenant's examination on 6 February 1788 but did not receive a commission immediately, instead serving aboard the 74-gun HMS Colossus, then moving to the 64-gun HMS Crown in October that year.

Crown was chosen by Commodore William Cornwallis to fly his broad pennant in his new post in the East Indies, and Bligh sailed with her to this post. He spent several years on this station, being finally commissioned lieutenant on 25 June 1791 and appointed to the 32-gun HMS Thames under Captain Thomas Troubridge. He returned to Britain aboard her in December 1791. He then joined the 28-gun HMS Lizard in 1792, under the command of Captain Sir Thomas Williams.

== French Revolutionary Wars ==
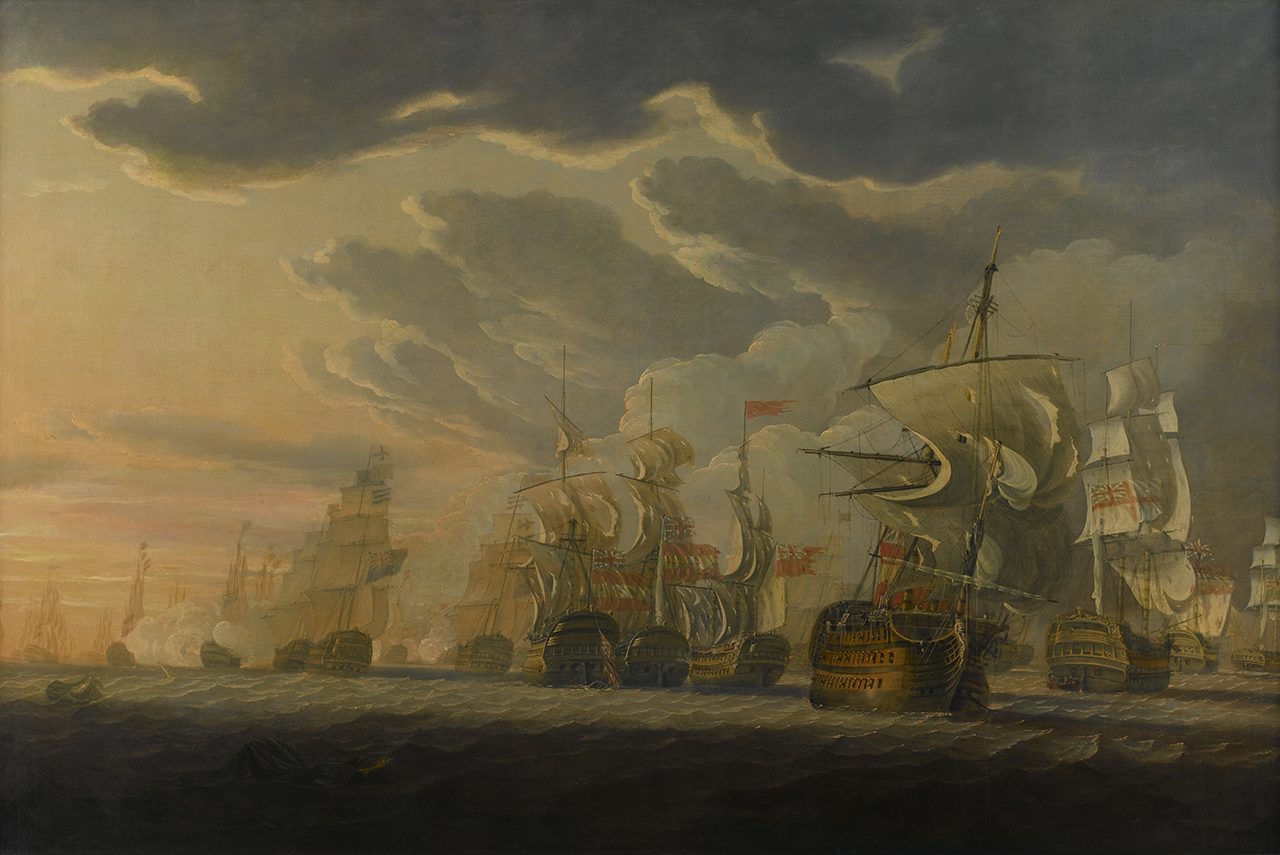
The Battle of Cape St Vincent, 14 February 1797, by Robert Cleveley. Bligh served as first-lieutenant of the 90-gun HMS Barfleur during the battle.

With the outbreak of war with Revolutionary France in February 1793, Bligh joined the 74-gun HMS Courageux under Captain William Waldegrave. Waldegrave took her out to the Mediterranean and Bligh served aboard her during operations there under Commodore Robert Linzee against the Corsican town of St Fiorenzo. From there Courageux returned to Toulon and underwent repairs, during which time Bligh served ashore in the batteries defending the town during its siege by Republican forces. He continued to serve under Waldegrave after his promotion to rear-admiral, and joined his new flagship, the 90-gun HMS Barfleur as her first-lieutenant. Bligh was present in this post at the Battle of Cape St Vincent on 14 February 1797, and having acquitted himself well in action, was promoted to commander on 8 March 1797 and given the sloop HMS Kingfisher for service on the Portuguese coast. He was only briefly in command, but while cruising off Porto was able to capture the 14-gun French privateer Général on 29 March.

Bligh was ordered to leave his ship shortly after his arrival at Lisbon, and took passage with Vice-Admiral Waldegrave back to Britain aboard the frigate HMS Flora. He was promptly advanced to post-captain on his arrival on 25 April and appointed to the 38-gun HMS Latona. Latona was at Spithead when mutinies broke out there aboard the ships anchored in the roads, and Bligh's was one of the ships affected. He was sent ashore by his crew on 12 May, but was able to return when the mutiny had ended. His distant relation, William Bligh, who had already suffered a mutiny on his ship when he commanded HMS Bounty, was also involved in the widespread unrest, the crew of his ship HMS Director mutinied at the Nore shortly afterwards. Latona then went out to Newfoundland as Waldegrave's flagship after his appointment as Commodore Governor there. Waldegrave shifted his flag to the 50-gun HMS Romney after his arrival at Newfoundland in July, retaining Bligh as his flag captain for the new command. Bligh then took command of Waldegrave's new flagship, the 64-gun HMS Agincourt, in January 1798 and commanded her until the expiration of Waldegrave's tenure at Newfoundland, in 1800.

He commissioned the 74-gun HMS Theseus in May 1801, and in December Vice-Admiral Waldegrave hoisted his flag aboard her with orders to go out the East Indies. Waldegrave struck his flag on 28 December however, and was promoted to full admiral and created Baron Radstock. Bligh instead received orders to go out to the West Indies in February 1802 and join the fleet at Jamaica under Admiral Sir George Campbell. He remained in the West Indies during the Peace of Amiens, and on the resumption of the wars with France in 1803, was assigned to support the blockade of Saint-Domingue.

== Napoleonic Wars ==
=== Blockade of Cap-Français ===
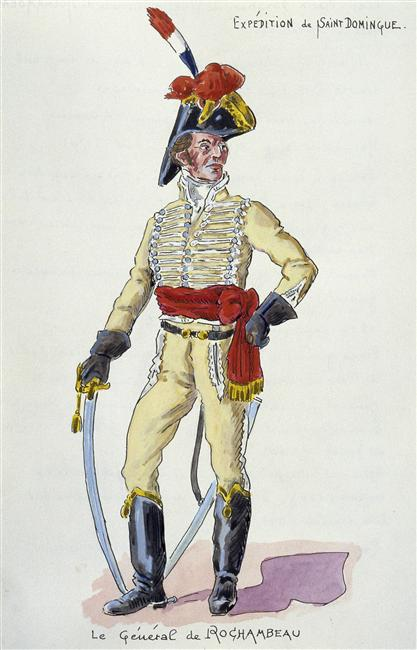
Donatien-Marie-Joseph de Vimeur, vicomte de Rochambeau, whom Bligh evacuated from Saint-Domingue

Bligh initially blockaded Cap-Français but was unable to prevent it from being resupplied by small vessels operating from Saint-Domingue's northern ports. He decided to launch an attack on Fort-Dauphin, intending on capturing it along with taking or destroying the 28-gun frigate Sagesse that lay in its harbour. Bligh anchored off the port on 8 September 1803 and bombarded Fort la Bouque. The bombardment was so well directed that fort's garrison was unable to make an effective reply and eventually surrendered. Bligh then had Theseus towed into the harbour with the ship's boats and fired several shots at Sagesse, which soon struck her colours. Due to Sagesse's capture, Fort-Dauphin's commander decided that he could no longer resist rebel forces besieging the port and approached Bligh, requesting to surrender his forces to him and have them evacuated as he feared a massacre if they fell into rebel hands. Bligh accepted their surrender and evacuated the garrison to Cap-Français after having the fort's guns spiked and its ammunition destroyed.

Upon their arrival at Cap-Français, Bligh found that the garrison there was in a desperate situation, as the port was besieged by a rebel army under Jean-Jacques Dessalines. A French general named Dumont and his entourage had been captured by rebels who planned on executing them, with Bligh securing their release after the French begged him to do so. Unable to defend Cap-Français, the garrison's commander Donatien-Marie-Joseph de Vimeur, vicomte de Rochambeau agreed to surrender the port to the rebels and evacuate by 30 November. Rochambeau then approached the commander of the British blockade, Commodore John Loring, and attempted to negotiate passage for his squadron from the port. The negotiations did not result in an acceptable agreement for either side, though Rochambeau was hopeful that his squadron would be able to escape the blockade under cover of bad weather.

By 30 November the blockade was still in force, and rebel troops began to take possession of the forts surrounding the harbour, intending on using their guns to destroy the French ships there with heated shot. Loring sent Bligh into the harbour, where he met with French Captain Henry Barré, who urged Bligh to arrange a capitulation to save the garrison and squadron from being destroyed by the rebels. Bligh agreed and obtained the formal surrender of the port to the British, and arranged with Dessalines to allow their evacuation.^{[d]} The squadron then sailed out and surrendered to the British.

=== Attack on Curaçao ===
Having performed these duties Bligh sailed to Jamaica and was given command of a squadron of three ships of the line and two frigates by Sir John Duckworth with orders to attack the Dutch-held island of Curaçao. Duckworth had received intelligence that the Dutch had not been able to reinforce the island and consequently it was only lightly defended. Bligh sailed to the island with his squadron, expecting to face only 160 men and a frigate, and with the garrison apparently having been further reduced by disease. He had permission to land troops if the Dutch refused to surrender, but Duckworth cautioned him from risking too much, partly because the plan to capture the island was Duckworth's own initiative. Bligh arrived off the island on 31 January 1804 with the 74-gun HMS Theseus and HMS Hercule, the frigates HMS Blanche and HMS Pique, and the schooner HMS Gipsy. The 74-gun HMS Vanguard had not arrived in time to join the expedition. After arriving off the island, Bligh sent an officer to negotiate with the island's governor. The Dutch refused to surrender and Bligh began to blockade the island and begin preparations to force a landing.

Using his frigates to blockade the harbour, Bligh moved his ships of the line to a small cove, and exchanged fire with a shore battery. He landed a party of sailors and marines, carrying the battery without loss and then storming the heights around the cove, driving the Dutch away with four or five casualties among the British party. Having secured a landing site, Bligh sent 600 men ashore and landed some cannon, which he placed so as to be able to bombard Fort Republique and the town of St Anne. Contrary to reports, the Dutch had received significant reinforcements and though Bligh was able to set part of the town on fire, he was forced to constantly skirmish with Dutch forces, which numbered around 500 men. Though the Dutch were continually repulsed, British losses mounted, exacerbated by outbreaks of dysentery. With no quick end to the conflict in sight, and mindful that he had been warned not to overextend himself, Bligh called off the attack on 4 March, having exhausted his ammunition of 18-pounder shot. He re-embarked his men and returned to Jamaica, having sustained losses of 18 killed and 43 wounded. Though the British force had failed to capture the island, Duckworth was sympathetic, and felt that Bligh could have succeeded had the men and guns of HMS Vanguard been at his disposal.^{[e]}

=== Return to Britain ===
Bligh remained in the Caribbean until July 1805, when Theseus became the flagship of the station's new commander, Vice-Admiral James Richard Dacres. Bligh asked Duckworth for permission to take command of the frigate HMS Surveillante, which was granted. He cruised with notable success against enemy shipping, capturing several privateers and over forty merchant vessels. He made a night-time landing on the Spanish island of Saint Andreas, capturing the garrison and the governor, and taking them away as prisoners of war. In July he was finally ordered to return to Britain, acting as an escort for a convoy 200 merchant ships. On 9 July he came across a convoy of twenty-six Spanish merchants off Havana and captured them all. Unwilling to delay his convoy, he had them all burnt, and then in company with the convoy's other escort frigate, HMS Fortunee, chased away a Spanish 74-gun ship, forcing her to anchor under the guns of the Morro Castle. Bligh arrived in Britain on 30 September 1806 and paid off Surveillante.

=== Battle of Copenhagen and Portugal ===
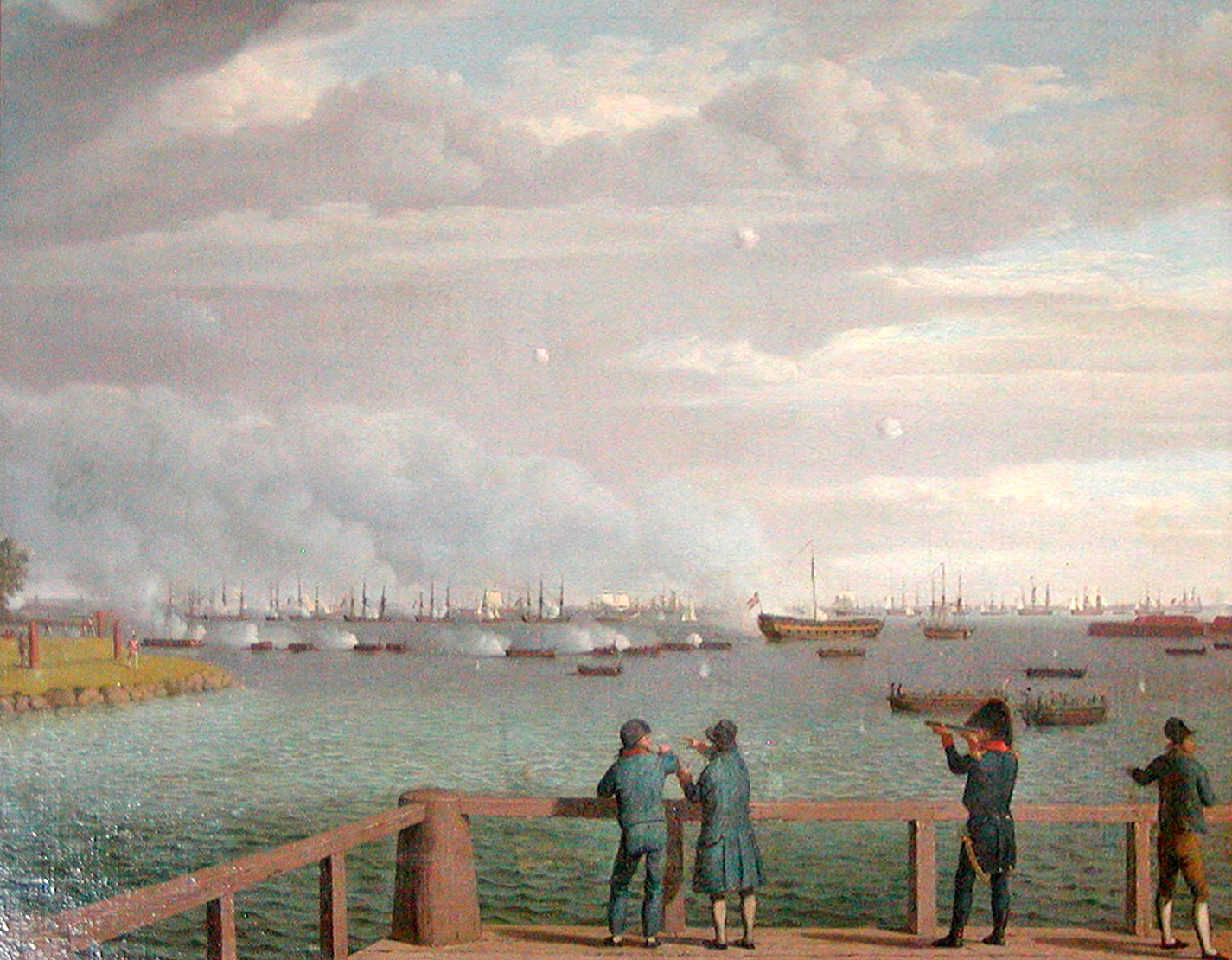
A Danish painting from 1808 depicting the Battle of Copenhagen, where Bligh had command of HMS Alfred.

Bligh did not go to sea again until March 1807, when he was given command of the 74-gun HMS Alfred and ordered to join the fleet bound for Copenhagen under Vice-Admiral James Gambier. He took part in the Battle of Copenhagen in August/September that year, resulting in the Danes being forced to surrender their fleet to the British. Bligh had special responsibility for overseeing the landing of the troops and stores during the operation. Following the successful conclusion of the campaign Bligh was sent to serve off Portugal under Admiral Sir Charles Cotton.

Cotton was asked for assistance from the inhabitants of Figueras in July 1808, threatened by the advance of the French army. Cotton sent Bligh to superintend the defence of the area and he was able to hold it with 500 marines until being reinforced by troops landed at Mondego Bay under Sir Arthur Wellesley. Bligh then re-embarked his marines, oversaw the landing of Wellesley's army, and sailed down the coast to Lisbon, supporting it from offshore. Bligh also oversaw the landing of various divisions as the army advanced, landing 3,500 men under General Robert Anstruther on 18 August and 6,500 men under General Wroth Palmer Acland on 20 August. Bligh also landed Sir John Moore's force and continued to support the army, being involved at the Battle of Vimeiro on 21 August 1808. Bligh then rejoined Sir Charles Cotton at Lisbon and was assigned to the escort to Britain of the Russian fleet under Admiral Dmitry Senyavin, which had surrendered to the British under the terms of the Convention of Cintra.

=== Basque Roads ===
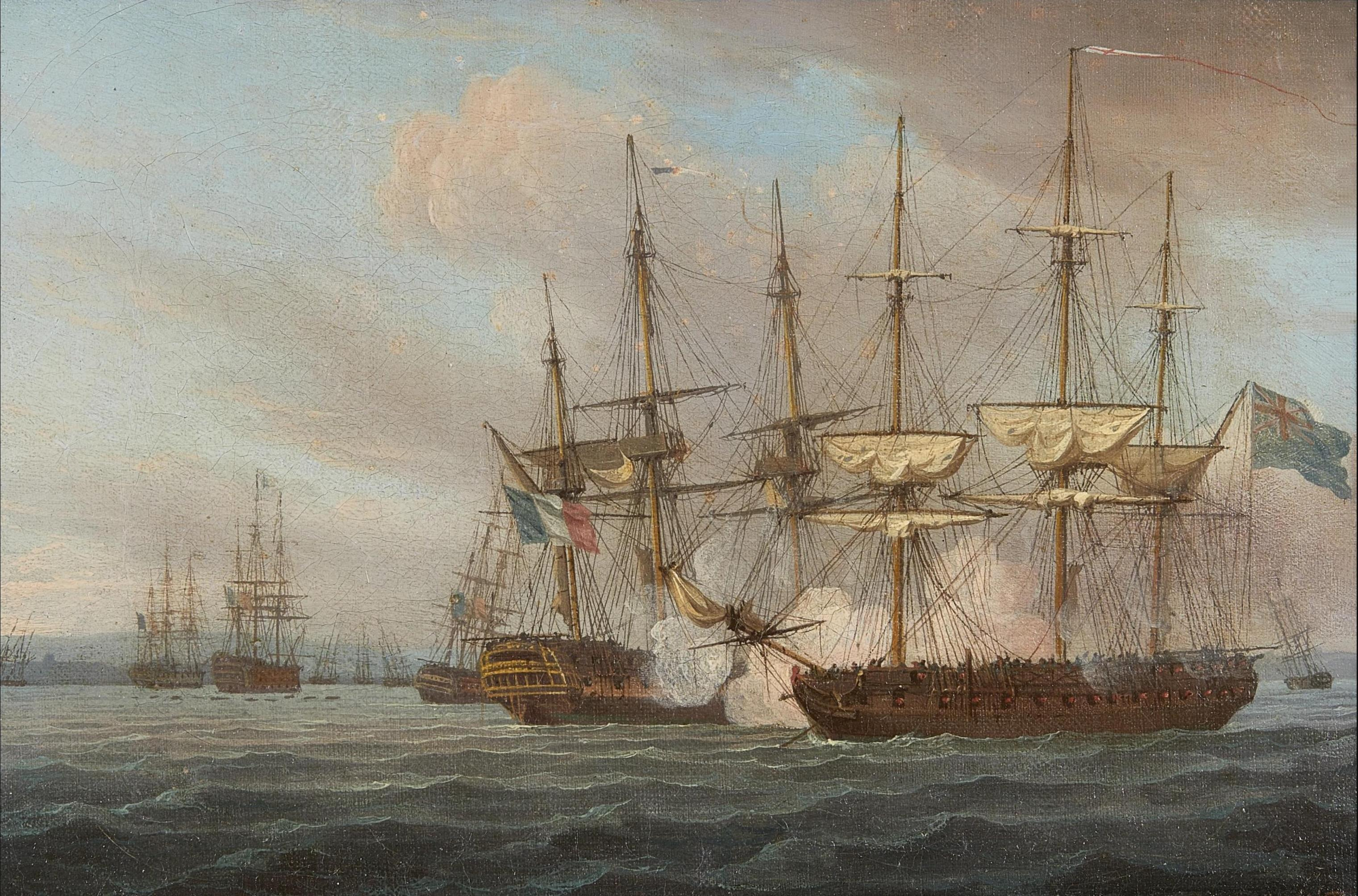
Destruction of the French Fleet in Basque Roads by Thomas Sutherland after a painting by Thomas Whitcombe, 1817. Bligh commanded HMS Valiant at the attack.

Bligh was given command of the 74-gun HMS Valiant in January 1809. Valiant was patrolling off Lorient, and Bligh temporarily took command of the 74-gun HMS Revenge and sailed her to join the squadron there. While en route he fell in with a French squadron of eight ships of the line, which followed Revenge until she was able to make contact with the British squadron under the command of Captain Sir John Beresford, causing the French to break off. Bligh then sailed with Beresford's squadron to join Admiral Lord Gambier off Basque Roads. Bligh was present during the night-attack with fireships by Lord Cochrane on the French fleet in the roads. The following morning, 12 April, Gambier sent Bligh into the harbour with HMS Valiant, HMS Revenge, HMS Bellona and several frigates and bomb vessels, and to anchor near the Île-d'Aix. Having done so Bligh asked permission to support Cochrane, which was given. He moved into the inner road and joined the attacks on the forts and several beached French warships, and having taken out the prisoners, burnt the 118-gun Ville de Varsovie and the 74-gun Aquilon. In the summer of 1809 he was called as a witness at the Court-martial of James, Lord Gambier which assessed whether Admiral Gambier had failed to support Cochrane during the battle. Gambier was controversially cleared of all charges.

=== Capture of Confiance ===
Bligh then resumed his station with the Channel Fleet, patrolling off the French ports. On 3 February 1810 he came across the French ship Confiance, a former frigate that had been purchased by the merchants of the Île de France to transport their goods back to France. At the time Bligh had been sailing in company with the 74-gun HMS Defiance, and under the orders of her captain, Henry Hotham. On 1 February Hotham had ordered Bligh to follow him into Quiberon Bay, but Valiant was unable to weather the point, nor could she make progress in the light winds the following day. She was therefore still off Belle Île on 3 February, when the Confiance came in sight. Confiance had evaded British blockaders and cruisers during the entirety of her voyage, having escaped pursuit fourteen times in her 93-day passage from the Indian Ocean. Hampered by light winds, she was unable to escape the Valiant, and finally surrendered to her just a few hours away from reaching safety in a French port. Her cargo was valued at £800,000, of which Bligh received £14,041.

== Later life and family ==
By now extremely wealthy from prize money, Bligh remained captain of Valiant until May 1810, when ill health forced his resignation. He went ashore and did not return to an active command for the remainder of the wars. He was appointed a Companion of the Bath on 4 June 1815, and was promoted to rear-admiral on 19 July 1821. He was twice married, having married his first wife, Sarah Leeke, on 31 May 1798. He remarried on 17 August 1809 at St Marylebone, uniting with Cecilia Moultrie, the daughter of the former governor of East Florida John Moultrie. Bligh made his home at Fareham in 1823, and, apparently suffering from a long-term illness he had contracted in his service in the West Indies, died at his seat of Whitedale House, Hambledon, Hampshire on 19 January 1831 at the age of sixty.

== Notes ==
a. Several sources, including John Marshall's Royal Naval Biography and James Ralfe's The Naval Biography of Great Britain give a birth month and year of August 1771. Nicholas Tracy's entry in Who's Who in Nelson's Navy uses August 1770, but goes on to incorrectly state his age of death in 1831 as sixty-nine. Bligh's obituary in The United Service Magazine notes that he was sixty at his death on 19 January 1831, ruling out his birth in August 1771.

b. While sources agree that Bligh studied at Guildford, they vary on the date of his entry to the navy. The United Service Magazine and Royal Naval Biography both use 1782, The Naval Biography of Great Britain 1783, and Who's Who in Nelson's Navy 1780. The first two omit details of his ships, while The Naval Biography of Great Britain makes reference to Trimmer as being his first ship. Tracy's biography is the more complete, giving details of his earlier ships.

c. The Naval Biography of Great Britain has a slightly different order of his ships, suggesting he was aboard Bulldog until March 1786, when the death of her captain caused him to move to Camilla. He returned to England aboard her in 1787 and then joined Pegase until she was paid off in February 1788.

d. Ralfe records that Dessalines was extremely reluctant to allow the French to evacuate, and on being presented with the British terms, requested that eight French officers be surrendered to him in exchange for his agreement. When Bligh refused, he had him arrested and threatened to shoot him, before finally having him released and allowing the evacuation to proceed. Bligh's other biographers omit this detail, but agree Dessalines was reluctant, and refused to provide pilots to guide the French out of the harbour, resulting in one of the frigates running aground for a time. Ralfe also records that having failed to get his revenge on the French squadron, Dessalines had the French soldiers who had been left in the hospital killed.

e. Curaçao remained in Dutch hands for over two years, until being captured by a force led by Captain Charles Brisbane in January 1807.
