= HMS Alexander (1778) =

Ship of the line of the Royal Navy

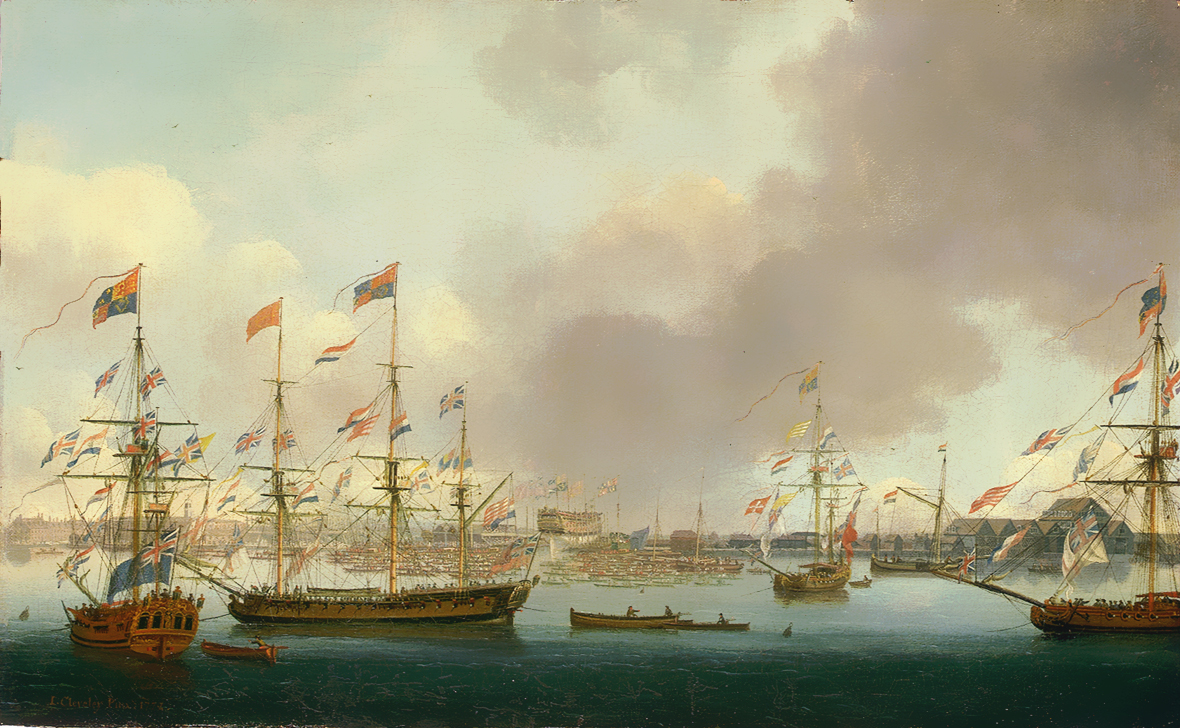
- Alexander being launched on 8 October 1778

History

Great Britain
- Name: HMS Alexander
- Ordered: 21 July 1773
- Builder: Deptford Dockyard
- Laid down: 6 April 1774
- Launched: 8 October 1778
- Captured: 6 November 1794, by French Navy

France
- Name: Alexandre
- Acquired: 6 November 1794
- Captured: 22 June 1795, by Royal Navy

Great Britain
- Name: HMS Alexander
- Acquired: 22 June 1795
- Honours and awards: Participated in Battle of the Nile; Naval General Service Medal with clasp "Egypt"
- Fate: Broken up, 1819

General characteristics
- Class & type: Alfred-class ship of the line
- Type: Third rate
- Tons burthen: 1621 (bm)
- Length: 169 ft (52 m) (gundeck)
- Beam: 47 ft 2 in (14.38 m)
- Depth of hold: 20 ft (6.1 m)
- Propulsion: Sails
- Sail plan: Full-rigged ship
- Armament: 74 guns: Gundeck: 28 × 32-pounder guns; Upper gundeck: 28 × 18-pounder guns; Quarterdeck: 14 × 9-pounder guns; Forecastle: 4 × 9-pounder guns

HMS Alexander was a 74-gun third-rate ship of the line of the Royal Navy. She was launched at Deptford Dockyard on 8 October 1778. During her career she was captured by the French, and later recaptured by the British. She fought at the Nile in 1798, and was broken up in 1819. She was named after Alexander the Great.

== British service and capture ==
On 13 March 1780, Alexander and HMS Courageaux captured the 40-gun French privateer Monsieur after a long chase and some exchange of fire. The Royal Navy took the privateer into service as HMS Monsieur.

In 1794, whilst returning to England in the company of HMS Canada after escorting a convoy to Spain, Alexander, under the command of Rear-Admiral Richard Rodney Bligh, fell in with a French squadron of five 74-gun ships, and three frigates, led by Joseph-Marie Nielly. In the action of 6 November 1794 Alexander was overrun by the Droits de l'Homme, but escaped when she damaged the Droits de l'Homme's rigging. Alexander was then caught by Marat, which came behind her stern and raked her. Then, the 74 gun third-rate Jean Bart closed in and fired broadsides at close range, forcing Bligh to surrender Alexander. In the meantime, Canada escaped. The subsequent court martial honourably acquitted Bligh of any blame for the loss of his ship.

The French took her to Brest and then into their French Navy under the name Alexandre. On 22 June 1795, she was with a French fleet off Belle Île when the Channel Fleet under Lord Bridport discovered them. The British ships chased the French fleet, and brought them to action in the Battle of Groix. During the battle HMS Sans Pareil and HMS Colossus recaptured Alexander. After the battle, HMS Révolutionnaire towed her back to Plymouth.

== Return to British service ==
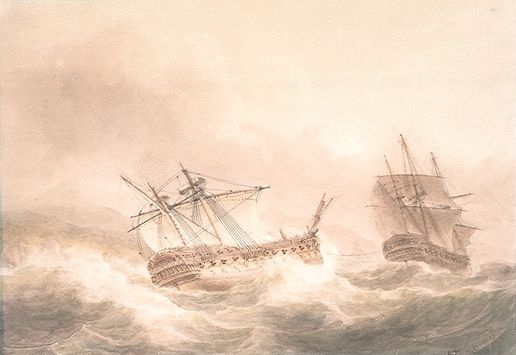
Alexander towing Vanguard, May 1798

In 1798 Nelson was detached into the Mediterranean by Earl St. Vincent with HMS Orion, Alexander, Emerald, Terpsichore, and Bonne Citoyenne. They sailed from Gibraltar on 9 May and on 12 May were struck by a violent gale in the Gulf of Lion that carried away Vanguard's topmasts and foremast. The squadron bore up for Sardinia, Alexander taking Vanguard in tow.

The Alexander took part in the Battle of the Nile in 1798, under the command of Captain Alexander Ball. On the evening of 1 August 1798, half an hour before sunset, the battle began. She was the second ship to fire upon the French fleet, engaging the flagship, L'Orient. The Alexander sank three French ships before she had to withdraw due to a small fire on board. The Alexander was one of the few ships not carrying a detachment of soldiers.

Northumberland, Alexander, Penelope, Bonne Citoyenne, and the brig Vincejo shared in the proceeds of the French polacca Vengeance, captured entering Valletta, Malta on 6 August.

Alexander served in the navy's Egyptian campaign between 8 March 1801 and 2 September, which qualified her officers and crew for the clasp "Egypt" to the Naval General Service Medal that the Admiralty issued in 1847 to all surviving claimants.

== Fate ==
From 1803 she was out of commission in Plymouth, and was finally broken up in 1819.

== See also ==
- List of ships captured in the 18th century
