= Action of 6 November 1794 =

1794 battle of the War of the First Coalition

- Part of the War of the First Coalition
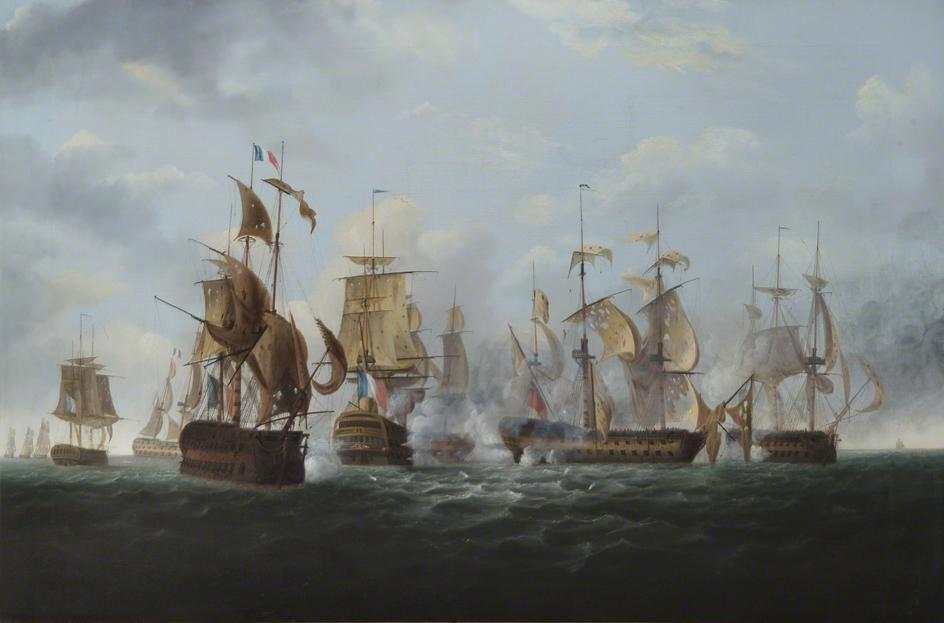
- HMS Alexander, Shortly before Striking Her Colours to the French Squadron, 6 November 1794; William Shayer, 1819
Date	6 November 1794
Location	Celtic Sea, Atlantic Ocean 48°25′00″N 07°53′00″W
Result	French victory

Belligerents
France	Great Britain

Commanders and leaders
Joseph-Marie Nielly	Richard Rodney Bligh; Charles Powell Hamilton

Strength
5 ships of the line 3 frigates 1 corvette	2 ships of the line

Casualties and losses
10 wounded	28 killed 30 wounded 1 ship of the line captured

The action of 6 November 1794 (Known in French as the Combat du 16 Brumaire an III) was a naval engagement during the War of the First Coalition. Two Royal Navy ships of the line, HMS Alexander and HMS Canada were intercepted while returning to Britain through the Celtic Sea by a large French squadron. The French squadron had sailed from Brest, France in search of an inward bound British convoy in October, but instead encountered the two British ships returning from escorting an outward-bound convoy. There had been no warning of the French approach as the British force assigned to watch Brest was absent at Plymouth due to the policy of operating a distant blockade.

The British ships separated and attempted to escape, but the French commander Contre-amiral Joseph-Marie Nielly simply split his forces in response and, although Canada was eventually able to outrun pursuit, Alexander was slower and was caught by several French ships in succession. The first two opponents were driven off, but the third succeeded in coming alongside and, in a fierce and close fought duel, compelled Captain Richard Rodney Bligh to surrender his ship in the face of overwhelming odds. The battle was a rare French victory, lying between the significant British victories at the Glorious First of June and the Battle of Groix, in the Royal Navy campaign against the French fleet at Brest.

== Background ==
In February 1793, following years of rising tension, the French Republic that had emerged from the French Revolution declared war on the Kingdom of Great Britain. For the Royal Navy one of the most immediate concerns was to contain the French Atlantic Fleet based in the massively fortified harbour at Brest in Brittany. This port was ideally positioned to disrupt the merchant shipping convoys that passed through the Celtic Sea and the Bay of Biscay en route to Britain from all over the world, and it was therefore imperative that the French fleet was not permitted to put to sea without being challenged. For the French, Brest was a vital port for the receipt of grain supplies from the Americas and so French fleets regularly sailed on missions to escort these convoys into the harbour and to disrupt British convoys entering the English Channel.

In May 1794, a large French fleet put to sea to ensure the safety of an American grain convoy and was intercepted far out in the Atlantic at the Glorious First of June by the British Channel Fleet, the most powerful of the Royal Navy's fleets and the force assigned to restrict French movements from Brest. The French suffered a serious defeat, losing seven ships, but managed to retire in good order and saved the grain convoy. Later in June 1794 the British Fleet again put to sea, but was caught in a storm and many ships were badly damaged. Its commander Lord Howe retired with his fleet to the anchorage in Torbay and thus there was no British fleet at sea in late October when a powerful French squadron sailed from Brest with the intention of attacking a large merchant convoy sailing from Lisbon to Britain. The force, under the command of Contre-amiral Joseph-Marie Nielly, consisted of the 74-gun ships of the line Marat, Tigre, Droits de l'Homme, Pelletier and Jean Bart with the frigates Charente, Fraternité, Gentille and the corvette Papillon.

In addition to the Lisbon convoy, a number of other vulnerable British targets were in the region, including a second convoy from the Mediterranean Sea under Rear-Admiral Philip Cosby en route to Britain and the first-rate HMS Victory, which was sailing independently with Lord Hood on board. Nielly had information concerning these movements, and was cruising in a pattern that was intended to cover the Western approaches to the English Channel. The French force cruised in the Celtic Sea for several days, until on 6 November at 02:30 two unidentified ships were spotted on the northeastern horizon. These vessels were the British 74-gun ships of the line HMS Alexander under Captain Richard Rodney Bligh and HMS Canada under Captain Charles Powell Hamilton, returning northeastwards to rejoin the Channel Fleet after escorting a Lisbon and Mediterranean bound convoy to a safe latitude.

== Chase ==
On sighting the French force, the British captains first sought to establish the identity of the strange ships, shortening sail and tacking to port so that they could close with the squadron. At 04:00 they were about 0.5 nautical miles (0.93 km; 0.58 mi) away, ordering their crews to set more sail, ready to attempt to escape should the squadron be revealed to be French. At 05:00, lookouts on the British ships discovered that the squadron, which had favourable wind, was approaching fast and this convinced Bligh and Hamilton that the unidentified ships were hostile. Bligh ordered Hamilton to separate in the hope that he could escape without the slower Alexander, Hamilton adjusting his course to a more northerly direction. Nielly had deliberately sought to disguise his squadron's nationality in an effort to lure the British close enough that he could catch and overwhelm them, the trap springing successfully as three ships of the line pursued Alexander while two ships of the line, including Nielly's flagship, and two frigates followed Canada. To continue the deception, Nielly ordered his ships to raise the Union Flag at 07:30, to which the British ships replied at 08:15 by raising their own, having shifted their direction of flight to the eastwards to make better use of the available wind.

The raising of the British flags on Alexander and Canada was a clear indicator to Nielly that the British were aware of his identity, and he instead ordered his squadron to hoist the French tricolour, finally abandoning the ruse that his ships were British. During the preceding three hours, the division of the French squadron in pursuit of Alexander had steadily closed the gap between the ships, Alexander responding by firing stern-chasers at the pursuers. The French ships responded by firing their bow-chasers at the British vessel. At 09:00 Canada too came in range, Nielly ordering his flagship Marat to fire on the Hamilton's ship, the shot flying over the vessel and harmlessly into the sea. Hamilton responded with fire from his own stern-chasers and Bligh issued signals for Alexander and Canada to form a line, Canada in the lead, so that the British vessels might mutually support one another.

Nielly recognised Bligh's intentions as soon as Canada began to move however, and interposed his division so that they blocked Hamilton's manoeuvre, both ships of the division now firing on Hamilton's ship. Bligh was thus isolated, Alexander falling further behind Canada. At 11:00, the French ship Jean Bart was able to draw close enough to Alexander to discharge its main broadside at the British vessel, the two ships engaging in a fierce duel for 30 minutes, both suffering damage. At 11:30 Jean Bart sheered away from the engagement, assisted by a French frigate, and its place was taken by the next French ship in line, Tigre. Tigre could not pull directly alongside Bligh's ship, but was still able to attack the British ship with heavy fire, receiving a battering in turn that shot away the French ship's main and mizen topmasts and inflicted severe damage to its rigging.

Tigre too turned away at about 12:00 and was again replaced by the third ship in the French line, Marat, which pulled alongside and battered the already damaged Alexander for an hour, taking damage in its turn. At 13:00, with his rigging and sails tattered, his masts shot through, hull shattered and several fires raging on board, Bligh surrendered Alexander in the face of overwhelming French odds as Nielly's division pulled within range and began to fire on his ship. Hamilton in Canada had been able to pull ahead of Nielly and escape, most of the French shot flying over the British ship: so ineffectual had been the attack on Canada that Hamilton reported no damage or casualties at all.

== Aftermath ==
Consolidating his battered prize, Nielly ordered his squadron to return to Brest without waiting for the British convoys that had been his intended targets: unknown to the French, both the Lisbon and Mediterranean convoys were less than 180 nautical miles (330 km; 210 mi) away from the action. Alexander was in a sinking condition, and it was only with difficulty that the ship was brought back to port afloat. The captured crew were distributed among the French squadron and as a result Bligh was unable to make a full casualty list. He later estimated losses of approximately 40 men killed or wounded aboard Alexander, although French accounts give 28 killed and 30 wounded. British histories reported French casualties in the engagement as the enormous figure of 450 men killed and wounded, although as French historian Charles Rouvier noted in 1868, this is an absurdly inflated total: Rouvier gave French losses as 10 wounded, all on Marat. Bligh was returned to Brest in the custody of Captain Jean François Renaudin, who had commanded the ship Vengeur du Peuple at the Glorious First of June until his ship was sunk. Bligh, who had, unknown to him, been promoted to rear-admiral whilst at sea, later commended Renaudin for his conduct while Bligh was a prisoner and wrote to the Admiralty that he had been treated with "great Kindness and Humanity". However, historian Edward Pelham Brenton reported in 1825 that at Brest:

"the populace insulted the prisoners as they marched to their place of confinement: officers and men shared the same lot; they were denied the commonest rations of provisions, and reduced to starvation. A wretched dog that crept into the cells was killed, and his head alone sold for a dollar, to satisfy the cravings of nature: a prisoner, in a state of delirium, threw himself in the well within the prison walls, and his dead body, after lying some time, was taken out, but no other water was allowed to the people to drink."

— "the officers who were present", quoted in Edward Pelham Brenton, The Naval History of Great Britain, Volume 1, 1825,

Bligh was exchanged shortly after the action and returned to Britain. On 27 May 1795 he sat before a court-martial, standard practice when a Royal Navy ship was lost in action, and was honourably acquitted of blame in the loss of Alexander. In France, the National Convention commended Nielly on his victory and the captured ship was repaired and taken into the French Navy, joining the Atlantic Fleet. It was however a poor sailor and in June 1795 was with the French fleet that participated in Cornwallis's Retreat and the Battle of Groix: at the latter action Alexandre was overrun by the British fleet and recaptured, rejoining the Royal Navy. The historical assessment of the capture of Alexander has been summed up by the historian Robert Gardiner, who wrote in 1996 that "The capture of a British 74 was a rare event during these wars – only five were lost . . . However, the one sided nature of the conflict was not apparent in 1794 and what has been called the Royal Navy's 'habit of victory' was not yet established."

== Bibliography ==
- Brenton, Edward Pelham (1837) [1825]. The Naval History of Great Britain, Vol. I. London: C. Rice. "edward pelham brenton."
- Clowes, William Laird (1997) [1900]. The Royal Navy, A History from the Earliest Times to 1900, Volume IV. London: Chatham Publishing. ISBN 1-86176-013-2.
- Gardiner, Robert, ed. (2001) [1996]. Fleet Battle and Blockade. Caxton Editions. ISBN 9781840673630.
- James, William (2002) [1827]. The Naval History of Great Britain, Volume 1, 1793–1796. London: Conway Maritime Press. ISBN 0-85177-905-0.
- Rouvier, Charles (1868). "Crosière en Manche". Histoire des marins français sous la République, de 1789 à 1803. Paris: Librairie Maritime at Scientifique. p. 205. "Combat de Groix."
- Tracy, Nicholas, ed. (1998). "Capture of the Alexander". The Naval Chronicle, Volume 1, 1793–1798. Chatham Publishing. ISBN 1-86176-091-4.
- Woodman, Richard (2001). The Sea Warriors. Constable Publishers. ISBN 1-84119-183-3.
