= Charles Iain Hamilton =

Naval historian

Charles Iain Hamilton is a naval historian at the University of the Witwatersrand, Johannesburg, South Africa.

== Early life ==
Hamilton took a BA at Keele University and a PhD at Queens' College, Cambridge in 1974 with a thesis on “The Royal Navy, Seapower, and the Screwship of the Line, 1845-1860”.

== Academic career ==
He joined the University of the Witwatersrand, Johannesburg, in 1982 as a lecturer in history and was promoted to associate professor. His particular research interests are in the British and French navies of the nineteenth century, naval administration, and the links between signals intelligence and naval operations during the Second World War.

== Publications ==
  - Books
- Anglo-French naval rivalry, 1840-1870 (Oxford : Clarendon Press, 1993).
- The Making of the Modern Admiralty: British Naval policy-making 1805-1927 (Cambridge: Cambridge University Press, 2011).
  - Edited Documents
- "Selections from the Phinn Committee of Inquiry of October–November 1853 into the State of the Office of Secretary to the Admiralty, in The Naval Miscellany, volume V, edited by N. A. M. Rodger, (London: Navy Records Society, London, 1984).
- Portsmouth Dockyard Papers, 1852-1869: From Wood to Iron, a Calendar, compiled by C.I. Hamilton. (Winchester, Hampshire: Hampshire County Council, 2005).
  - Selected Journal Articles
- "Seamen and Crime at the Cape, c.1860-1880", International Journal of Maritime History, vol. 2, no. 1, (1989).
- "The Childers Admiralty Reforms and the Nineteenth Century 'Revolution' in British Government", War in History, vol. 5, no. 1, (1998), pp. 37–61.
- "John Wilson Croker: patronage and clientage at the Admiralty, 1809-1857", Historical Journal, vol. 43, no. 1, (2000).
- “Expanding Naval Powers: Admiralty Private Secretaries and Private Offices, 1800–1945.” War in History, Vol.10, no. 2 (2003), pp. 125–156
- “The Character and Organization of the Admiralty Operational Intelligence Centre during the Second World War.” War in History, Vol.7, no.3, (2000), pp. 295–324.
- “British Naval Policy, Policy-Makers and Financial Control, 1860–1945,” War in History, Vol.12, no. 4, (2005), pp. 371–395

== External sources ==
•Biography on the University of Witwatersrand website
