= Charles Bailey =

Charles Bailey may refer to:

- Charles Bailey (medium) (1870–1947), Australian apport medium
- Charles G. Bailey, faculty manager of WMUL, Marshall University
- Charles Justin Bailey (1859–1946), American soldier
- Charles P. Bailey (pilot) (1918–2001), one of the Tuskegee Airmen's most decorated combat fighter pilots
- Charles P. Bailey (surgeon) (1910–1993), American pioneer in heart surgery
- Charles R. Bailey, American Army chaplain
- Charles W. Bailey II (1929–2012), American journalist, newspaper editor and novelist
- Charlie Bailey (American football) (born 1940), American football coach
- Charlie Bailey (footballer) (born 1997), English footballer

== See also ==
- Charles Baily (1815–1878), English architect and archaeologist
- Charles Bayly (disambiguation)
- Charles Baillie (disambiguation)
- Charlie Collins (musician), née Charlene Bailey, Australian musician
