= Charles S. Hamilton (philatelist) =

American philatelist

Col. Charles S. Hamilton
- Born: May 27, 1882
- Died: June 27, 1968 (aged 86)
- Engineering career
- Projects: Expert of postage stamps of Mexico; collected and authored articles on Mexican stamps
- Awards: APS Hall of Fame

Col. Charles S. Hamilton (May 27, 1882 – June 27, 1968), of Washington, D.C., was noted philatelist who served in the United States Army during the Mexican Revolution.

== Military career ==
Hamilton served in the United States Army. He was stationed in the United States Army Quartermaster Corps along the Mexican border from 1913 to 1914. He also served with General John J. Pershing during Pershing's expedition into Mexico during 1915 and 1916.

== Collecting interests ==
Hamilton became interested in Mexican postage stamps and postal history while serving in Mexico. While in Mexico, he obtained first hand information on Mexican postage stamp issues, and became an expert on stamps of Sonora and those that were issued by various postal authorities during the Mexican Revolution. The colonel's Mexican collections were considered world class, and he exhibited portions of the collections at shows and exhibitions.

== Philatelic literature ==
Hamilton wrote extensively of his studies of Mexican stamps, particularly those of the Mexican Civil War era.

== Honors and awards ==
Colonel Hamilton was named to the Mexico-Elmhurst Philatelic Society International Hall of Fame in 1965. In 1969 he was named to the American Philatelic Society Hall of Fame.

== See also ==
- Postage stamps and postal history of Mexico
- Philatelic literature
