= Joseph-Marie Nielly =

French naval officer (1751–1833)

- Born: 1751; Brest, Kingdom of France
- Died: 1833 (aged 81–82); Brest, July Monarchy
- Allegiance: Kingdom of France (until 1792) French First Republic First French Empire
- Branch: French Navy
- Battles / wars: Seven Years' War; Battle of Quiberon Bay; American Revolutionary War; Naval battles of the American Revolutionary War; French Revolutionary Wars; War of the First Coalition; Action of 6 November 1794

Joseph-Marie Nielly (French pronunciation: [ʒozɛf maʁi njeli]; 1751 – 1833) was a French naval officer and admiral.

Nielly was born and died in Brest. He began his career aged seven aboard the Formidable, and was wounded at the Battle of Quiberon Bay, on 20 November 1759. He sailed in the Caribbean until 1769, when he joined the merchant navy.

In 1774, aged 23, he received his first command of a merchantman. In 1778, he joined the French Navy as lieutenant de frégate. During the Naval operations in the American Revolutionary War, he commanded the 20-gun Guyane, escorting convoys. On 17 August 1778, she fought against two ships of the line, two frigates and one cutter, yet managed to escaped.

After war ended, he sailed again as a merchant, and joined the Navy again in 1787 after a reform of the status of officers from the ranks and files, as a sous-lieutenant de vaisseau. In 1789 and 1790, and commanded the cutter Pilote des Indes, escorting the fishing fleet from Granville. He later served on the fluyt Dromadaire as first mate, and as commanded between May and December 1791, replenishing outposts in the Carebeans.

In January 1792, he was promoted the full lieutenant de vaisseau, and to capitaine de vaisseau in January 1793. When the War of the First Coalition broke out, he took command of the frigate Résolue and raided commerce in the Atlantic, in the Bay of Biscay, and the Channel, both alone and within the frigate division commanded by Zacharie Allemand.

A resolute Republican, Nielly had his crew sign a manifesto supporting the Constitution of the French First Republic, and sent it to the National Convention. In November 1793, he was promoted to contre-amiral.

In April 1794, in the context of the Atlantic campaign of May 1794, he set his mark on the Sans Pareil and led a 5-ship and 2-frigate strong squadron to meet with the convoy led by Van Stabel. He failed to meet the convoy, but on 8 May, the squadron met and captured HMS Castor, as well as 30 merchantmen that she escorted . The frigate Unité also captured the 16-gun sloop HMS Alert. He met with Villaret-Joyeuse's fleet. At the Bataille du 13 prairial an 2, Nielly commanded the rear with his mark set on Républicain.

At the action of 6 November 1794, Nielly's division captured HMS Alexander.

Nielly was put in charge of the third squadron of the Brest fleet, and took part in the Croisière du Grand Hiver, under Villaret-Joyeuse, and in the Expédition d'Irlande, under Morard de Galles, with his mark on the frigate Résolue . The fleet was dispersed in tempests which destroyed the Séduisant and the frigate Surveillante

He reached Bantry Bay, where the Redoutable accidentally collided with the Résolue, destroying her bowsprit, foremast, mainmast and mizzen. A shore party was sent on a small boat, and was captured by the British. Without hope of landing an army in condition to fight, the French fleet returned to Brest.

Nielly later held the office positions of commandant d’armes in Brest and Lorient, and Préfet maritime in Dunkirk from 1800. Having bad personal relations to Denis Decrès, he resigned in 1803 and retired. In 1814, he was made Baron d'Empire, and died in 1833 with the dignity of honorary vice-admiral.

== Honours ==
Nielly's name is engraved on the Arc de Triomphe.

== Sources ==
- Six, Georges (1934). "Nielly (Joseph-Marie)". Dictionnaire biographique des généraux et amiraux français de la Révolution et de l'Empire: 1792–1814 (in French). Vol. 2. Paris: Librairie Historique et Nobilaire. pp. 256–257.
- Bordonove, Georges (1974). Les Marins de l'An II. Robert Laffont. ISBN 2221016092.
- Thomazi, Auguste (1978). Les Marins de Napoléon. Paris: Tallandier.
