= HMS Agincourt (1796) =

Ship of the line of the Royal Navy

- Plan of Agincourt

History

Great Britain
- Name: HMS Agincourt
- Namesake: Battle of Agincourt
- Builder: Perry, Blackwall Yard
- Launched: 23 July 1796
- Christened: Earl Talbot
- Decommissioned: 1809
- Renamed: 1796:HMS Agincourt; 1812:HMS Bristol
- Honours and awards: Naval General Service Medal with clasp "Egypt"
- Fate: Sold, 1814

General characteristics
- Class & type: 64-gun third rate ship of the line
- Tons burthen: 1439, or 1416 (bm)
- Length: 172 ft 8 in (52.63 m) (gundeck)
- Beam: 43 ft 4 in (13.21 m)
- Depth of hold: 19 ft 9 in (6.02 m)
- Propulsion: Sails
- Sail plan: Full-rigged ship
- Armament: 64 guns of various weights of shot

HMS Agincourt was a 64-gun third-rate ship of the line of the Royal Navy, launched on 23 July 1796 at Blackwall Yard, London. The Admiralty bought her on the stocks from the East India Company in 1796, who had called her Earl Talbot.

Agincourt served in the navy's Egyptian campaign between 8 March 1801 and 2 September, which qualified her officers and crew for the clasp "Egypt" to the Naval General Service Medal that the Admiralty authorized in 1850 to all surviving claimants. (Note: A first-class share of the prize money awarded in April 1823 was worth £34 2s 4d; a fifth-class share, that of a seaman, was worth 3s 11½d. The amount was small as the total had to be shared between 79 vessels and the entire army contingent.)

She was at Gibraltar 7 November 1803.

She and HMS Argo arrived at Malta from Egypt 15 March 1804 under command of Capt. Thomas Briggs.

She was decommissioned in 1809 and converted to a troop ship on 6 January 1812 under the name HMS Bristol.

== Fate ==
Bristol was sold on 15 December 1814 on condition that she be broken up immediately. She sold for £4,510.
