= Charlie Bailey (footballer) =

English footballer

Personal information
- Full name: Charlie Ellis Bailey
- Date of birth: 12 June 1997 (age 29)
- Place of birth: Lancaster, England
- Height: 1.78 m (5 ft 10 in)
- Position: Midfielder

Team information
- Current team: Lancaster City

Youth career
- –2015: Morecambe

Senior career*
Years	Team	Apps	(Gls)
2015–2016	Morecambe	0	(0)
2015–2016	→ Kendal Town (loan)	?	(?)
2016–2017	Kendal Town	?	(?)
2017– date	Lancaster City	74	(13)
- * Club domestic league appearances and goals as of the end of the 2018–19 season

Charlie Ellis Bailey (born 12 June 1997) is an English footballer who plays as a midfielder for Lancaster City.

== Career ==
A former pupil at Central Lancaster High School, Bailey joined Morecambe's youth ranks aged 13, and captained their reserve team before signing his first professional contract on 12 May 2015. He was first included in a matchday squad on 22 August of that year, when he was an unused substitute in the Shrimps' 3–3 League Two draw away to Portsmouth. Bailey made his debut on 1 September in a 2–0 win over Walsall in the Football League Trophy first round at the Globe Arena, replacing Alex Kenyon for the final 18 minutes.

After his release from Morecambe and having spent the second half of the 2015–16 season on loan at Kendal Town he signed permanently for the Mintcakes for the 2016–17 season. He subsequently joined hometown club Lancaster City for the 2017–18 season, along with his older brother Sam.
