= HMS Canada (1765) =

Ship of the line of the Royal Navy

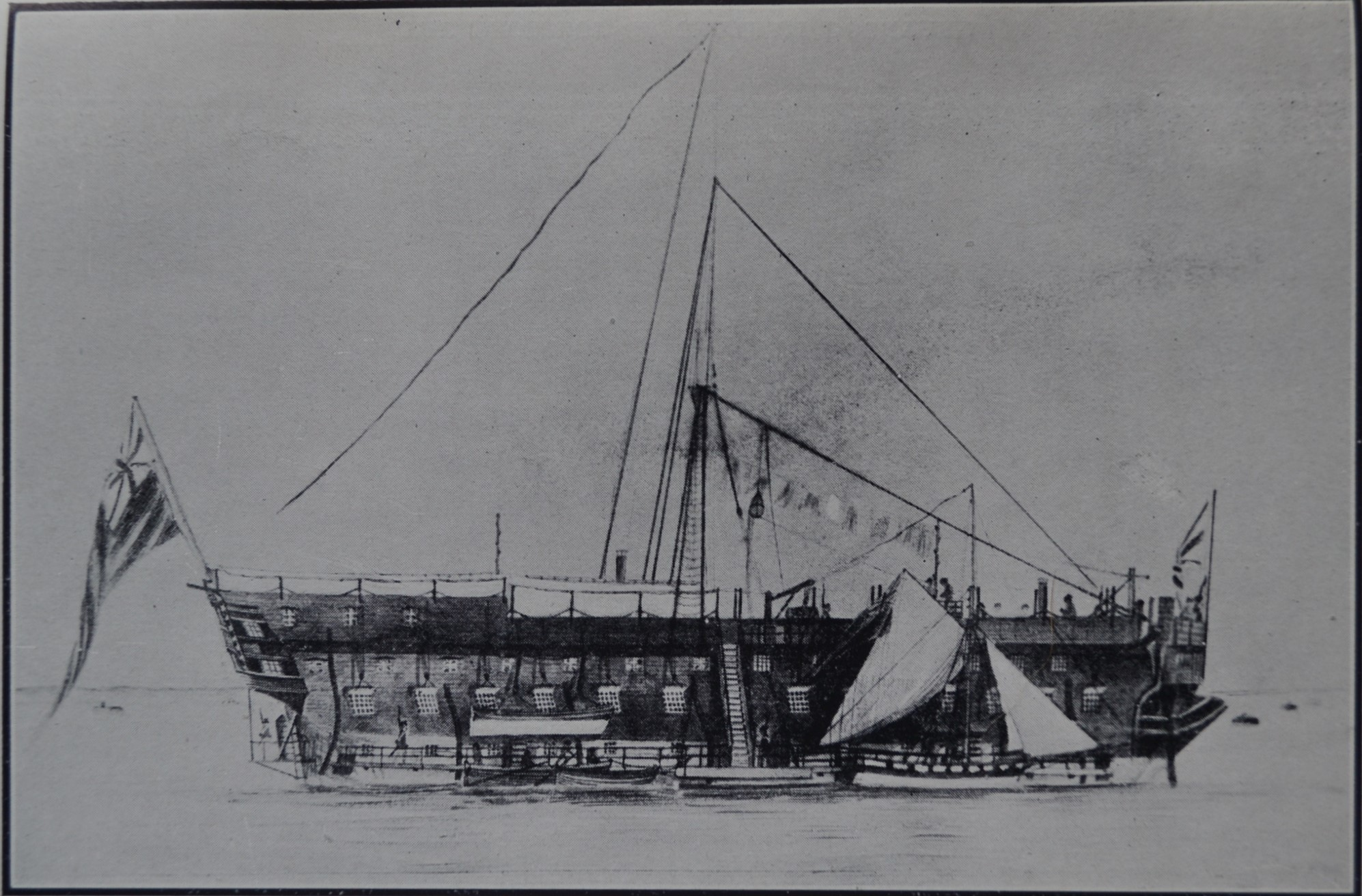
- Illustration of Canada in 1811

History

Great Britain
- Name: HMS Canada
- Ordered: 1 December 1759
- Builder: Woolwich Dockyard
- Launched: 17 September 1765
- Honours and awards: Participated in: Battle of St. Kitts; Battle of the Saintes
- Fate: Broken up, 1834
- Notes: Prison ship from 1810

General characteristics
- Class & type: Canada-class ship of the line
- Tons burthen: 1605 (bm)
- Length: 170 ft (52 m) (gundeck)
- Beam: 46 ft 9 in (14.25 m)
- Depth of hold: 20 ft 6 in (6.25 m)
- Propulsion: Sails
- Sail plan: Full-rigged ship
- Armament: Gundeck: 28 × 32-pounder guns; Upper gundeck: 28 × 18-pounder guns; QD: 14 × 9-pounder guns; Fc: 4 × 9-pounder guns

HMS Canada was a 74-gun third-rate ship of the line of the Royal Navy, launched on 17 September 1765 at Woolwich Dockyard. On 2 May 1781, Canada engaged and captured the Spanish ship Santa Leocadia, of 34 guns. In 1782, Canada was under the command of William Cornwallis, when she took part in the Battle of St. Kitts. Later that year she participated in the Battle of the Saintes. She took part in the action of 6 November 1794 under Charles Powell Hamilton and managed to avoid capture.

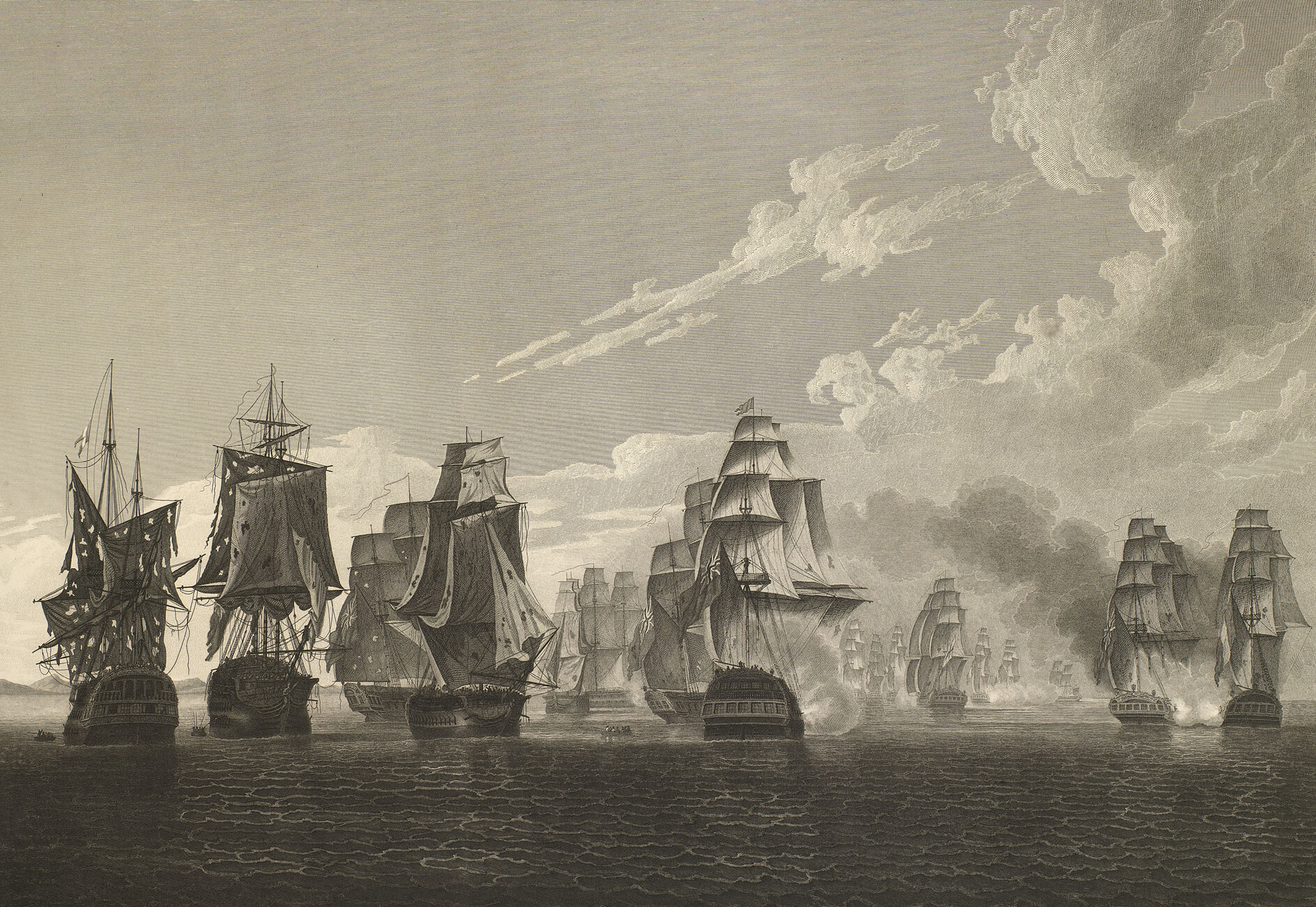
Canada at the Battle of Tory Island

In 1807, Canada was in the Caribbean in a squadron under the command of Rear-Admiral Alexander Cochrane. The squadron, which included HMS Prince George, HMS Northumberland, HMS Ramillies and HMS Cerberus, captured Telemaco, Carvalho and Master on 17 April 1807. Following concern in Britain that Denmark–Norway was allying Napoleon, in December 1807 Canada sailed in Cochrane's squadron in the expedition to occupy the Danish West Indies. The expedition bloodlessly captured Saint Thomas on 22 December and Saint Croix on 25 December. Canada became a prison ship from 1810, and was broken up in 1834.
