= HMS Prince George (1772) =

Second-rate ship of the line of the Royal Navy

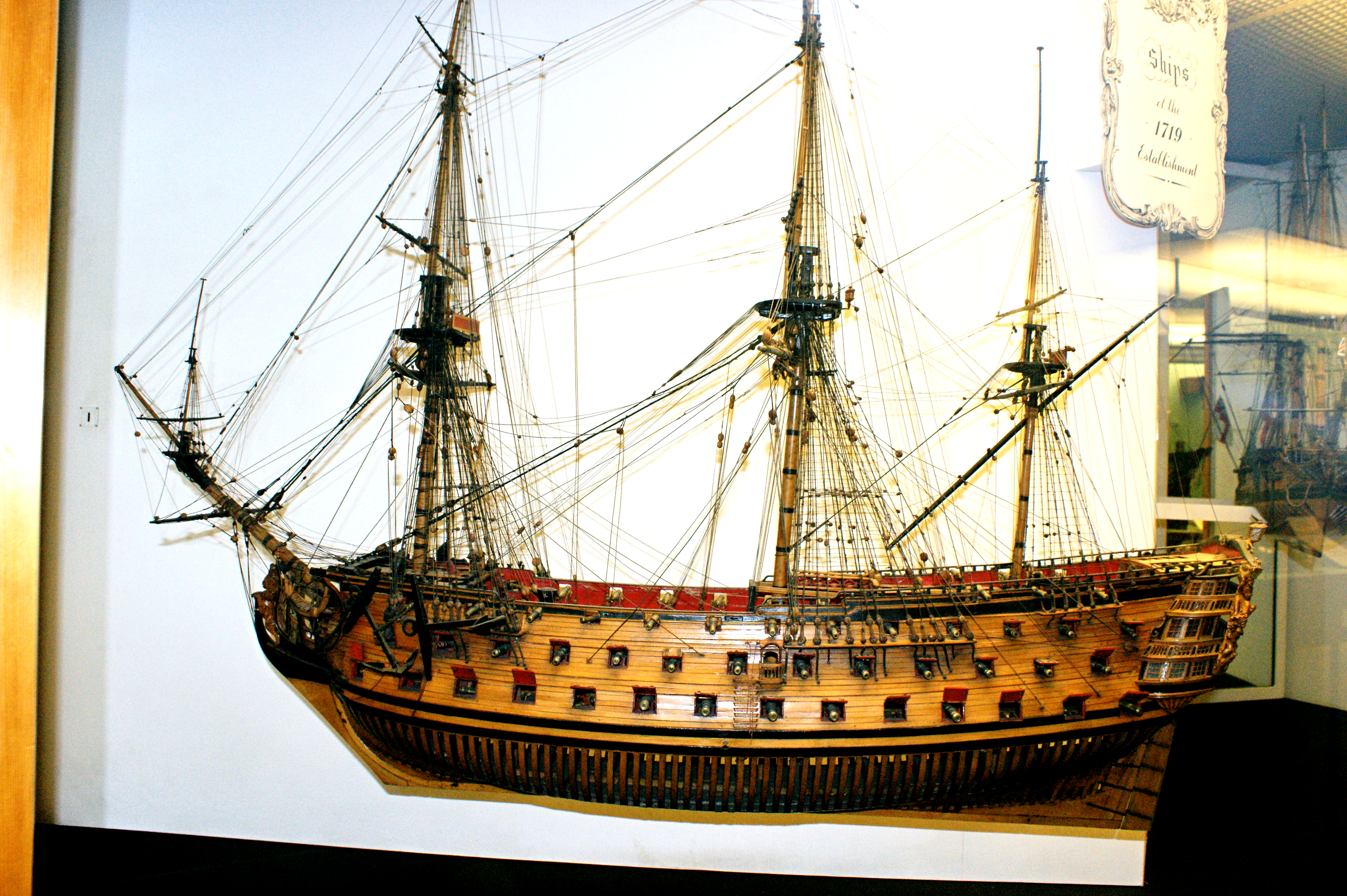
- Ship model of Prince George

History

Great Britain
- Name: HMS Prince George
- Ordered: 11 June 1766
- Builder: Chatham Dockyard
- Laid down: 18 May 1767
- Launched: 31 August 1772
- Honours and awards: Participated in: Battle of Cape St. Vincent (1780); Battle of the Saintes; Battle of Groix
- Fate: Broken up, 1839

General characteristics
- Class & type: Barfleur-class ship of the line
- Tons burthen: 1955 (bm)
- Length: 177 ft 6 in (54.10 m) (gundeck)
- Beam: 50 ft 3 in (15.32 m)
- Depth of hold: 21 ft (6.4 m)
- Propulsion: Sails
- Sail plan: Full-rigged ship
- Complement: 750 officers and men
- Armament: 90 guns: Gundeck: 28 × 32-pounder (14,528 g, 32.029 lb) guns; Middle gundeck: 30 × 18-pounder (8,172 g, 18.016 lb) guns; Upper gundeck: 30 × 12-pounder (5,448 g, 12.011 lb) guns; Fc: 2 × 9-pounder (4,086 g, 9.008 lb) guns; 98 guns: Gundeck: 28 × 32-pounder (14,528 g, 32.029 lb) guns; Middle gundeck: 30 × 18-pounder (8,172 g, 18.016 lb) guns; Upper gundeck: 30 × 12-pounder (5,448 g, 12.011 lb) guns; QD: 8 × 12-pounder (5,448 g, 12.011 lb) guns; Fc: 2 × 9-pounder (4,086 g, 9.008 lb) guns

HMS Prince George was a 90-gun second-rate ship of the line of the Royal Navy, launched on 31 August 1772 at Chatham. During her career, she was upgraded to a 98-gun ship, through the addition of eight 12-pounder (5,448 g, 12.011 lb) guns to her quarterdeck.

== Service ==
In 1780, Prince George was part of Rodney's fleet at the Battle of Cape St. Vincent. On 12 April 1782 she was seventh in line in the attack on the French fleet at the Battle of the Saintes under the command of Captain Williams. In December 1796, Sir William Parker took command of her on assignment to the Channel Fleet under Lord Bridport. On 19 January 1797 the ship was detached with several ships to join the forces of Sir John Jervis in the Mediterranean Sea. The ship then took part under in the Battle of Cape St Vincent in 1797.

She fought at the Battle of Groix in 1795. In 1807, Prince George, under Captain Woodley Losack, was in the West Indies in the squadron under the command of Rear-Admiral Alexander Cochrane. The squadron captured the Telemaco, Carvalho and Master on 17 April 1807. In December Prince George participated in Cochrane's expedition that captured the Danish islands of St Thomas on 22 December and Santa Cruz on 25 December. The Danes did not resist and the invasion was bloodless.

== Fate ==
Prince George was converted to serve as a sheer hulk in 1832. In 1835 she was used in a series of gunnery trials as a target ship, the results of which contributed to the rapid introduction of the shell firing gun. The Prince George was broken up in 1839.

== Gallery ==
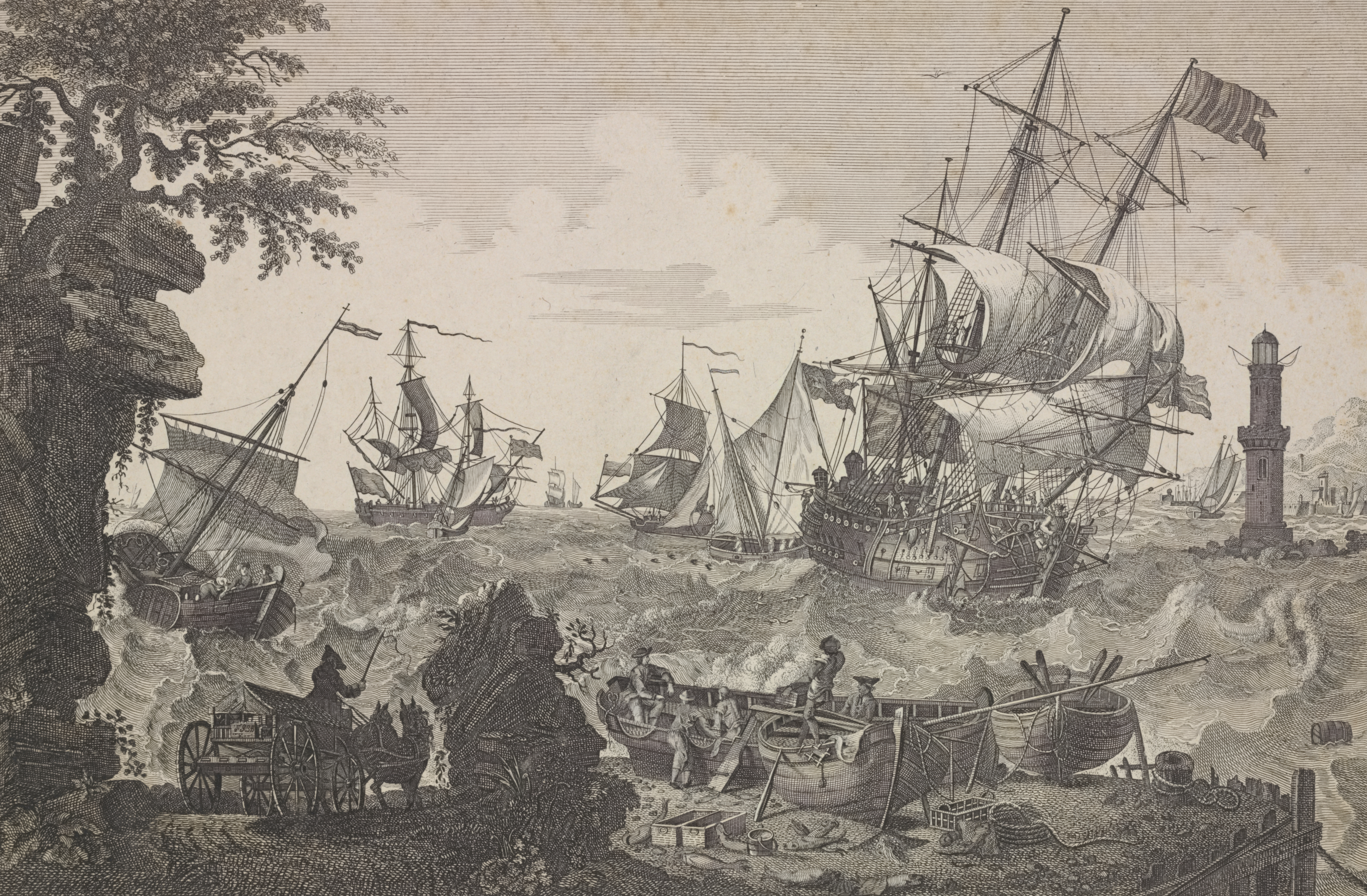
Prince George arriving in New York on 16 October 1781

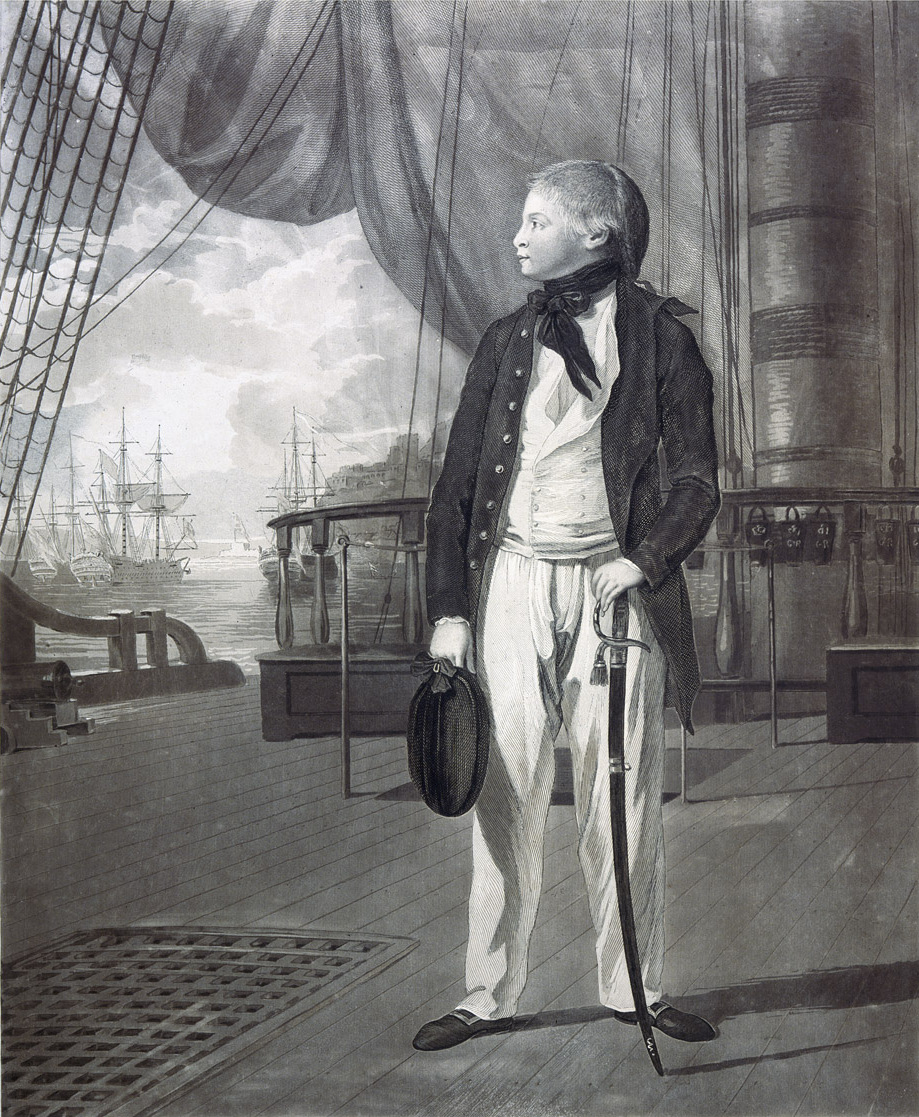
Prince William Henry as a midshipman on board Prince George in c. 1778

== Sources ==
- Lavery, Brian (1983). The Ship of the Line – Volume 1: The development of the battlefleet 1650–1850. London: Conway Maritime Press. ISBN 0-85177-252-8.
- Brown, David K. (1990). Before the Ironclad: Development of Ship Design, Propulsion and Armament in the Royal Navy, 1815–60. London: Conway Maritime Press. ISBN 9780851775326.
