= Charles S. Hamilton (admiral) =

United States Navy officer (born 1952)

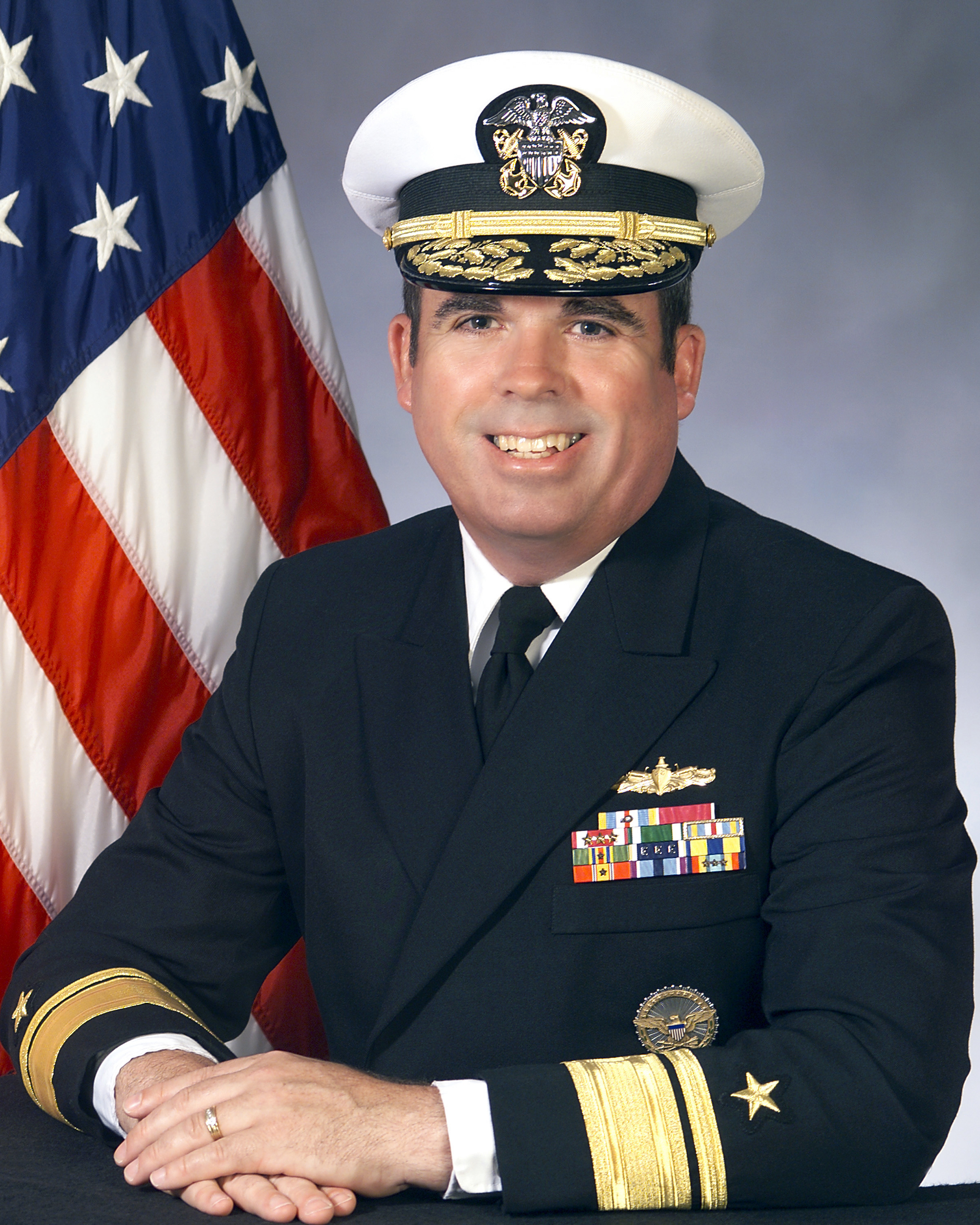
RADM Charles S. Hamilton

Charles Samuel Hamilton (born 1952) is a retired award-winning rear admiral in the United States Navy.

Hamilton is a native of Amityville, New York, and graduated from Duke University with a Bachelor of Science in Zoology in May 1974. He was commissioned in the Navy in May 1974 through the Naval Reserve Officer Training Candidate (NROTC).

Hamilton's sea tours include Electronics Material Officer and Combat Information Center Officer on board USS Hawkins (DD-873) (1974 to 1976); Fire Control Officer and Missile Officer on board USS Coontz (DDG-40) (1976 to 1978); Operations Officer on board USS Callaghan (DDG-994) (1981 to 1984); Executive Officer, USS Fox (DLG-33) (1986 to 1988); and Commanding Officer USS O'Brien (DD-975) (1991 to 1993).

Hamilton's shore tours include Anti-Submarine Warfare Program Analyst and Administrative Assistant to Director, Program Resource Appraisal Division (OP-91), Office of the Chief of Naval Operations (1984 to 1986); Head AEGIS Destroyer Section (OP-355F) and Financial Coordinator, AEGIS Cruiser Destroyer Branch, Office of the Chief of Naval Operations (1986 to 1988); and Military Staff Specialist for Naval Warfare in the Office of the Under Secretary of Defense (Acquisition & Technology) (1994 to 1996).

In May 1996, Hamilton became Program Manager for the Arsenal Ship, which was designed to provide massed precision fires in support of Fleet Commander's warfighting requirements. After completing the first two design phases and passing significant acquisition reform lessons learned to the DD 21 Program Office, Hamilton closed down the Arsenal Ship Program in March 1998.

From April 1998 to February 2000, Hamilton served as Deputy for Fleet in the Program Executive Office Theater Surface Combatants (PEO TSC-F). In this position, he was responsible for Fleet Introduction and Lifetime Support of 120 surface combatants (DDG 51, CG 47, DDG 993, DD 963, FFG 7).

Hamilton served as Program Executive Officer for Surface Strike (PEO (S)) from February 2000 until November 2002. As PEO (S), he managed the Zumwalt-class DD 21/DD(X), Naval Surface Fire Support (NSFS), Advanced Land Attack Missile (ALAM), Integrated Power System (IPS), and Affordability Through Commonality (ATC) Programs, as well as the Littoral Combat Ship initiative.

Hamilton became Deputy Program Executive Officer for Ships (PEO Ships) in November 2002 and in April 2003 was named Program Executive Officer for Ships. PEO Ships provides the Navy with a single, platform-focused organization responsible for the research, development, systems integration, construction, and lifecycle support of current and future surface combatant, amphibious and auxiliary ships to include: DD, FFG, DDG, CG, DDG 1000, LCS, MCM, MHC, LPD-17, LHD, LHA(R), Sealift Ships, CLF Ships, Special Mission Ships, Coast Guard Deepwater Support, Small Boats and Craft, Command Ships, and MSC vessels.

Hamilton's graduate education includes Naval Postgraduate School, Monterey, California, where he graduated with distinction, receiving a Masters of Arts in National Security Affairs (1981), and the National War College where he graduated with distinction and was awarded a Master of Science in National Security Strategy (1994).

Hamilton's awards include the Defense Superior Service Medal (oak leaf cluster in lieu of second award), Legion of Merit (gold star in lieu of second award), Meritorious Service Medal (with three gold stars), Navy Commendation Medal and various unit and service awards.
