= Laforey =

Laforey is a surname. Notable people with the surname include:

- Francis Laforey (1767–1835), British admiral
- John Laforey (1729–1796), British naval officer
- Laforey baronets

== Other uses ==
- HMS Laforey
