= Frigate action of 29 May 1794 =

Action of the French Revolutionary Wars

- Part of the French Revolutionary Wars
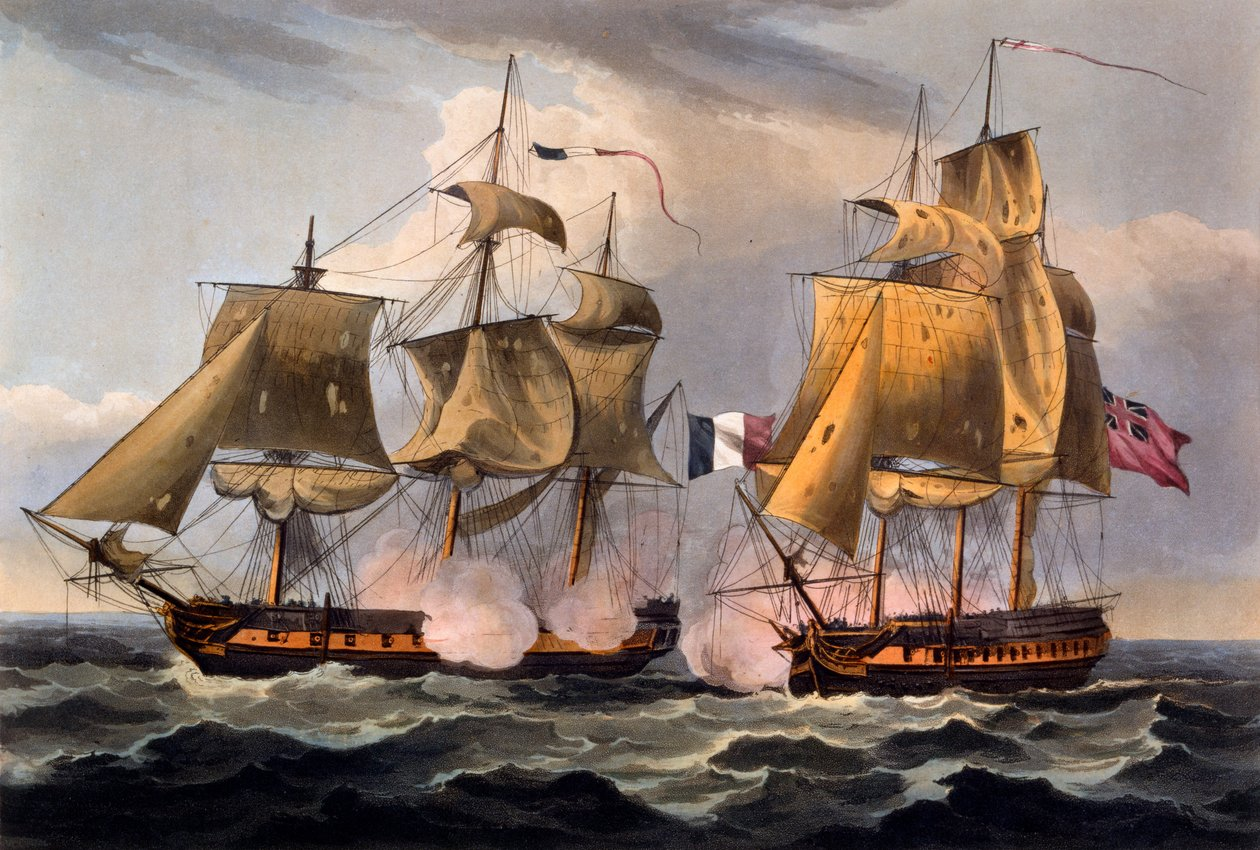
- Capture of the Castor, May 29th 1794, Thomas Whitcombe
Date	29 May 1794
Location	Off Cape Finisterre, Atlantic Ocean
Result	British victory

Belligerents
Great Britain	France

Commanders and leaders
Francis Laforey	L'Huillier

Strength
1 frigate	1 frigate

Casualties and losses
1 killed; 4 wounded	1 frigate captured; 16 killed; 9 wounded

The frigate action of 29 May 1794—not to be confused with the much larger fleet action of 29 May 1794 that took place in the same waters at the same time—was a minor naval engagement of the French Revolutionary Wars between a Royal Navy frigate and a French Navy frigate. The action formed a minor part of the Atlantic campaign of May 1794, a campaign which culminated in the battle of the Glorious First of June, and was unusual in that the French ship Castor had only been in French hands for a few days at the time of the engagement. Castor had previously been a British ship, seized on 19 May by a French battle squadron in the Bay of Biscay and converted to French service while still at sea. While the main fleets manoeuvered around one another, Castor was detached in pursuit of a Dutch merchant ship and on 29 May encountered the smaller independently cruising British frigate HMS Carysfort.

Captain Francis Laforey on Carysfort immediately attacked the larger ship and in an engagement lasting an hour and fifteen minutes successfully forced its captain to surrender, discovering a number of British prisoners of war below decks. Castor was subsequently taken back to Britain and an extended legal case ensued between the Admiralty and Captain Laforey over the amount of prize money that should be awarded for the victory. Ultimately Laforey was successful, in part due to testimony from the defeated French captain, proving his case and claiming the prize money. The lawsuit did not harm Laforey's career and he later served at the Battle of Trafalgar and became a prominent admiral.

== Background ==
During the spring of 1794, the newly declared French Republic faced famine. In an effort to secure the required food supplies, large quantities were ordered from the French American colonies and from the United States, which gathered in a large convoy of merchant vessels off Hampton Roads in Virginia. On 2 April the convoy sailed for Europe under Contre-Admiral Pierre Vanstabel, expecting to meet a squadron under Contre-Admiral Joseph-Marie Nielly en route while the main French Atlantic Fleet under Contre-Admiral Villaret de Joyeuse held off the British Channel Fleet under Lord Howe. On 6 May, Nielly's ships sailed from Rochefort and soon passed out of the Bay of Biscay and into the Central Atlantic, where they encountered a British convoy sailing from Newfoundland. The convoy was unprepared for the encounter, and escorted only by the frigate HMS Castor under Captain Thomas Troubridge. Nielly, whose squadron included five ships of the line and several smaller warships, ordered an attack on the convoy and after a brief chase ten merchant ships were captured and Castor was run down by the ship of the line Patriote, the British vessel offering no resistance in the face of such overwhelming odds.

Troubridge and most of his crew were removed from their ship and taken aboard Nielly's flagship Sans Pareil, where they remained for the rest of the campaign. They were replaced by 200 French sailors taken from Nielly's squadron, as Castor was hastily refitted at sea for service with the French Navy. Command was given to Captain L'Huillier, who operated as a scout for Nielly's squadron until 24 May, when he became detached while chasing the Dutch merchant ship Maria Gertruda, which had been separated from a Dutch convoy that had been attacked by Villaret's fleet on 19 May. Separated from Nielly's ships, L'Huillier turned back towards Europe with the Dutch ship in tow. While the French fleets and squadrons searched the Eastern Atlantic for the convoy, the Royal Navy was equally active with a number of squadrons and independently sailing warships complementing the main fleet under Lord Howe. One such ship was the small 28-gun frigate HMS Carysfort under Captain Francis Laforey. Laforey was cruising the Eastern Atlantic for signs of the French convoy when on 29 May his lookouts sighted two sails ahead.

== Battle ==
Laforey immediately advanced on the strange sails, which were soon revealed to be Castor and the Dutch merchant ship. With Carysfort bearing down on him L'Huillier cast off the tow and prepared for battle, meeting the approaching British frigate with a broadside. The engagement was fought at close range and with little manoeuvering by either side, the ships exchanging broadsides for an hour and fifteen minutes before L'Huillier surrendered. His ship was heavily battered in the exchange, with the main topgallantmast knocked down and the mainmast and hull severely damaged. Carysfort suffered just one man killed and four wounded from the understrength crew of 180, while casualties were much heavier among the approximately 200 men aboard Castor, the French losing 16 men killed and nine wounded. The Dutch ship initially escaped, but was later captured and its value was eventually included in the prize money paid for Castor.

Laforey's success was considered impressive by historian William James, as his ship carried only 28 nine-pounder cannon in contrast with L'Huillier's 32 twelve-pounder guns and four 24-pounder carronades. Castor was also a larger ship with a slightly larger crew, and although L'Huillier and his men had only been aboard for ten days, the crew of Carysfort had only come together immediately before the cruise and had not had much longer to become acquainted with their vessel than the French crew.

== Aftermath ==
Laforey placed a boarding party aboard Castor, who discovered an officer and 18 British sailors held as prisoners below decks, part of the original crew of the ship. These men were freed and joined the prize crew in bringing the ship back to Britain. The rest of the crew, including Captain Troubridge, remained on Nielly's flagship throughout the subsequent campaign and witnessed the battle of the Glorious First of June, at which Sans Pareil was captured by Lord Howe's fleet. The French fleet was defeated, losing seven ships, but the convoy had passed safely to the north during the battle and eventually reached France without interception by the cruising British squadrons.

When Castor returned to Britain, the frigate was classed by the Admiralty and the Navy Board as "salvage" rather than as a prize. The laws regarding salvage meant that the proportion of prize money due to be paid to Laforey and his crew was significantly reduced by the declaration. The grounds for this judgement were that after its capture by the French, Castor was not taken into a French harbour and properly condemned by a French prize court and commissioned into the French Navy, the normal legal requirement for what was termed a "complete prize". On behalf of his men Laforey brought a legal challenge against the ruling to the High Court of Admiralty to determine the status of Castor. The judge, Sir James Marriott, heard evidence from a number of parties, including a deposition by Captain L'Huillier that described Admiral Nielly's standing orders to fit out any captured warships at sea for continued service in the campaign. After considering the evidence Marriott ruled that Castor was a legitimate prize "setting forth as a ship of war", and that the normal prize rules should apply to Laforey's case. The prize money for the purchase of the frigate was therefore authorised to be paid at Plymouth on 20 July 1795.

The result of the case did not damage Laforey's career: his junior officers were promoted after the action and he was given command of the larger frigate HMS Aimable. He went on to serve at the Battle of Trafalgar and become a full admiral before his death in 1835. However, historian Tom Wareham has speculated that the legal case was probably the reason that Laforey was denied the knighthood that customarily accompanied a successful frigate action at this stage of the war. More than five decades later the battle was among the actions recognised by a clasp attached to the Naval General Service Medal, awarded upon application to all British participants from Carysfort still living in 1847.

== Bibliography ==
- Clowes, William Laird (1997) [1900]. The Royal Navy, A History from the Earliest Times to 1900, Volume IV. Chatham Publishing. ISBN 1-86176-013-2.
- Gardiner, Robert, ed. (2001) [1996]. Fleet Battle and Blockade. Caxton Editions. ISBN 1-84067-363-X.
- James, William (2002) [1827]. The Naval History of Great Britain, Volume 1, 1793–1796. Conway Maritime Press. ISBN 0-85177-905-0.
- Wareham, Tom (2001). The Star Captains, Frigate Command in the Napoleonic Wars. Chatham Publishing. ISBN 1-86176-169-4.
- Woodman, Richard (2001). The Sea Warriors. Constable Publishers. ISBN 1-84119-183-3.
