= James Marriott (judge) =

British judge, politician and scholar

Sir James Marriott

Judge of the High Court of Admiralty
- In office 1778–1798
- Monarch: George III
- Preceded by: Sir George Hay
- Succeeded by: Sir William Scott

Personal details
- Born: 29 October 1730 Twinstead Hall, Essex
- Died: 21 March 1803 (aged 72) Twinstead Hall, Essex
- Education: Trinity Hall, Cambridge

Sir James Marriott (29 October 1730 – 21 March 1803) was a British judge, politician and scholar of the late eighteenth century who is best known for his service as Judge of the High Court of Admiralty.

Although he presided over a number of naval cases, his contribution to legal history lies principally in the publication of Formulare instrumentorum, a text on admiralty law.

Marriott served as Member of Parliament for Sudbury between 1780 and 1784 and 1796 and 1802.

== Life ==
James Marriott was born on 29 October 1730, the son of attorney Benjamin Marriott and his wife Esther at Twinstead Hall in Essex. In June 1746 he was sent to Trinity Hall, Cambridge, and was elected a scholar in 1747 and graduated LLB in 1751. Although he originally intended a career in the church, he switched to the legal profession in 1755, possibly due to the influence of his stepfather Everard Sayer, a prominent lawyer. He completed an LLD in 1757, having spent the previous three years as librarian to the Duke of Newcastle and having been made a Fellow of Trinity Hall in 1756. He subsequently joined the College of Advocates and began an undistinguished legal career in which he published twice on the issue of neutral's rights.

It was while in the service of Duke of Newcastle that he began his lifelong obsession with patronage, securing the position of Receiver of Land Tax for Suffolk, but otherwise achieving little until the accession of King George III in 1760, when he transferred his allegiance to the King's new ministers, alienating Newcastle in the process. In 1764 he was elected Master of Trinity Hall and in 1767 was made king's advocate, although in both cases the promotion had more to do with a lack of suitable candidates than Marriott's own abilities. In 1767 he served as Vice-Chancellor of the University of Cambridge for a year and in 1768 was prevented from taking up the position of Professor of Modern History by Thomas Gray.

For the next ten years, he relentlessly demanded further promotion, provoking Lord Grafton to fury in the process, but did not receive anything further until 1778 when he was knighted and made the Judge of the High Court of Admiralty, responsible for naval and maritime cases. His service as king's advocate was considered unimpressive, particularly his lack of discretion and courtroom manners and his aggressive speeches against the American colonies and his own colleagues. In 1781 he was elected to Parliament for Sudbury as a supporter of Lord North, making a severe gaffe by seriously suggesting in response to American claims of "no taxation without representation" that the Americans were actually represented by Kent based on the original charters of the Thirteen Colonies. When North resigned, Marriott immediately switched allegiance to Lord Shelburne and the anti-war party, but did not contest his seat at the 1784 election. In 1786 he was again named as Vice-Chancellor of the University of Cambridge, but refused the post on the basis of his legal work. He subsequently sat on several admiralty boards and revised the laws regarding prize money in 1793.

The outbreak of the French Revolutionary Wars in 1793 and the corresponding increase in naval activity greatly strained Marriott's work load, although he produced some notable decisions, particularly in a 1794 case in which Captain Francis Laforey of HMS Carysfort sued the Admiralty over the prize money to be awarded for his capture of the French frigate Castor at the Frigate action of 29 May 1794. In that case, Marriott found in favour of Laforey's claim, setting a precedent in the laws of salvage. He was also re-elected for Sudbury in 1796 after some highly questionable activity: he initially supported the existing MP John Coxe Hippisley, only to withdraw his support at a late stage and announce his own candidacy, causing Hippisley to resign in anger at his behaviour. Marriott remained in Parliament until 1802, shortly before his death.

Annuity to Sir James Marriott Act 1799
- Act of Parliament
- Parliament of Great Britain
- Long title: An act to enable his Majesty to grant a certain annuity to Sir James Marriott knight, late judge of the high court of admiralty, in consideration of his diligent and faithful services in the execution of that office.
- Citation: 39 Geo. 3. c. 58
- Territorial extent: Great Britain

Dates
- Royal assent: 13 June 1799
- Commencement: 13 June 1799 (Note: The Acts of Parliament (Commencement) Act 1793.)
- Repealed: 21 August 1871
Other legislation
Repealed by	Statute Law Revision Act 1871

Status: Repealed

Text of statute as originally enacted

Marriott resigned from the Admiralty in 1798, to be replaced by Sir William Scott, generally considered to be a much more able man. He returned to Twinstead Hall and remained there until his death on 21 March 1803, having substantially redeveloped the house and rebuilt the local church. The year before he died he created his most important work, Formulare instrumentorum, a text based on his work with admiralty law that had a strong influence on maritime law in the United States. Aside from his final work, he produced a number of poems and legal texts of little distinction, described as describes as "slender literary accomplishments". He never married; his one effort in 1760 ending in refusal by both the girl and her father. Instead, he remained devoted to his mother until her death.

== Bibliography ==
- Polden, Patrick (2004). "Marriott, Sir James". Oxford Dictionary of National Biography (online ed.). Oxford University Press. doi:10.1093/ref:odnb/18091. (Subscription, Wikipedia Library access or UK public library membership required.)

Parliament of Great Britain
Preceded by Philip Champion Crespigny; Sir Patrick Blake	Member of Parliament for Sudbury; 1781–1784; With: Sir Patrick Blake	Succeeded by William Smith; John Langston
Preceded by John Coxe Hippisley; John Langston	Member of Parliament for Sudbury; 1796–1800; With: William Smith	Succeeded by Parliament of the United Kingdom
Parliament of the United Kingdom
Preceded by Parliament of Great Britain	Member of Parliament for Sudbury; 1801–1802; With: William Smith	Succeeded by John Pytches; Sir John Coxe Hippisley
Legal offices
Preceded by Sir George Hay	Judge of the High Court of Admiralty; 1778–1798	Succeeded by Sir William Scott
Academic offices
Preceded by Sir Edward Simpson	Master of Trinity Hall, Cambridge; 1764–1803	Succeeded by Sir William Wynne
Preceded by John Smith	Vice-Chancellor of the University of Cambridge; 1767–1767	Succeeded by John Hinchliffe
Preceded by Joseph Turner	Vice-Chancellor of the University of Cambridge; 1786	Succeeded by William Elliston
