= Ontario (disambiguation) =

Ontario is a province in east-central Canada.

Ontario may also refer to:

== Places ==
=== Belize ===
- Ontario, Belize, a village in Cayo District, Belize

=== Canada ===
- Ontario County, Ontario, the name of several historic counties
- Ontario (federal electoral district), a defunct federal electoral district
- Ontario (provincial electoral district), a defunct provincial electoral district
- Ecclesiastical Province of Ontario, an Anglican province

=== United States ===
- Ontario, California
- Ontario, Illinois
- Ontario, Indiana
- Ontario, Iowa
- Ontario, New York
- Ontario (CDP), New York
- Ontario County, New York
- Ontario, Ohio
- Ontario, Oregon
- Ontario, Wisconsin
- Ontario Township (disambiguation)

== Lakes ==
- Lake Ontario, one of the Great Lakes on the boundary between the Canadian province of Ontario and the U.S. state of New York
- Ontario Lacus, a dark feature near the south pole of Saturn's moon Titan

== Ships ==
- HMCS Ontario, several Canadian naval vessels
  - HMCS Ontario (C53)
- HMS Ontario, several British naval vessels
  - HMS Ontario (1780), British warship sunk during the American Revolution
- USS Ontario, several American naval vessels

== Other uses ==
- Ontario (computer virus)
- Ontario (processor), a computer APU from AMD
- Ontario International Airport (ONT) in Ontario, California
- Ontario Motor Speedway, a 2.5-mile racetrack in Ontario, California
- 45554 Ontario, a British LMS Jubilee Class locomotive
- Ontario Bus Industries, the former name of Canadian bus manufacturer Orion Bus Industries

== See also ==
- Ontarioville, Illinois
