= ONT =

ONT or Ont may refer to:

== Organisations ==
- Organización Nacional de Transplantes (National Transplant Organization), Spain
- Ordo Novi Templi (Order of the New Templars), a fascist society founded in 1900
- Ontario Network Television, Canada, later Baton Broadcast System, then merged into CTV
- Obshchenatsional'noe Televidenie (All-National Television), a Belarusian television station
- Oxford Nanopore Technologies, UK company

== Transportation ==
- On Ting stop (MTR station, code ONT), Hong Kong
- Ontario International Airport (IATA code ONT), California, US
- Ontario Northland Railway, Canada

== Science and technology ==
- Optical network terminal, connecting premises to fiber optic network
- Ortho-nitrotoluene, an organic compound

== Other uses ==
- Ontario (Ont.), a province of Canada
- Ontology

== See also ==
- Ontario (disambiguation)
