= Hutt Island =

Island in British Columbia, Canada

Coordinates: 49.409°N 123.383°W

Hutt Island is a small island located off the coast of Bowen Island, British Columbia, Canada. It was named after Captain John Hutt, captain of HMS Queen in the battle of the Glorious First of June.
