= HMCS Ontario =

Badge of HMCS Ontario

HMCS Ontario can refer to several ships:

- HMS Ontario (1780), a sixth-rate warship of the Provincial Marine (of then British North American Province of Quebec) and operated by the Royal Navy in Lake Ontario; sunk 1780
- HMCS Ontario (C53), a Minotaur-class cruiser transferred to the Royal Canadian Navy in 1944 and scrapped in 1960
- HMCS Ontario, a Royal Canadian Sea Cadet summer training centre in Kingston, Ontario established in 1977 as Cadets Camp Frontenac and now based at CFB Kingston/Royal Military College of Canada
- HMCS Ontario was a planned nuclear-powered Canada-class submarine cancelled in 1989

== See also ==
- Ontario (disambiguation)
- HMS Ontario
- USS Ontario
