= Atlantic campaign of May 1794 =

Campaign of the War of the First Coalition

- Part of the War of the First Coalition
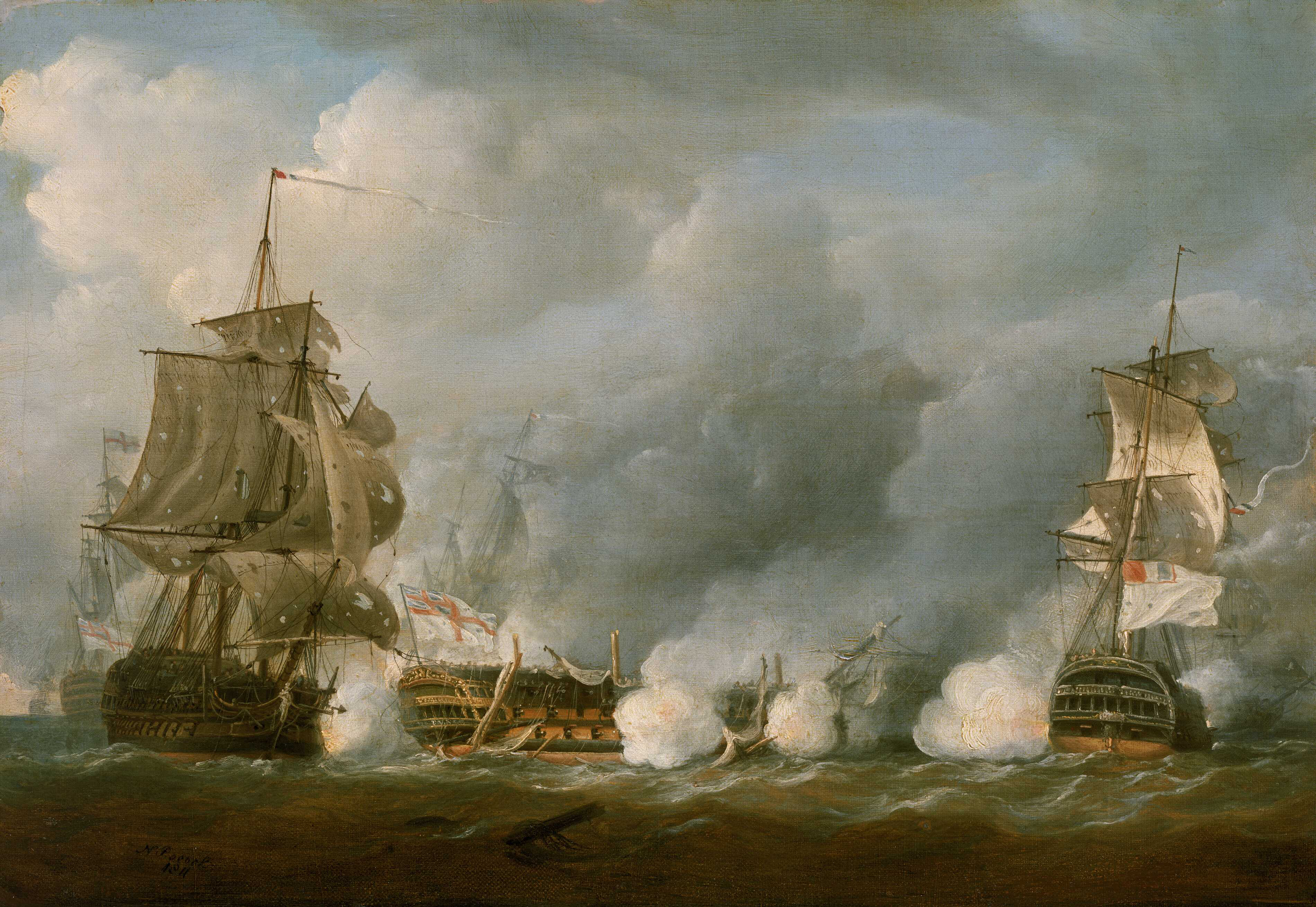
- The Glorious First of June, the campaign's culminating battle
Date	2 May 1794 – 1 June 1794
Location	Atlantic Ocean
Result	See Aftermath

Belligerents
Great Britain	France

Commanders and leaders
Richard Howe; George Montagu	Villaret de Joyeuse; Joseph-Marie Nielly

The Atlantic campaign of May 1794 was a series of operations conducted by the Royal Navy's Channel Fleet against the French Navy's Atlantic Fleet, with the aim of preventing the passage of a strategically important French grain convoy travelling from the United States to France. The campaign involved commerce raiding by detached forces and two minor engagements, eventually culminating in the full fleet action of the Glorious First of June 1794, at which both fleets were badly mauled and both Britain and France claimed victory. The French lost seven ships of the line; the British none, but the battle distracted the British fleet long enough for the French convoy to safely reach port.

By the spring of 1794, the French Republic, ruled by the National Convention, was at war with all its neighbours. With famine imminent, the French Committee of Public Safety looked to France's colonies and the United States to provide an infusion of grain; this was to be convoyed across the Atlantic during April, May and June, accompanied by a small escort squadron and supported by a second, larger squadron in the Bay of Biscay. However, political upheaval had severely reduced the French Navy's ability to fight coherently and supply shortages had devastated its morale, significantly weakening the fleet. Britain, by contrast, was at a high state of readiness with a well-organised command structure, but was suffering from a severe shortage of trained seamen with which to man its large navy. The French Atlantic Fleet, under Admiral Villaret de Joyeuse, was tasked with keeping the British Channel Fleet occupied long enough for the convoy to reach France safely. The Channel Fleet, commanded by Richard Howe, knew of the convoy's passage, and dispatched squadrons to protect British commerce while pursuing Villaret himself with the main body of the Royal Navy's Channel Fleet. For over a week the two battlefleets manoeuvred around one another, Villaret drawing Howe deeper westwards into the Atlantic and away from the convoy. Two partial but inconclusive fleet actions on 28 and 29 May followed, during which Howe seized the weather gage from Villaret, granting him freedom to choose the time and place of his next attack.

The culminating action of the campaign took place over 400 nautical miles (740 km) into the Atlantic, and became known as the Glorious First of June. This final engagement saw Howe use the weather gage to attack Villaret directly while his opponent attempted to fight in a traditional line of battle formation. In the battle, the British fleet inflicted a heavy defeat on the French after a bitterly contested day of fighting. Forcing Villaret to retreat, Howe's force captured seven French battleships, one of which later sank, and inflicted 7,000 casualties on the enemy. Villaret however, claimed strategic success as his delaying tactics had bought enough time for the convoy to reach France safely. The battle was the first in a series of defeats the French Navy suffered during the early years of the war, which bred a defeatist attitude and an unwillingness among the French officer corps to engage the British at sea.

== Background ==
In the winter of 1793, war and internal disorder had combined with poor weather to leave France facing starvation following the collapse of the harvest. France's ongoing conflict with her neighbours precluded overland imports; the only nation willing and able to sell grain to the National Convention was the United States. Importing food from the Americas was a highly risky venture, as the British Royal Navy—at war with France since early 1793—patrolled much of the Atlantic passage. To provide effective protection for the vessels involved, a plan was agreed between France and the United States to collect the supplies over a period of months and transport them in a single convoy. A gathering point was arranged at Hampton Roads in the Chesapeake Bay.

A squadron commanded by Admiral Pierre Vanstabel was dispatched to Hampton Roads to provide escort. Vanstabel would bring the convoy to the Bay of Biscay, where a second squadron under Joseph-Marie Nielly would reinforce him for the rest of the journey. Together, these officers mustered six ships of the line and numerous smaller craft. The main French battlefleet of 25 ships under Admiral Villaret de Joyeuse would cruise the Bay of Biscay in order to challenge the British Channel Fleet if it attempted to intercept the supplies. The convoy's passage was expected to take approximately two months, and it included 117 merchant ships carrying enough food to feed France for a year.

Howe, the commander of the Channel Fleet, was aware of the convoy's nature and destination long before it left the Chesapeake, and made preparations to block its passage. Sending several small squadrons to protect British commerce crossing the Bay of Biscay, Howe detailed Admiral George Montagu with six battleships to search for the convoy in the south of the Bay while Howe took the main body of the fleet, 26 ships of the line, to patrol near Brest.

== May 1794 ==
April 1794 was a month of fevered activity on both sides of the English Channel as Villaret and Howe made their final preparations for the coming campaign. The slow French convoy had departed American waters on 2 April, and British convoys destined for the Empire had sailed from Portsmouth on 2 May. Howe used his whole force to provide them with protection as far as the Western Approaches, and on 5 May sent the frigates HMS Latona and HMS Phaeton close in to Brest to ascertain the status of the French—they reported that Villaret's battlefleet was still in harbour.

=== Commerce raiding ===
Out in the Atlantic, the detached squadrons of Nielly (French) and Montagu (British) were commerce raiding against enemy merchant shipping, but had thus far failed to find the main food convoy. Nielly encountered a British convoy from Newfoundland and took ten ships as prizes—including the convoy escort, the 32-gun frigate HMS Castor. Thomas Troubridge, captain of the Castor, would spend the entire campaign aboard Nielly's flagship Sans Pareil. Montagu also met with some success on 15 May, recapturing the merchant ships Nielly had taken, along with the French corvette Marie-Guiton and accurate intelligence on the direction and size of the French convoy which Montagu immediately passed to Howe. Resuming his patrol in the Mid-Atlantic, Nielly found the convoy from America a few days later, and transferred two of his ships to Vanstabel's escort to augment the convoy's defences. He then returned to the Eastern Atlantic to look for signs of British activity which might pose a threat to its passage. He also dispatched frigates to Villaret, carrying information about the convoy's location and speed.

While Nielly and Montagu searched out at sea, Howe took his fleet on a series of cruises back and forth across the Bay of Biscay in the hope of catching the convoy. Between 5 and 18 May he found nothing and so returned to Brest, where his scouting frigates reported that the French battlefleet had gone. Taking advantage of dense fog, Villaret had sailed the previous day, his ships passing within earshot of the British fleet. The French admiral was on the trail of Nielly's squadron; his intention was to meet both Nielly and the convoy and combine forces; with superior numbers he would then be able to escort the convoy to France in safety. Having eluded Howe and still some days from his planned rendezvous, Villaret gained an unexpected success when he ran across a Dutch convoy of 53 vessels. Its escorts, Alliance and Waakzaamheid, fled at the sight of the approaching French fleet, and Villaret was free to attack the convoy, capturing 20 merchantmen.

=== Howe's pursuit ===
Howe realised that the direction of Villaret's departure would take him directly across Admiral Montagu's planned route, and that, should Montagu meet Villaret, the British squadron would be destroyed. Setting all sail in pursuit, Howe followed Villaret into the Atlantic on 20 May. The next day Howe's ships recaptured ten of the lost Dutch merchantmen, but he was forced to burn them since crewing them with British sailors would weaken his own already understrength fleet. Prisoners from these ships gave Howe the information that the French fleet was only a short distance ahead, but that it had been joined by an additional ship from Nielly's squadron as well as several frigates. By now satisfied that Montagu was safely to the southwest, Howe pressed on hoped to bring Villaret to battle within the week. On 23 May however, the British fleet was driven southwards by strong winds and had to slowly work its way north to find the French track again. The detour did however enable him to recapture and destroy four more of Villaret's Dutch prizes.

On the morning of 25 May Howe's pursuit finally bore fruit, when his scouting frigates spotted a lone French ship of the line at 04:00. This ship sighted Howe's force at the same time, and immediately made off in the direction of the French fleet. The fleeing battleship left behind an American merchant ship she had been towing, which when taken reported that the French ship was Audacieux, of Nielly's squadron. Pursuing Audacieux after burning the American prize, the British fleet also overran and burnt two French corvettes, the 20-gun Républicaine and 16-gun Inconnue. Continuing his chase over the next three days, on 28 May Howe's lookouts spotted the French on the eastern horizon slightly to the south, indicating that the French held the weather gage. (Note: The weather gage was a vital advantage in sailing warfare because the ships required wind of the correct volume and direction to conduct operations. When the wind was in the wrong direction, a captain could tack to compensate, but possessing the weather gage meant that a ship could use the wind to attack their opponent directly, without the need for complicated manoeuvre. As long as Villaret held the weather gage, Howe was unable to attack him as he wished and instead had to be on the defensive while simultaneously attempting to force Villaret to give up his advantage. Villaret could have used the weather gage to attack Howe at any time, but did not do so in order to buy time for the convoy to pass the British fleet.)

== 28 May ==
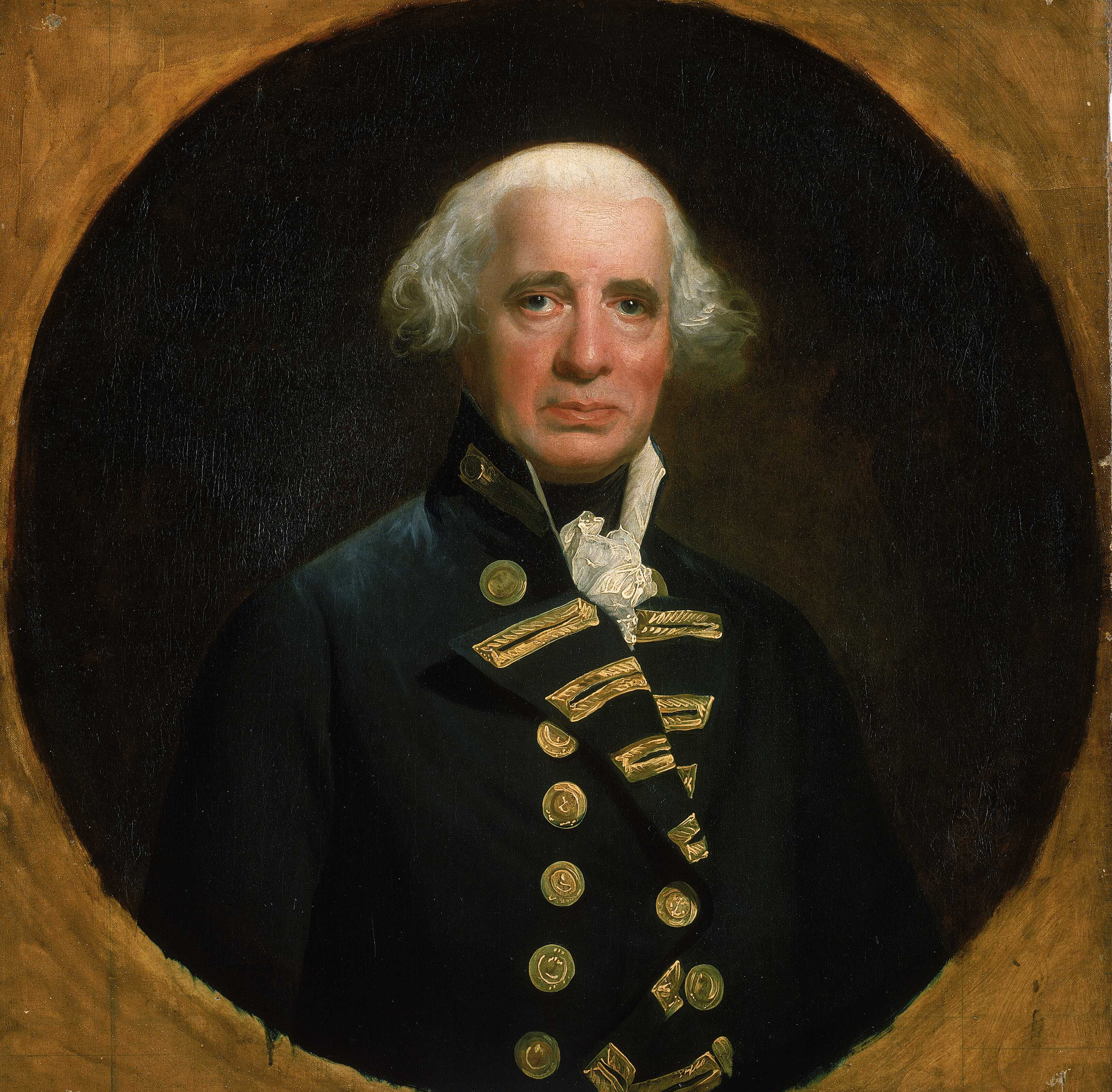
Portrait of Richard Howe by John Singleton Copley

With his enemy visible from the deck of his flagship by 06:30, Howe recalled his frigates and ordered his fleet to press on all sail in the hope of engaging the rear of the scattered French line. By 10:35 Howe's continued pursuit was making his own battleline ragged, but he pressed on in the belief that Villaret intended to use the weather gage to outrun him and escape. To counter this, Howe ordered his fastest ships into a flying squadron under Admiral Thomas Pasley. This squadron was significantly faster than the majority of the vessels in either fleet and rapidly closed with the French rear. The first shots of the engagement were fired at 14:30 by HMS Russell, commanded by John Willett Payne, which managed some long-distance fire at the rearmost French ships on the opposite tack. Fire was returned by the French but without significant effect. In an attempt to hold off Pasley's squadron, at 17:00 the French first rate 110-gun Révolutionnaire exchanged places with the smaller third rates at the rear of the line and engaged the pursuing British van. This manoeuvre was apparently conducted on the initiative of Captain Vandangel of Révolutionnaire without orders from Admiral Villaret or his political observer Jean Bon Saint-André.

Through a sharp and skilful tack, HMS Bellerophon, one of the slowest ships in the British van, succeeded in bringing the Révolutionnaire to steady action at 18:00. The ships exchanged fire for twenty minutes, the weaker Bellerophon taking severe damage to her rigging, and falling back to be replaced by HMS Marlborough under Captain George Cranfield Berkeley. Marlborough was joined by HMS Russell and HMS Thunderer, and between them they shot away much of the Révolutionnaire's rigging, so that by 19:30 she was unmanageable. HMS Leviathan also joined the action, firing at an unidentified ship ahead of Révolutionnaire. Concerned about Pasley's squadron becoming cut off from the main body of his fleet, Howe recalled them to the British line at 20:00. All complied except the newly arrived HMS Audacious under Captain William Parker. Audacious had engaged Révolutionnaire so closely that she could not safely withdraw, and although her gunnery eventually dismasted her huge opponent, Audacious took severe damage.

It was not until 22:00 that Audacious and Révolutionnaire disentangled themselves and limped apart—their respective fleets now some way off. Audacious's crew later claimed that Révolutionnaire had struck her colours during the engagement, although this has not been corroborated. Parker stated that he did not take possession of Révolutionnaire because he was concerned by the distant sighting of nine French battleships on the horizon. He had spotted a squadron under Commodore Jean-Joseph Castagnier, which was uninvolved in the current campaign and which soon disappeared without participating in any of the subsequent engagements. Audacious's crew made strenuous efforts to repair their ship and rejoin the British fleet during the night, but became disorientated and in the morning Audacious was still only half a mile from her former opponent.

Révolutionnaire had suffered much more severely than Audacious, but survived the encounter without being boarded thanks to a misread signal by Captain Albemarle Bertie of Thunderer, who failed to take possession of the dismasted three-decker when ordered to. During the night Villaret sent reinforcements to rescue Révolutionnaire, and at dawn on 29 May Parker saw that his large opponent was soon to be supported by the undamaged ship of the line Audacieux, the frigate Bellone, and two corvettes. Once more Audacious came under fire from Révolutionnaire, leaving her no option but to flee this superior force. Audacious was chased for half an hour by Bellone and the corvettes, before losing them in a rain squall, and eventually returned to Plymouth on 3 June. Révolutionnaire also escaped pursuit and was taken under tow by Audacieux, who brought her safely to Rochefort several days later. For leaving the battlefleet before the main engagement, Révolutionnaire's captain was subsequently arrested.

== 29 May ==
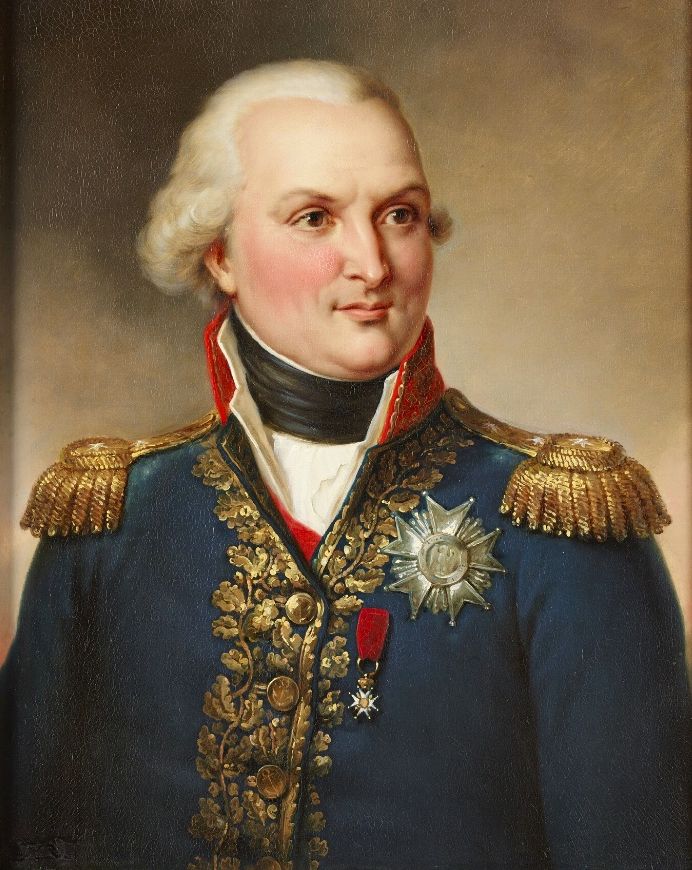
Louis Thomas Villaret de Joyeuse, 1839 painting by Guérin

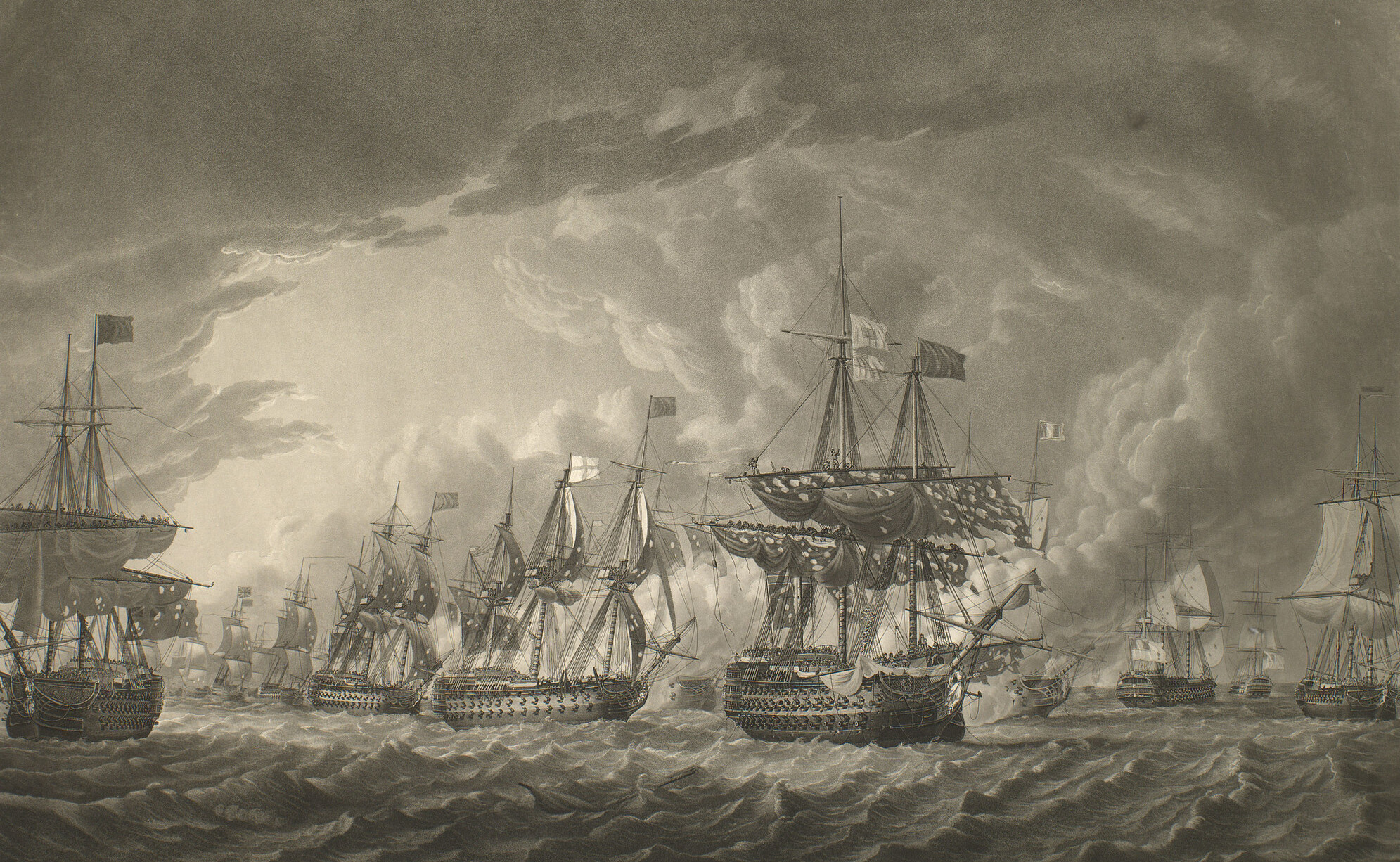
A view of the British fleet, in action with the French on 29 May 1794

With Audacious and Révolutionnaire lost in the dark behind them, both British and French fleets continued westwards towards the convoy rendezvous. At dawn on 29 May the British fleet saw Audacieux retiring to the east but did not follow, concentrating on the main French line with the hope of provoking a decisive engagement. Howe ordered his ships to pursue the enemy rear, and the British line was placed on a tack that was intended to cut through the French line and isolate and capture the ships east of the cut. Captain Anthony Molloy in HMS Caesar was chosen to lead the attack as his ship was the fastest in the fleet, but the manoeuvre was a complete failure due to the inexplicable refusal of Molloy to close with the enemy. Instead, Caesar and HMS Queen opened fire on the rearmost French ships from a distance. The vans of the opposing fleets then engaged in a long-range broadside duel from 10:00. This inflicted mild damage on both sides, the worst hit being the French Montagnard.

Having failed to cut the French line at his first attempt, Howe reissued the order at 12:30. Once more Caesar was to lead the way, with the intention of splitting the enemy fleet in half. Captain Molloy then refused to carry out the order, signalling without cause that Caesar was unable to tack and then turning and sailing eastwards down the outside of the British fleet, rather than towards the enemy. This unexpected move threw the following ships into a state of confusion; Queen, coming behind Caesar, attempted to obey Howe's signal alone but was badly damaged by shot, and her captain John Hutt mortally wounded. Unable to effectively manoeuvre, Queen passed down the outside of the French line, firing as she went.

His plan in tatters, Howe responded by example, leading his flagship HMS Queen Charlotte towards the French line which was rapidly slipping ahead of the British, steering around the meandering Caesar as he did so. Queen Charlotte first attempted to break through the French between the sixth and seventh ships from the rear, but was unable to reach this gap and instead sailed between the fifth and sixth, raking the sixth ship Éole from close range. Bellerophon and Lord Hugh Seymour in Leviathan followed close behind the flagship. Both battleships attempted to cut between the subsequent French ships; Bellerophon successfully, Leviathan prevented by damage to her helm. This manoeuvre changed the course of the battle, as Howe's ships isolated and raked the Terrible, Tyrannicide, and Indomptable, forcing Villaret to either abandon his ships or sacrifice the weather gage to save them.

As Howe pressed after the main body of the French fleet—now tailed by the damaged Terrible—the rest of his fleet followed, bombarding the already battered Tyrannicide and Indomptable as they passed. As HMS Orion, HMS Invincible, and HMS Barfleur cut through the French in turn, Villaret wore his fleet round to face Howe. Encouraged by Caesar's disobedience, he deliberately sacrificed the weather gage in the belief that Howe's fleet was more damaged than it appeared. All of Villaret's ships followed him except Montagnard, which refused to turn, claiming to be seriously damaged. Villaret's manoeuvre soon isolated the Queen Charlotte, Bellerophon, and Leviathan, which were forced to retreat hastily before the main French force. Having driven away the ships threatening Indomptable and Tyrannicide, Villaret reformed his fleet and attempted to escape westwards, closely followed by the British van who were now holding the weather gage. Both fleets were too damaged to continue action in the remaining daylight and firing stopped at 17:00. The British fleet has suffered 67 killed and 128 wounded during the day's fighting.

Evening found the fleets approximately 10 nautical miles (19 km) apart, sailing northwest. Both were conducting hasty repairs and attempting to ready themselves for what all assumed would be another day of battle on 30 May. Significantly, Lord Howe was unaware that to the northeast, over the same sea as the previous day's action had been fought, the ponderous convoy of merchant ships was passing, having successfully evaded British pursuit. Unlike his opponent Villaret knew the location of the convoy, which was joined that evening by the battered Montagnard. Escorting the convoy, Admiral Nielly had been apprised of the situation by Montagnard's captain, and had left his escort duties to reinforce Villaret.

In a postscript to the day's action the British frigate Castor, captured early in the campaign by Nielly, was attacked and retaken by the smaller HMS Carysfort under Captain Francis Laforey at the frigate action of 29 May 1794. Some of the crew were released by their rescuers but most, including the officers, were not aboard, having been taken onto Nielly's flagship Sans Pareil.

== Between the actions ==
On the morning of 30 May, Howe sent a signal to all his captains asking if they considered their ships ready for combat. All but Caesar replied in the affirmative and Howe pushed his ships after the retreating French. Despite holding the weather gage, Howe's pursuit was soon hampered by descending fog, and unable to see or come to grips with the enemy throughout the whole day, the admiral feared he may have lost his opportunity for battle. However, by 31 May the fog had cleared and the French were still within sight to the north. To the surprise of the British, none of the 26 battleships in the French fleet appeared to show battle damage, whereas many of the British ships were nursing damaged rigging and battered hulls. Villaret had made use of the fog to reorganise his force, losing Montagnard and the frigate Seine to the convoy but gaining the independently sailing battleship Trente-un-Mai and Nielly's squadron of Sans Pareil, Trajan, and Téméraire. Villaret had also dispatched the battered Indomptable for home, escorted by an undamaged French ship.

Throughout 31 May Howe's fleet closed with the French, making full use of the advantage of the weather gage. By 17:00 the fleets were five miles (9 km) apart, but at 19:00 Howe gave orders to keep his ships out of shot range but within easy sailing of the French. He did not want a repeat of the confusion of 29 May and preferred to delay any combat until he was assured of a full day in which to conduct it, in order that his signals not be obscured or misinterpreted. During the night the fleets remained in visual contact, and by first light on 1 June the British were just six miles (11 km) from Villaret's fleet and organising in preparation to attack once more. Both fleets were now sailing in a western direction, Villaret still hoping to draw Howe away from the convoy.

== Glorious First of June ==
Map of the Atlantic Ocean showing the position of the battle

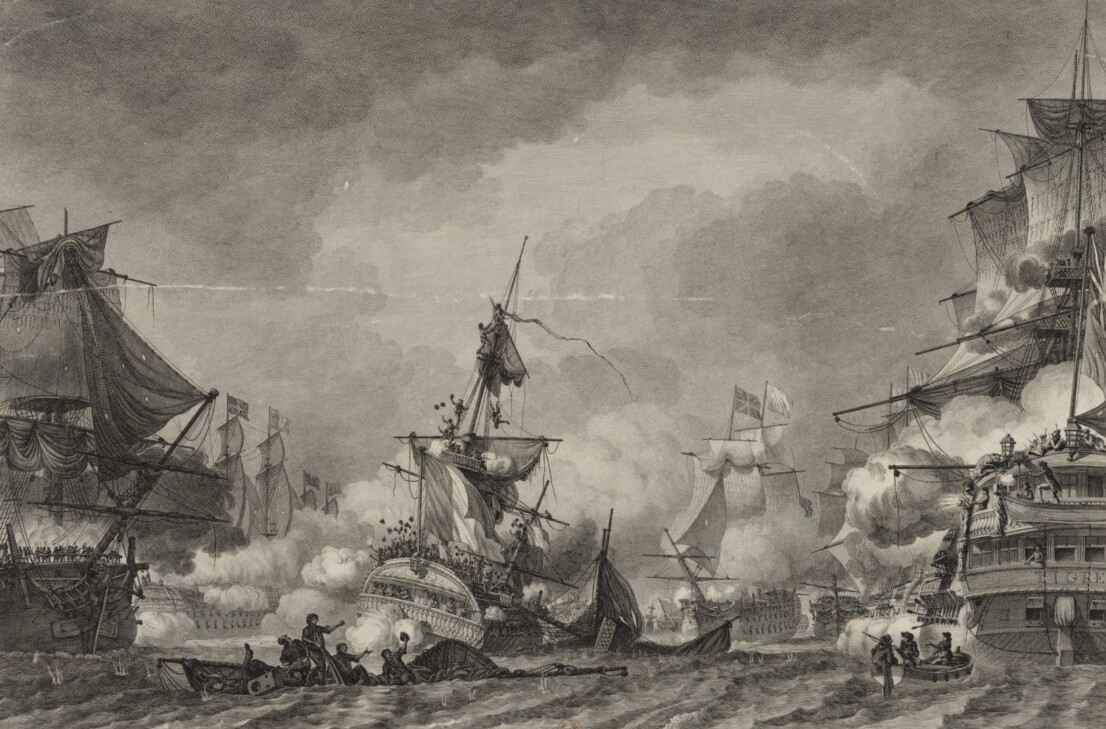
The sinking of the Vengeur du Peuple, engraving by P. Ozanne

At 09:24 on the morning of 1 June, Howe sent his ships into action using the original tactic of turning each ship in his line northwest simultaneously, so that they would bear down individually on Villaret's fleet and each break the enemy line separately. His intention was to cut the French line in 25 places, raking the enemy vessels at both bow and stern and dividing their fire so they could be defeated piecemeal. Ultimately though this ambitious plan failed, due to ill-discipline among Howe's subordinates and the damage his fleet had sustained over the previous week. While six of Howe's ships did break the French line as ordered, and several others came close, many of his captains failed to follow orders and instead engaged the enemy from a distance in desultory gun duels which had little effect.

As various British and French ships broke off into personal duels and some latecoming British ships struggled to get into action, Villaret led his flagship Montagne to the north and began assembling a coherent counter-force from those of his fleet which had escaped Howe's assault. In the melee itself several very hard-fought engagements took place—particularly that between HMS Brunswick and Vengeur du Peuple. At least twelve ships were dismasted, with the British battleships HMS Marlborough and HMS Defence losing all three masts and ten French vessels suffering similarly.

By 11:30 the initial action was dying down, and Villaret brought his reconstituted force back towards the battle site to contest ownership of the dismasted hulks floating there. Howe likewise reformed his main force and met Villaret, who failed to capture any of the battered British ships but did regather six of his own, leaving Howe with seven prizes. Of these, the wrecked Vengeur soon sank, although British boats had removed many of her crew. Howe was left in possession of the battle site, but Villaret had successfully held off the British long enough for the convoy to pass to the east unmolested. Both fleets returned to their home ports over the next week.

== Aftermath ==
While searching for the convoy during the first week of June, Montagu's squadron became trapped between two French squadrons and was forced to sail southwards to avoid Villaret's returning fleet. As a result, the French Atlantic seaboard was clear of British forces for a significant period. The food convoy arrived safely in France in the third week of June, and Montagu returned to Britain empty-handed. Both nations claimed victory in the campaign; the British by virtue of success in the only major action, and the French through the intact arrival of their convoy.

The campaign had notable effects on the navies of both Britain and France. The French did not directly contest British supremacy in Northern European waters again, spending most of the next 23 years in Brest and other ports, their few major sallies mainly directed at the Mediterranean. Continued upheavals in the French Navy resulted in a decline of quality in its officer corps, so that by the Battle of Trafalgar 11 years later the port-bound nature of the French fleet had resulted in a cautious and inexperienced tactical outlook. In Britain, the battle created a division within the Royal Navy's officer corps. Howe's dispatch after the battle criticised some officers who he believed had hesitated in action, and those officers received none of the honours distributed at the end of the campaign. Fallout from this dispute was widespread, with several senior figures resigning in disgust. Captain Molloy of HMS Caesar was ultimately court-martialled and dismissed from the service for failing to support his admiral.

== See also ==
- Glorious First of June

== Bibliography ==
- Gardiner, Robert (2001) [reprint of 1996]. "The Glorious First of June". Fleet Battle and Blockade. Caxton Editions. ISBN 1-84067-363-X.
- Ireland, Bernard (2000). Naval Warfare in the Age of Sail. Harper Collins. ISBN 0-00-414522-4.
- James, William (2002) [reprint of 1827]. The Naval History of Great Britain, Volume 1, 1793–1796. Conway Maritime Press. ISBN 0-85177-905-0.
- Jane, Fred T. (1997) [reprint of 1912]. The British Battle-Fleet. Conway Maritime Press. ISBN 0-85177-723-6.
- Mostert, Noel (2007). The Line upon a Wind: The Greatest War Fought at Sea Under Sail 1793 – 1815. Vintage Books. ISBN 978-0-7126-0927-2.
- Padfield, Peter (2000) [reprint of 1976]. Nelson's War. Wordsworth Military Library. ISBN 1-84022-225-5.
- Palmer, R. R. Twelve who Ruled Princeton University Press (2005; repr. of 1989 revision). ISBN 0-691-12187-7.
- Rodger, N.A.M. (2004). The Command of the Ocean. Allan Lane. ISBN 0-7139-9411-8.
- Tracy, Nicholas, ed. (1998). The Naval Chronicle, Volume 1, 1793–1798. Chatham Publishing. ISBN 1-86176-091-4.
- Williams, Henry Smith, ed. (1907). History of France, 1715–1815.
