= Buller baronets =

There have been two Buller baronetcies.

- Buller baronets of Churston Court (1790)
- Buller baronets of Trenant Park (1808): see Sir Edward Buller, 1st Baronet (1764–1824)

== See also ==
- Viscount Dilhorne
