= HMS Ontario =

HMS Ontario can refer to several ships:

- HMS Ontario (1755), a Royal Navy schooner captured in 1756
- HMS Ontario (1780), a Royal Navy brig-sloop that sank in a storm in Lake Ontario during the American Revolutionary War and whose wreck was discovered in June 2008 between Niagara and Rochester.
- HMS Ontario (1813), a Royal Navy Cruizer-class brig-sloop ordered as HMS Mohawk and sold off in 1832.

== See also ==
- Ontario (disambiguation)
- HMCS Ontario
- USS Ontario
