= John Hutt (Royal Navy officer) =

Captain John Hutt
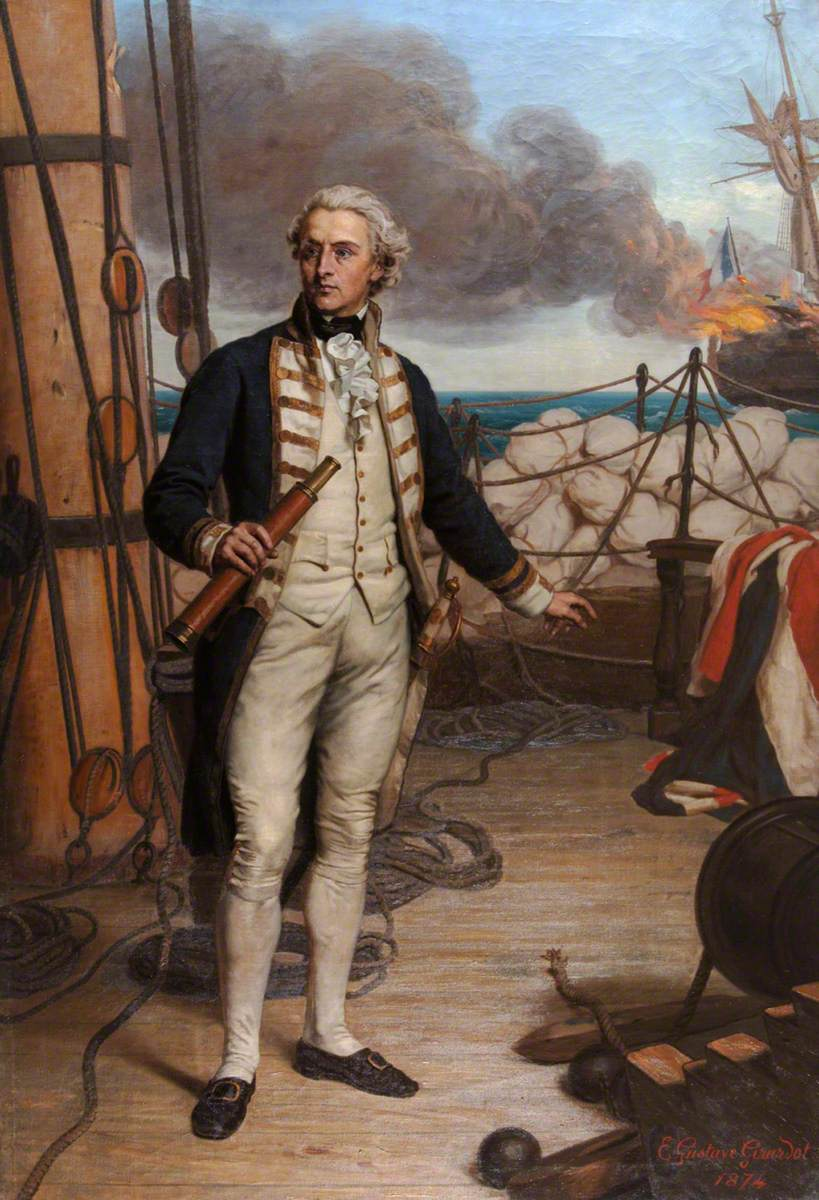
- Posthumous portrait by Ernest Gustave Girardot, 1874
- Born: 1746
- Died: 30 June 1794 (aged 47–48); Spithead, Hampshire
- Relatives: Sir William Hutt (nephew); Sir George Hutt (nephew); John Hutt (nephew)
- Military career
- Allegiance: Kingdom of Great Britain
- Branch: Royal Navy
- Service years: 1773–1794
- Rank: Captain
- Commands: HMS Antigua; HMS Trimmer; HMS Camilla; HMS Lizard; HMS Queen
- Conflicts: American Revolutionary War; Invasion of Tobago (POW); Nootka Crisis; French Revolutionary Wars; Action of 29 May 1794 (DOW); Glorious First of June

Captain John Hutt (1746 – 30 June 1794) was an officer of the British Royal Navy who served with distinction during the American Revolutionary War and died in 1794 from severe wounds received during the battle of the Glorious First of June, the first major naval battle of the French Revolutionary Wars. Hutt's ship, HMS Queen was heavily engaged in the action and in celebration of his career and death, a monument was raised to him and the other dead Royal Navy captains of the battle. Hutt Island, British Columbia, is named after him.

== American Revolutionary War ==
John Hutt was born in 1746 but did not begin a naval career until relatively late, becoming a lieutenant in the frigate HMS Lively in 1773. The ship was stationed on the North American Station and Hutt moved between ships rapidly during his service there, joining Hind and Scarborough in short order. Hutt later joined the fleet in the West Indies. In June 1780 Admiral Rodney appointed him commander of the small brig St Lucia. In October Rodney transferred Hutt to Sandwich. Then on 21 February 1781, Rodney gave Hutt command of the 14-gun brig Antigua, but Hutt did not have her long. On 28 May 1781, during a concerted effort to seize St Lucia from the British by French admiral de Grasse's fleet, a boarding party overwhelmed Antigua at Dauphin Creek.

The French captured Hutt and he remained in their hands until November 1781 when he was returned to England on parole. Hutt was exchanged for a French officer shortly afterwards and faced a court martial for the loss of his ship at which he was exonerated. In the summer of 1782, Hutt assumed command of the sloop Trimmer and after the peace, in 1783, he received promotion to post captain and took over the 20-gun Camilla. Hutt sailed Camilla to Jamaica, returning in 1787. In 1790 during the Spanish armament, Hutt assumed command of the frigate HMS Lizard, which operated as a fleet scout. He was stationed off Ferrol to observe the Spanish fleet and he brought the news to England that the Spanish had returned to Cádiz without threatening action.

== Glorious First of June ==
At the outbreak of the French Revolutionary Wars Hutt gained command of the 98-gun second rate HMS Queen, the result of patronage by Rear-Admiral Alan Gardner who had commanded Hutt in the West Indies and now personally requested him for this prestigious command. Hutt joined Gardner in the West Indies and Queen was involved in the first unsuccessful attempt to capture Martinique in 1793. A few months later, Gardner's squadron was attached to the Channel Fleet and with that horse, under Admiral Lord Howe, Queen participated in the Glorious First of June.

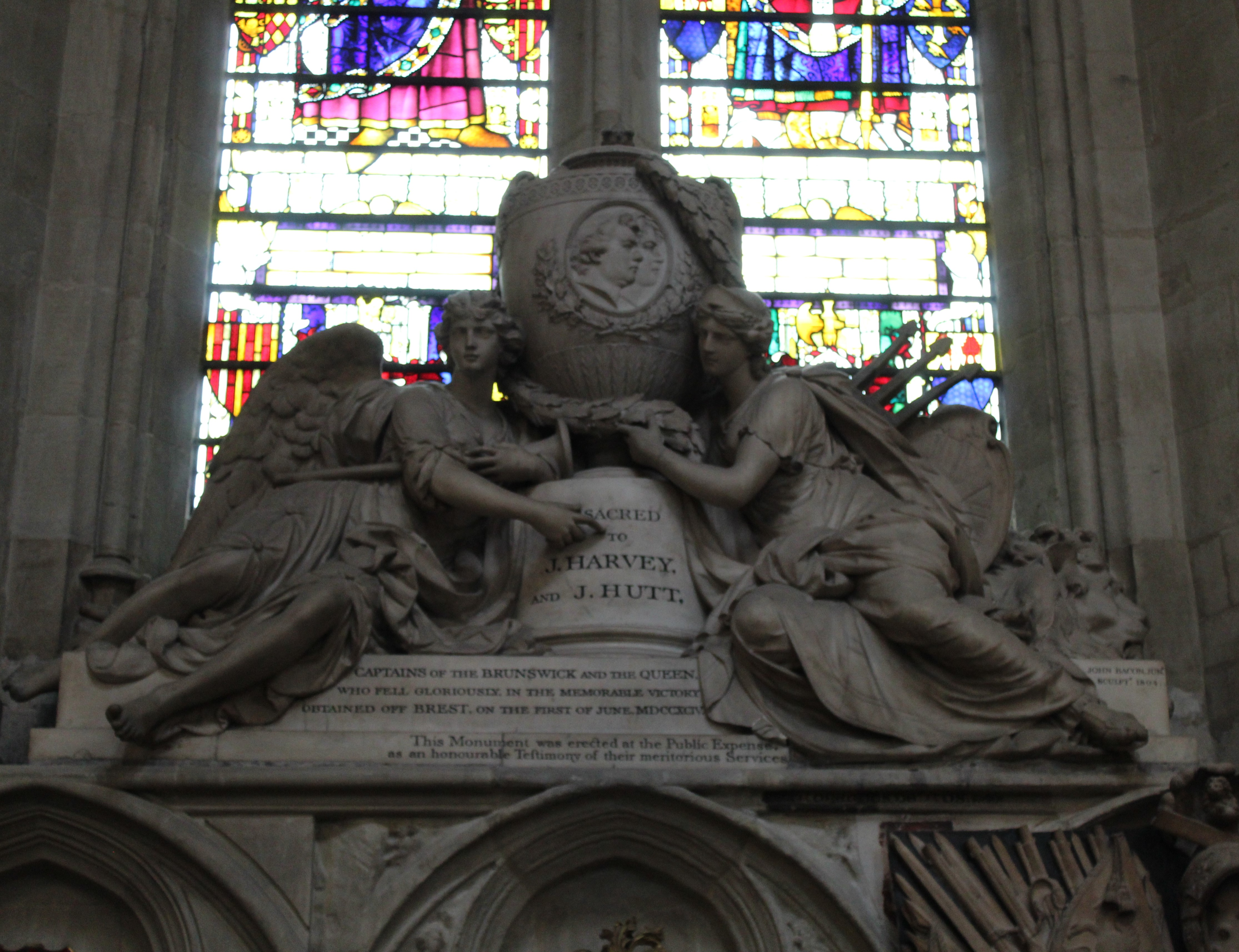
The Harvey & Hutt memorial in Westminster Abbey

In fact, although Queen was heavily engaged at the action of 1 June 1794, Hutt was in no position to command her. On 29 May, as the fleets manoeuvered into position for the main engagement, the French fleet attempting to draw the British away from the convoy, Queen exchanged shots with a number of French ships. The engagement was inconclusive but Hutt was grievously wounded by a cannonball that took off one of his legs. During the main engagement four days later, Hutt was below decks in the ship's sick bay.

Hutt was landed at Spithead a few days after the battle and, despite his serious injury, doctors indicated that he was likely to make a full recovery. Unfortunately, a few days later, infection set into the wound and Hutt died on 30 June 1794 as a result. Along with John Harvey who had died of wounds on the same day as Hutt, and James Montagu, who had been killed at the height of the action, Hutt's name was inscribed on a large memorial in Westminster Abbey in London and the Houses of Parliament gave thanks to those captains who had died in the action.
