= USS Ontario =

USS Ontario may refer to the following ships of the United States Navy:

- USS Ontario (1812) was a lake schooner in the United States Navy during the War of 1812
- USS Ontario (1813) was a 16-gun rated sloop-of-war in the United States Navy during the years following the War of 1812
- A Java-class steam frigate was laid down in 1863 as Ontario, renamed New York in 1869, and sold while still on the stocks, in 1888
- Another Ontario was launched in 1908, decommissioned 7 April 1913, converted into a repair ship and renamed Prometheus in 1914
- USS Ontario (AT-13) was a single screw seagoing tugboat commissioned in 1912 and served until 1946

== See also ==
- Ontario (disambiguation)
- HMS Ontario
- HMCS Ontario
