= HMS Laforey =

There are two ships of the Royal Navy that have borne the name HMS Laforey, after Admiral Sir Francis Laforey:

- HMS Laforey (1913) was a Laforey-class destroyer. She was previously named HMS Florizel, but was renamed before being launched in 1913. She was sunk by a mine in 1917.
- HMS Laforey (G99) was an L-class destroyer, launched in 1941 and sunk in 1944.
