= John Laforey =

Royal Navy Admiral (1729–1796)

Admiral Sir John Laforey Bt
- Born: 1729
- Died: 14 June 1796 (aged 66–67); HMS Majestic, Atlantic Ocean
- Military career
- Allegiance: Great Britain
- Branch: Royal Navy
- Service years: 1748–1796
- Rank: Admiral
- Commands: HMS Ontario; HMS Hunter; HMS Echo; HMS Levant; HMS Pallas; HMS Ocean; HMS Invincible; Resident Commissioner Antigua; Commissioner of the Navy Leeward Islands Station; Resident Commissioner Plymouth; HMS Trusty; Leeward Islands Station
- Conflicts: Seven Years' War; Siege of Louisbourg; Siege of Quebec; Capture of Martinique; American Revolutionary War; First Battle of Ushant; Battle of the Saintes; French Revolutionary Wars; Capture of Tobago
- Awards: Baronet

Admiral Sir John Laforey, 1st Baronet (1729 – 14 June 1796) was a senior and controversial British naval officer of the 18th century whose extensive career was spent mainly on the North American and West Indian stations. During his career, Laforey was repeatedly involved in contentious naval politics, especially relating to the provision of prize money and angered several senior officers through much publicised disputes. This resulted in his sidelining for much of his career, only making flag rank and finding success with the outbreak of the French Revolutionary Wars in 1793.

== Seven Years' War ==
Laforey was born to Lieutenant-Colonel John Laforey and his wife Mary Clayton in 1729, although the actual date is unknown. The Laforey family was descended from a prominent French Huguenot line which fled to England in the 1690s and became prominent military figures within their adopted country. Nothing is known of the younger John's childhood or education but in 1748 he became a lieutenant in the Royal Navy. Seven years later, in the early stages of the Seven Years' War, Laforey was personally promoted by Commodore Augustus Keppel to commander, taking over HMS Ontario as his first commission.

Three years later, Laforey commanded HMS Hunter at the Siege of Louisbourg in French Canada under Edward Boscawen. on 25 July 1758, Laforey earned distinction in command of the small force of sailors and marines who entered the harbour and burnt the French ship of the line Prudent and captured the Bienfaisant. For this service, Laforey was rewarded by Boscawen with promotion to captain and command of HMS Echo. He continued in service under Boscawen and was present during the capture of Quebec.

By 1762, Laforey had been transferred to the West Indies under Admiral Rodney and participated in his capture of the French island of Martinique. After the peace in the same year, Laforey remained in the West Indies and married Eleanor Farley, daughter of major Antigua landowner and politician Francis Farley. Admiral Francis Laforey was their son. He would later inherit substantial estates from his father-in-law. In 1770, Laforey returned to his naval career, briefly taking over the frigate HMS Pallas. For the next six years, Laforey remained in semi-retirement until the outbreak of the American Revolutionary War in 1776 recalled him to service.

== American Revolutionary War ==
Laforey took command of the newly commissioned HMS Ocean as his first captaincy in the war, and with her served for three years, fighting at the First Battle of Ushant with the squadron of Admiral Keppel. The action was successful, but the aftermath spilled out into a bitter row coloured by party politics. Laforey, as a longtime supporter of Keppel, gave evidence for him at his court martial but Keppel left the Navy despite his acquittal and Laforey was dispatched to a temporary shore command at Antigua, commanding the Leeward Islands Station . There he established numerous reforms in the dockyard at English Harbour, improving cleaning and repair operations at the port. The commission was fraught with difficulty however as many captains and junior admirals refused to respond to Laforey's orders as he was of lower rank than they were. This substantially hindered operations on Antigua until Admiral Rodney promoted him to Commodore in 1780 to compensate.

Less than a year after his promotion however, Laforey and Rodney fell out over the purchase of stores from St Eustatius and Laforey fell from favour. Although Rodney was replaced by Hugh Pigot the following year, the situation did not improve as Pigot, though also a supporter of Keppel, did not approve of Laforey's provisions for the fitting out and sale of captured enemy ships and the two had a public disagreement which ended with Laforey's dispatch to England, where he was made commissioner of Devonport Dockyard. He remained in this role for several years, repeatedly passed over for promotion as a consequence of the enemies he had made during his service in the West Indies.

== French Revolutionary Wars ==
In 1789, after a legal challenge and a long dispute, Laforey was granted his flag with seniority back to 1787 and was also made a baronet as compensation from friends in the Admiralty. With this promotion secured, Laforey returned to the Leeward Islands Station as commander in chief, where he was still stationed at the outbreak of the French Revolutionary Wars in 1793. Taking advantage of the confused situation of the French colonies, Laforey raised the Antigua militia and invaded and captured the French colony of Tobago in a short and highly successful campaign supported by his son Francis Laforey, a navy commander who was rewarded with a captaincy for his part in the operation. In July Laforey was in England but he returned to the Leeward Islands Station with the rank a full admiral in 1795.

Arriving in the Leeward Islands once more, Laforey commanded the force which captured the Dutch colonies of Demerara, Essequibo, and Berbice. He also presided over the forces which fought in the Second Carib War and suppressed Fédon's rebellion along with an uprising in Dominica. In early 1796, Laforey laid plans for an invasion of Saint Lucia, but his deteriorating health prompted his replacement in that year by Sir Hugh Christian. Taking passage on HMS Majestic back to England, Laforey died en route of Yellow Fever and was buried at Portsmouth upon arrival. Laforey's son Francis was later an admiral in his own right and fought as captain of HMS Spartiate at the Battle of Trafalgar. He inherited his father's estates and baronetcy but died without issue in 1835.

== Notes ==
Military offices
Preceded by Sir William Parker	Commander-in-Chief, Leeward Islands Station; 1789–1793	Succeeded by Alan Gardner
Preceded by Benjamin Caldwell	Commander-in-Chief, Leeward Islands Station; 1795–1796	Succeeded by Sir Hugh Christian
Baronetage of Great Britain
New creation	Baronet (of Whitby); 1789–1796	Succeeded by Francis Laforey
