= Buller baronets of Churston Court (1790) =

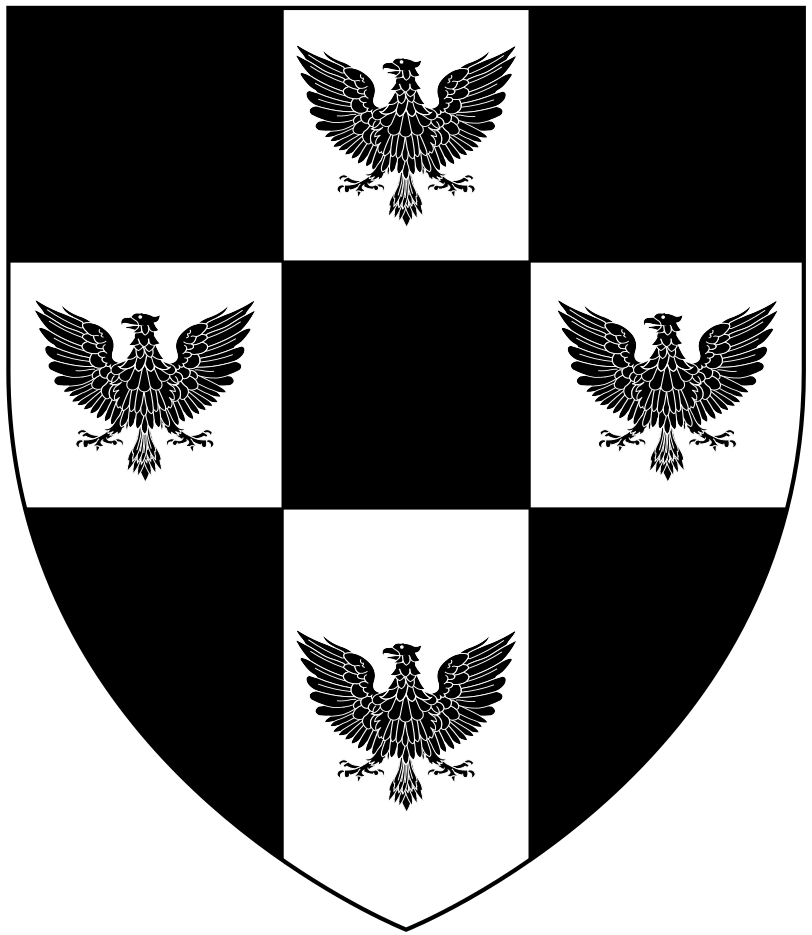
Escutcheon of the Buller baronets of Churston Court

The Buller baronetcy (later Buller-Yarde, Buller-Yarde-Buller and Yarde-Buller), of Churston Court, Devon, was created in the Baronetage of Great Britain on 13 January 1790 for Francis Buller, a judge of the Court of the King's Bench.

The 2nd Baronet served as Member of Parliament for Totnes from 1790 to 1796, and assumed by Royal licence the additional surname of Yarde in 1800. The 3rd Baronet, Sir John Yarde-Buller, was created Baron Churston in 1858, with which title the baronetcy remains united.

== Buller (later Buller-Yarde, Buller-Yarde-Buller and Yarde-Buller), of Churston Court (1790) ==
- Sir Francis Buller, 1st Baronet (1746–1800)
- Sir Francis Buller-Yarde-Buller, 2nd Baronet (1767–1833)
- Sir John Yarde-Buller, 3rd Baronet (1799–1871) (created Baron Churston in 1858)

For later succession see Baron Churston.

== Notes ==
Baronetage of Great Britain
Preceded by Laforey baronets	Buller baronets of Churston Court; 13 January 1790	Succeeded by Oakeley baronets
