= Laforey baronets =

British hereditary title

Escutcheon of the Laforey baronets of Whitby (1789)

The Laforey baronetcy, of Whitby in the County of Devon, was a title in the Baronetage of Great Britain. It was created on 2 December 1789 for the Royal Navy officer John Laforey, that year made Commander in Chief in the Leeward Islands.

He was succeeded by his son, the 2nd Baronet, a naval officer who became Admiral of the Blue in 1835. He did not marry, and the title became extinct on his death in 1835.

== Laforey baronets, of Whitby (1789) ==
- Sir John Laforey, 1st Baronet (c. 1729–1796)
- Sir Francis Laforey, 2nd Baronet (1767–1835)

Baronetage of Great Britain
Preceded by Miller baronets	Laforey baronets of Whitby; 2 December 1789	Succeeded by Buller baronets
