= Ontario Township =

Ontario Township may refer to:

- Ontario Township, Knox County, Illinois
- Ontario Township, Ramsey County, North Dakota, in Ramsey County, North Dakota
- Ontario Township, Hand County, South Dakota, in Hand County, South Dakota

== See also ==
- List of townships in Ontario
