= HMS Carysfort (1766) =

Coventry-class Royal Navy frigate

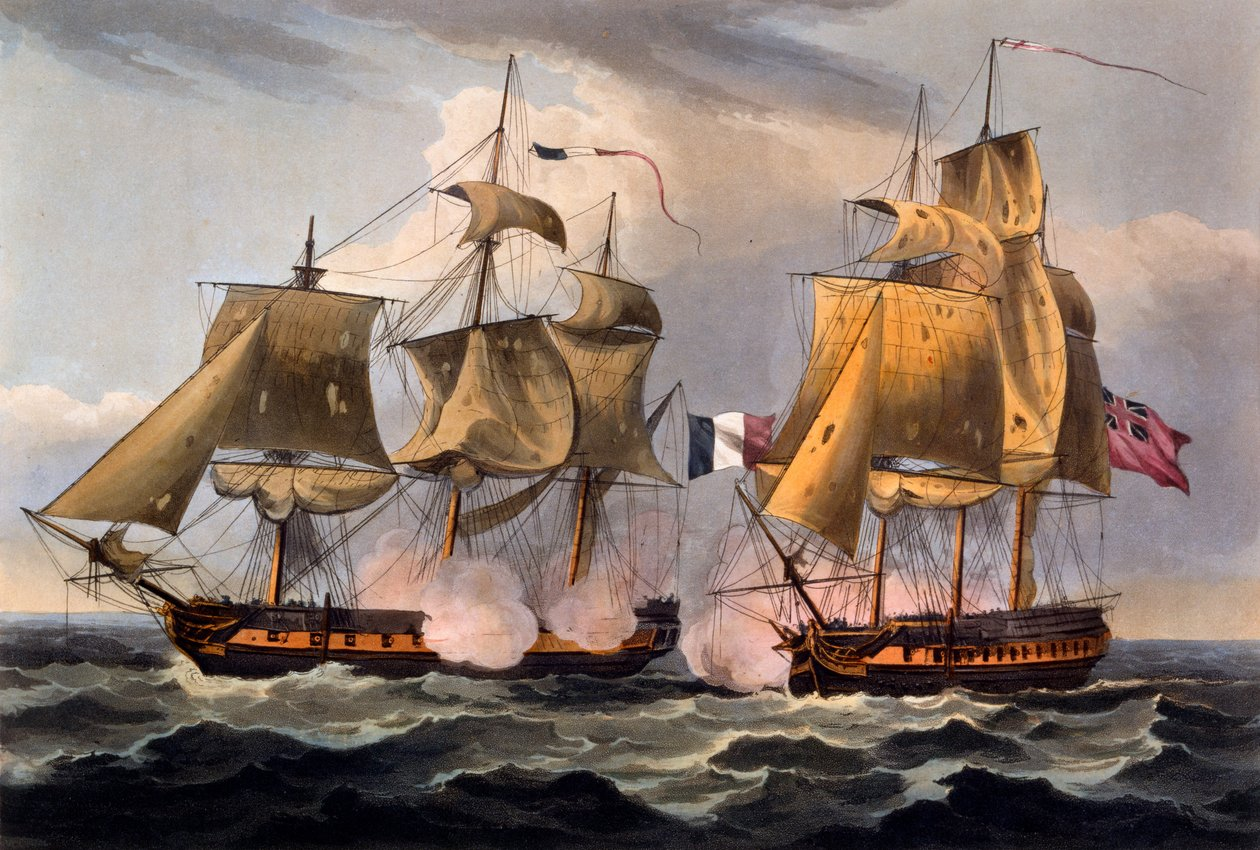
- Print by Thomas Whitcombe depicting Carysfort retaking Castor from the French on 29 May 1794

History

Great Britain
- Name: HMS Carysfort
- Namesake: John Proby, 1st Baron Carysfort, former Lord of the Admiralty
- Ordered: 4 & 20 February 1764
- Builder: Sheerness Dockyard
- Laid down: June 1764
- Launched: 23 August 1766
- Completed: 11 August 1767
- Commissioned: June 1767
- Honours and awards: Naval General Service Medal with clasp "Carysfort 29 May 1794"
- Fate: Sold on 28 April 1813

General characteristics
- Class & type: 28-gun Coventry-class sixth-rate frigate
- Tons burthen: 58630/94 (bm)
- Length: 118 ft 4 in (36.1 m) (overall); 97 ft 3 1/2 in (29.7 m) (keel)
- Beam: 33 ft 8 in (10.3 m)
- Depth of hold: 10 ft 6 in (3.20 m)
- Sail plan: Full-rigged ship
- Complement: 200
- Armament: As built: Gun deck: 24 × 9-pounder guns; QD: 4 × 3-pounder guns; 12 × 1/2-pdr swivel guns; From 1780: Gun deck: 24 × 9-pounder guns; QD: 4 × 6-ppounder guns & 4 × 18-pounder carronades; Fc: 2 × 18-pounder carronades; From 1794: Upper deck: 24 × 9-pounder guns; QD: 4 × 6-pounder guns & 4 × 24-pounder carronades; Fc: 2 × 24-pounder carronades

HMS Carysfort was a 28-gun Coventry-class sixth-rate frigate of the Royal Navy. She served during the American War of Independence, the French Revolutionary and the Napoleonic Wars in a career that spanned over forty years.

She had a number of notable commanders during this period, and saw action in several single-ship actions against French and American opponents. She took several privateers during the American War of Independence, though one of her most notable actions was the recapture of Castor, a Royal Navy frigate that a French squadron had captured nearly three weeks earlier and a French prize crew was sailing to France. Carysfort engaged and forced the surrender of her larger opponent, restoring Castor to the British, though not without a controversy over the issue of prize money. Carysfort spent the later French Revolutionary and early Napoleonic Wars on stations in the East and later the West Indies. Carysfort returned to Britain in 1806 where she was laid up in ordinary. The Admiralty finally sold her in 1813.

== Construction and commissioning ==
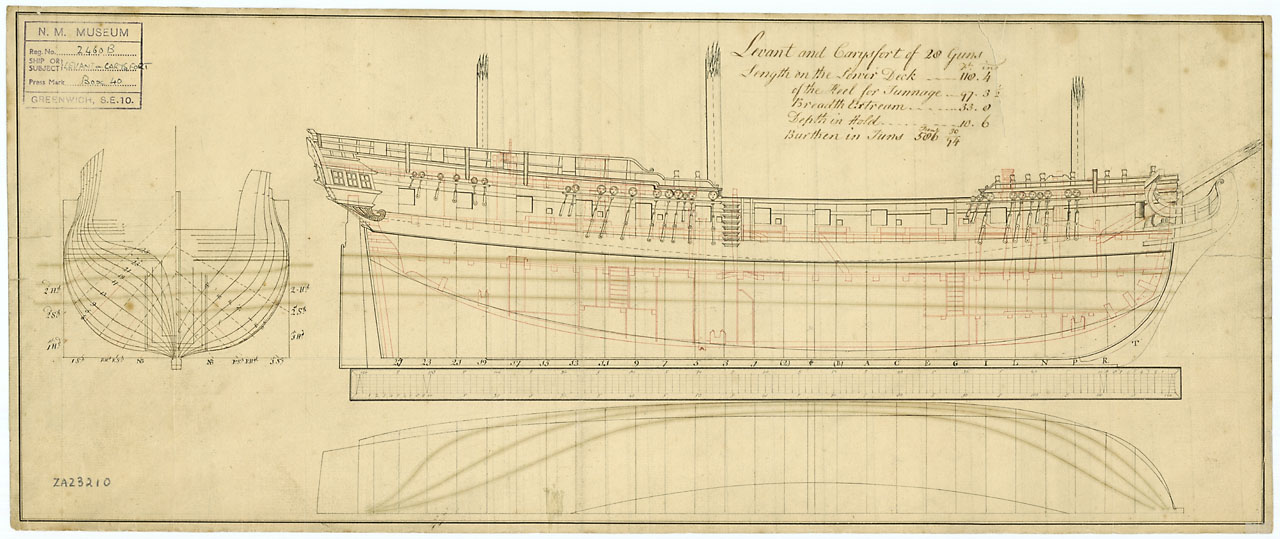
Plan of HMS Carysfort

The Admiralty ordered Carysfort from Sheerness Dockyard in February 1764 and laid down there in June that year. Master shipwright John Williams oversaw her construction until June 1765, and William Gray took over until her completion. She was named on 29 July 1765 and launched on 23 August 1766. She was completed by 11 August 1767, after the expenditure of £11,101 14s 11d to build, plus £1,614 13s 3d on fitting her out.

== Early years and American War of Independence ==
Carysfort commissioned under her first commander, Captain George Vandeput in June 1767, and sailed for the Mediterranean in September that year. Vandeput remained in command until 1770, when in February Captain William Hay replaced him. Hay continued in the Mediterranean until May, when he sailed to Jamaica. On that trip she ran aground in the Straits of Florida. Carysfort Reef there is named for her.

Hay and Carysfort briefly returned to Britain in 1771, before journeying back to Jamaica in April 1772. She was paid off in July 1773 and spent some time laid up.

Carysfort began to be fitted for foreign service at Chatham Dockyard in September 1775, a process that had been completed by February 1776. She was then recommissioned in December 1775 under Captain Robert Fanshawe. Fanshawe sailed to North America in April 1776, but returned the following year where she was again fitted out, this time at Plymouth.

She captured the merchant schooner Rachael om 15 January 1778, off Charles Town, South Carolina, and scuttled her. On 21 January she, along with Perseus and HMS Lizard, captured the French ship Bourbon off Edisto Island, South Carolina. On 27 January she and Lizard captured the French brig 'Flambeau" 19 miles off Charles Town, South Carolina. On 28 January she and Lizard captured French sloop 'Notre Dame des Charmes" 19 miles off Charles Town, South Carolina. On 29 January, 1778 she captured an unidentified schooner off Charles Town and destroyed it. On 1 February she and HMS Lizard captured Dutch brig "Batavear" off the mouth of the Santee River, South Carolina. On 2 February she captured French snow "Lenore" (or Lanoir) off Charles Town. On 15 March, 1778 captured French sloop "Reynard" off Charles Town. On 28 March she captured Spanish ship "Nuestra Senora del Carmel" 3 leagues off Charles Town, the vessel was recaptured by a privateer later. She captured a prize on 15 April 1778, off Saint Helena Island, South Carolina.

In September 1778, again in service in North America with Captain Fanshawe, she transported troops on a raiding expedition led by Major General Charles Grey. She paid off again in late 1778, but in late 1779 she was reactivated and began to be fitted for service in the English Channel. She joined the Downs squadron under her new captain, William Cumming, and on 13 June 1780 she captured the privateer Espérance. Cumming was replaced in November 1780 by Captain William Peacock, and in December Carysfort returned to operate in North American waters. On 24 May 1782 she captured the American privateer General Galvez. Captain John Markham briefly took command in December 1782, and next month Carysfort was paid off again.

== Interwar period and French Revolutionary Wars ==
Carysfort underwent a great repair in mid-1785, and returned to service in January 1787, having commissioned the previous month under Captain Matthew Smith. She served in the Mediterranean for three years, paying off in 1790. After a further period spent laid up, Carysfort was prepared for active service again after the outbreak of the French Revolutionary Wars, and recommissioned in August 1793 under Captain Francis Laforey.

=== Carysfort and Castor ===
While off Land's End on 29 May 1794 she came across Castor, sailing under French colours. The Castor, originally under Captain Thomas Troubridge, had been captured twenty days earlier by a French squadron under Joseph-Marie Nielly during the Atlantic campaign of May 1794. Castor was being sailed back to France by a French prize crew at the time she was discovered, and was towing a Dutch brig. The French cast off the brig and fought Carysfort for an hour and a quarter, before surrendering. Carysfort's casualties amounted to one dead and four wounded, while the French in Castor had 16 killed and nine wounded. One master's mate and eighteen seaman of the original crew were released after the recapture, but Troubridge and most of the British crew had been taken aboard Nielly's flagship, Sans Pareil, and would have to wait for the defeat of the French fleets at the Glorious First of June and the capture of Sans Pareil before they could be freed.

Carysfort towed Castor to a British port, but a dispute then arose over the matter of prize money. The naval commissioners decided that since Castor was being taken to a French port, she was not yet a French warship, and that Carysfort had merely recovered the British ship. This meant Laforey and his crew were entitled to some salvage rights, but not the more lucrative bounty of prize money. Laforey protested and the case went to Sir James Marriott, the judge of the High Court of Admiralty. The captured French captain was called upon to give evidence, and reported that Nielly was empowered to 'condemn, arm, fit-out, and equip, all such prizes as he might think calculated for the service of the French republic.' Marriott determined that Castor fulfilled the criteria of such a ship, and therefore awarded her full value to Laforey and the men of Carysfort. Also, in 1847 the men of Carysfort were authorized the Naval General Service Medal with the clasp "Carysfort 29 May 1794"; however, none came forward to claim theirs.

== French Revolutionary Wars ==
Captain John Murray took command of Carysfort in 1795, and left Britain for the East Indies in February 1796. Carysfort remained in the East Indies for the next few years, passing under the command of Captain Thomas Alexander in March 1796. On 19 August that year Alexander captured the 16-gun French corvette Alerte, a privateer requisitioned by the French government. She sailed from France for the East Indies with the squadron under Admiral Sercey. There Sercey sent her to visit the Danish post at Trinquebar to gather information about the disposition of the British navy in the East Indies. On his way the captain encountered Carysfort in the dark, and mistaking her for a merchant vessel, attacked. Carysfort captured Alerte, and with her, papers describing Sercey's plans and route. This led on 9 September to an indecisive action between Sercey's squadron and Arrogant and Victorious.

In December Captain John Turnor succeeded Murray. Turnor was replaced by Captain William Hills in 1798, and he by Captain Volant Vashon Ballard in December 1798. He remained with her until mid-1800. Between April and June 1801 Carysfort was at Portsmouth undergoing fitting.

Captain Adam Drummond (later Vice Admiral of the Red) assumed command of Carysfort in 18 May 1801. Carysfort and Argo escorted five transports carrying the 85th Regiment of Foot and forty artillerymen from Cowes on 24 June. They arrived in Portsmouth on 28 June and then sailed again on a "secret mission". They had to put back into Torbay on 11 July.

The secret mission saw Carysfort spending several months off Madeira during the British occupation. She returned from Madeira on 2 September.

Carysfort sailed again on 26 January 1802 on an anti-smuggling patrol and returned on 26 February. Drummond paid Carysfort off in May 1802. His replacement was Captain George Mundy in May 1802.

In June she participated in a small anti-smuggling squadron under the command of Captain King of Sirius. The other vessels in the squadron were Rosario, Imogen, and Peterell. On the 11th, the vessels were ordered to embark victuals for two months. They were cruise from Berry Head to Mount's Bay, an area "infested with smugglers".

Captain Robert Fanshawe replaced Mundy in September 1802, only to be superseded by Captain John Woolcombe.

== Napoleonic Wars ==
On 26 March 1804, she sailed from Cork with a convoy of sixty-seven merchantmen, together with Apollo. After departure, the convoy immediately encountered a strong gale and errors in navigation by dead reckoning led them to believe they had sailed out into the Atlantic. At 03:00 in the morning of 2 April Apollo unexpectedly ran aground on a shoal about nine miles south of Cape Mondego on the coast of Portugal. Soon after, 26 of the other vessels in the convoy, traveling closely behind due to the low visibility and bad weather, were also wrecked. In all, 29 vessels ran aground. Carysfort had shifted course on the evening of 1 April further offshore and so escaped grounding. She gathered the 38 surviving vessels and proceeded with the convoy. They sailed westwards to Funchal in Maderia on 4 April and the Master of the ship correctly determined their position, measuring some 138 miles of error to where Apollo and the convoy had thought they had been.

Carysfort sailed to Jamaica in March 1804, and came under Captain Kenneth McKenzie in March 1806. In July 1806 Captain Philip Carteret of Scorpion helped McKenzie save sixty-five deeply laden merchantmen from destruction at St. Kitts. Carteret sent a letter to the Governor at Nevis who warned McKenzie that a French squadron under Admiral Willaumez had arrived at Martinique. Carysfort and the armed storeship Dolphin sailed leeward with their charges and so escaped the French, who had sailed from Fort Royal on 1 July. The French squadron succeeded in capturing three merchantmen at Montserrat and another three and a brig at Nevis; the fort on Brimstone Hill (St. Kitt's) and a battery on the beach protected nine others that had missed the convoy, though the French did attack them.

McKenzie took the Lutine in the West Indies on 24 March after a 30-hour chase, after Edward Berry's Agamemnon came up and blocked her escape. Lutine was a new French navy brig with a crew of 100 men under the command of M. Croquet Dechauteurs. She was 33 days out of Lorient and on her way to Martinique, but had captured nothing on her way. She was armed with 18 guns but had thrown two overboard during the chase. Berry reported that "she is a remarkably fine Vessel, quite new,... , is well appointed in every Respect; sails uncommonly fast, and is, in my Opinion, well calculated for His Majesty's Service." The Navy concurred and took Lutine into service as HMS Hawk.

== Fate ==
Carysfort returned to Britain later in 1806 and was laid up at Deptford in August. Five years later she was sold for £1,800 on 28 April 1813.
