= HMS Queen (1769) =

British ship of the line (1769–1821)

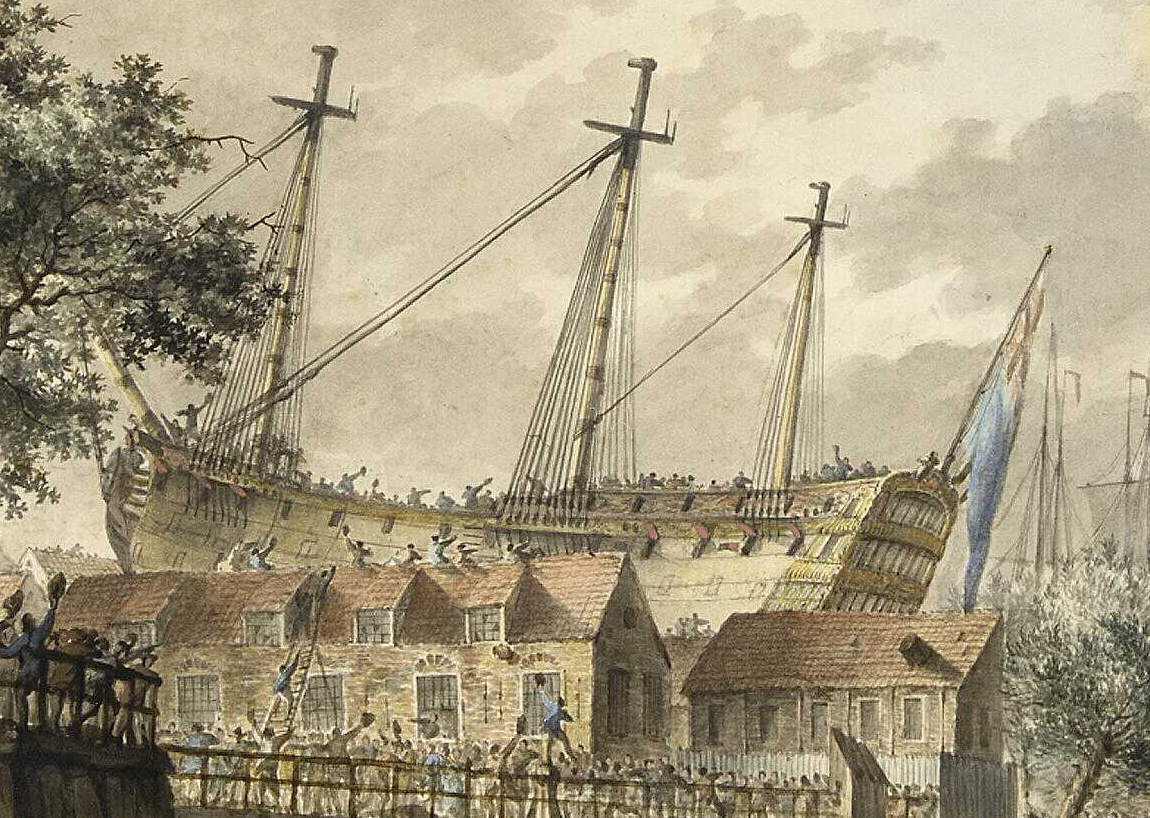
- Queen's launch on 18 September 1769

History

Great Britain
- Name: HMS Queen
- Ordered: 10 November 1761
- Builder: Woolwich Dockyard
- Launched: 18 September 1769
- Honours and awards: Participated in: First Battle of Ushant; Second Battle of Ushant; Battle of Cape Spartel; Glorious First of June
- Fate: Broken up 1821

General characteristics
- Class & type: 90-gun second rate ship of the line
- Tons burthen: 1876 (bm)
- Length: 177 ft 6 in (54.1 m) (gundeck)
- Beam: 49 ft 6 in (15.1 m)
- Depth of hold: 21 ft 9 in (6.6 m)
- Propulsion: Sails
- Sail plan: Full-rigged ship
- Armament: Gundeck: 28 × 32-pounder guns; Middle gundeck: 30 × 18-pounder guns; Upper gundeck: 30 × 12-pounder guns; Forecastle: 2 × 9-pounder guns

HMS Queen was a three-deck 90-gun second-rate ship of the line of the Royal Navy, launched on 18 September 1769 at Woolwich Dockyard. She was designed by William Bateley, and was the only ship built to her draught. Her armament was increased to 98 guns in the 1780s.

== Service ==
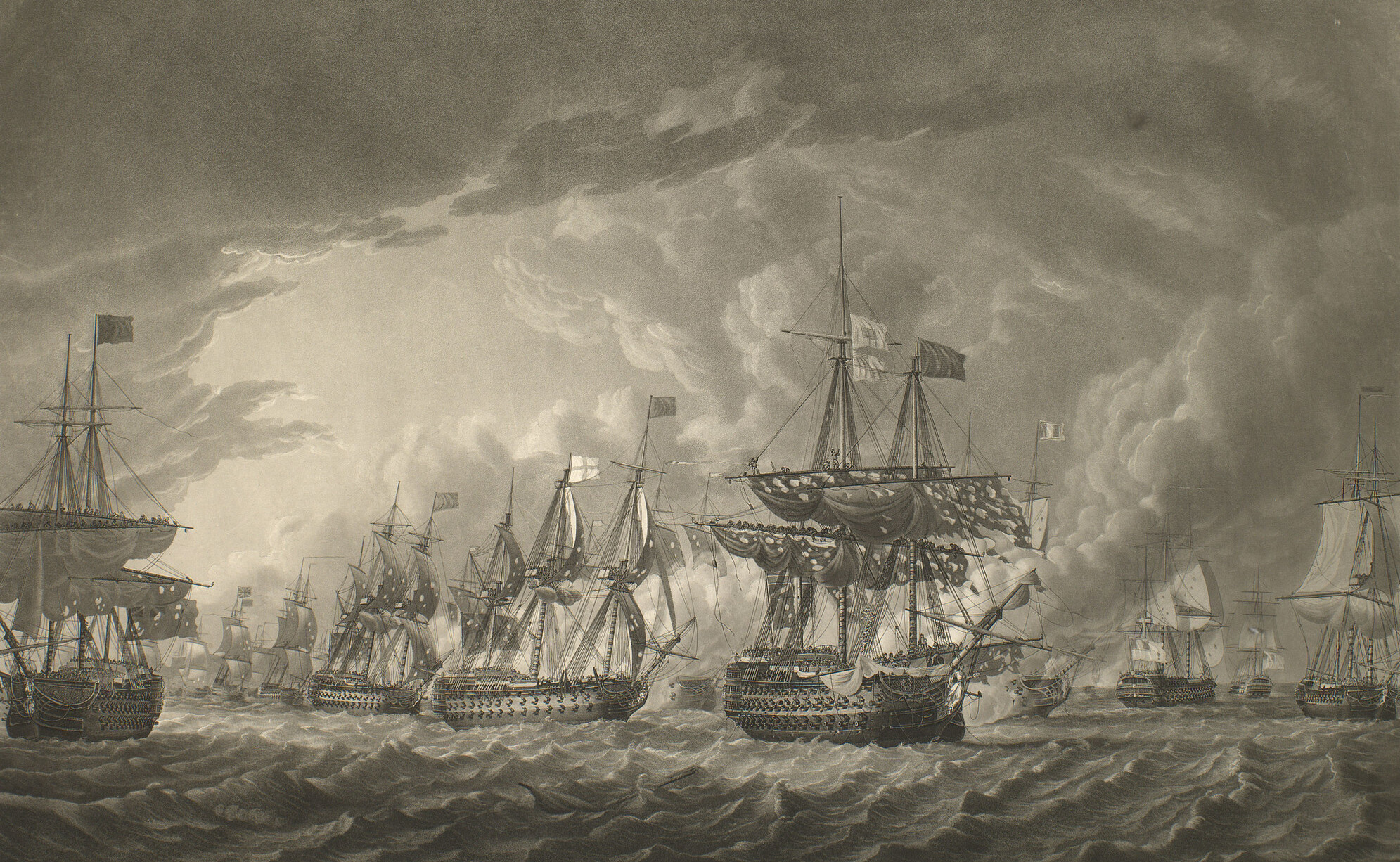
Queen shown in the preliminary action that led, two days later, to the battle of the Glorious First of June

Queen fought at the First Battle of Ushant under Keppel in 1778, and the Second Battle of Ushant under Kempenfelt in 1781. In 1794 she fought in the Glorious First of June under Howe, where she served as Rear-Admiral Alan Gardner's flagship. During the battle Queen sustained significant damage, and her commanding officer, Captain John Hutt, was amongst those killed.

On 16 November 1798, the squadron she was in captured three US merchantmen, Norfolk, Eliza, and Friendship, under convoy of USS Baltimore; the squadron impressed five of Baltimore{'}s crew. At the time she was under command of Capt. Dobson. She was still Captained by Dobson when she contacted USS Ganges while on a cruise on 3 April 1800.

For some of the period between 1798 and 1802, she was under the command of Captain Theophilus Jones.

On 10 March 1800, USS Constellation made contact with her, HMS Castor and HMS Amphion at approximately (23°35′N 83°19′W).

After the Battle of Trafalgar on 21 October 1805, Queen continued in the blockade of Cadiz. On 25 November, Thunderer detained the Ragusan ship Nemesis, which was sailing from Isle de France to Leghorn, Italy, with a cargo of spice, indigo dye, and other goods. Queen shared the prize money with ten other British warships.

On 25 October 1806, the Spanish privateer Generalísimo captured HM gunboat Hannah, which was serving as a tender to Queen.

After Trafalgar, the demand for the large three-decker first and second rates diminished. Consequently, in 1811 the Admiralty had Queen razeed to become a two-decker third rate of 74 guns.

== Fate ==
Queen was eventually broken up in 1821, at the age of 52.
