= HMS Ontario (1780) =

Snow of the Royal Navy

Coordinates: 43.455°N 78.339°W

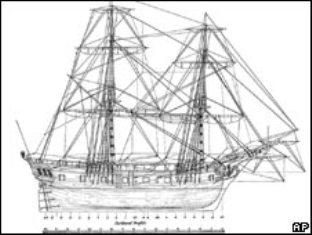
- Ontario

History

Great Britain
- Name: HMS Ontario
- Namesake: Lake Ontario
- Owner: Provincial Marine
- Operator: Royal Navy
- Builder: Carleton Island Dockyard
- Laid down: October 1779
- Launched: 10 May 1780
- Fate: 31 October 1780 sank in Lake Ontario during a storm
- Status: Shipwreck discovered in June, 2008 at more than 500 ft (150 m) depth

General characteristics
- Class & type: Sixth rate
- Tons burthen: 226 tons
- Length: 80 ft (24 m)
- Beam: 25 ft (7.6 m)
- Sail plan: Two-masted snow
- Complement: 130 believed lost
- Armament: 22 cannons

HMS Ontario was a 22-gun snow of the Royal Navy that sank in a storm in Lake Ontario on 31 October 1780 during the American Revolutionary War. At 80 feet (24 m) in length, she was largest British warship on the Great Lakes at the time. The shipwreck was discovered in 2008. Ontario was found largely intact and very well preserved in the cold water. The wreck discoverers asserted that "the 80-foot sloop of war is the oldest shipwreck and the only fully intact British warship ever found in the Great Lakes."

== History ==
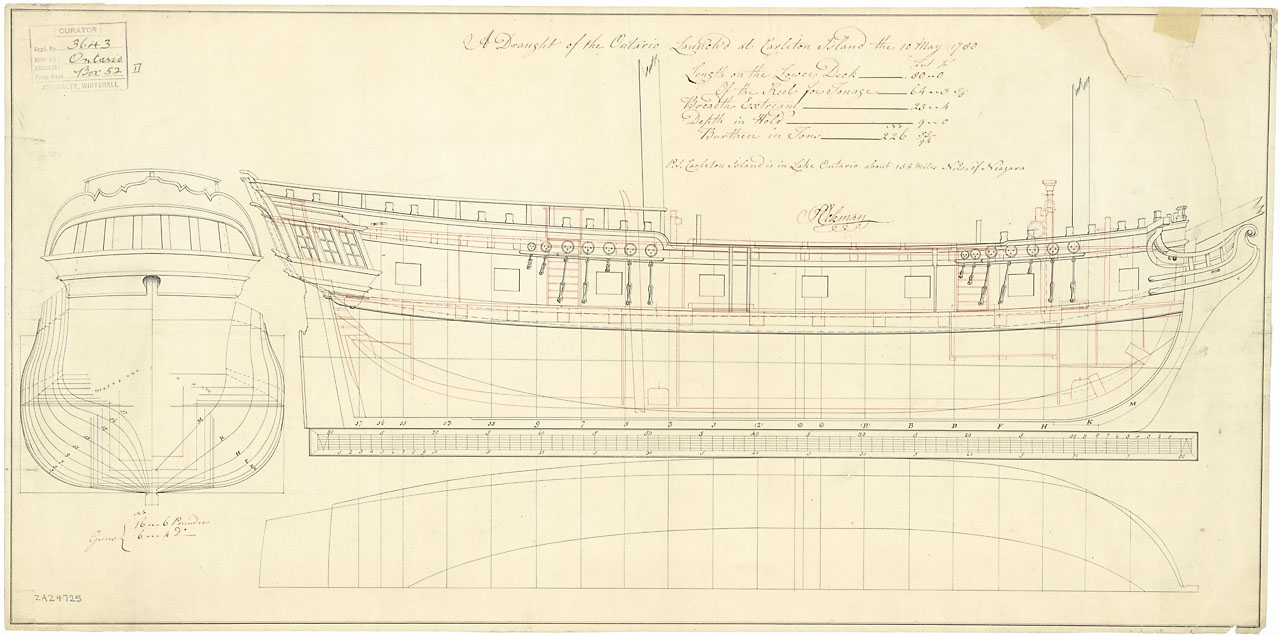
Original plan for the Ontario from 1780

Ontario was built in 1780 on Carleton Island, a major base in the St Lawrence River for the British during the Revolutionary War, but now part of New York. She was operated by the Royal Navy for the Provincial Marine in the capacity of an armed transport.

At the time, Ontario was the largest British warship to sail on the Great Lakes. She was launched just five months before she sank, and was used to ferry troops, supplies and prisoners from one remote part of New York to another. She never saw battle.

== Sinking ==
Ontario sank in a storm on 31 October 1780 while underway from Fort Niagara to Oswego. Approximately 80 men perished with the ship, comprising an estimated 31 sailors (two of whom were officers), three members of the Royal Artillery (one being an officer), three privates and one officer of the 8th (King's) Regiment of Foot, 30 men of the 34th (Cumberland) Regiment of Foot (one being an officer, two serjeants, one corporal, one drummer and 30 privates), two rangers, one passenger and four Native Americans. News of the sinking of Ontario was kept quiet for a number of years to hide the naval loss.

== Search and discovery ==
Side-scan sonar technology was used in the search of HMS Ontario in late May 2008. A promising wreck was found between Niagara and Rochester, New York in an area of Lake Ontario where the depth exceeds 492 feet (150 m). The sonar imagery clearly showed a large sailing ship resting upright at an angle, with two masts reaching up at least 70 feet (21 m) above the bottom of the lake. The high resolution images showed the remains of two fighting tops, one on each mast, strongly suggesting that the sunken vessel was the brig-sloop Ontario. Due to the depth limitations for diving on this shipwreck, a remotely operated underwater vehicle was deployed and confirmed the identity of the ship in early June 2008.

Kennard and Scoville believe that the cold, fresh water of Lake Ontario, combined with a lack of light and oxygen, have slowed decomposition and account for the ship being found largely intact, despite being on the bottom for 230 years. The shipwreck's discoverers have notified the New York State Office of Historic Preservation, however the exact location of the wreck has not been publicly disclosed. The wreck is still property of the United Kingdom and is a war grave.

== See also ==
- Land Tortoise (shipwreck), a well-preserved older shipwreck in Lake George
