= HMS Castor (1785) =

Frigate of the Royal Navy

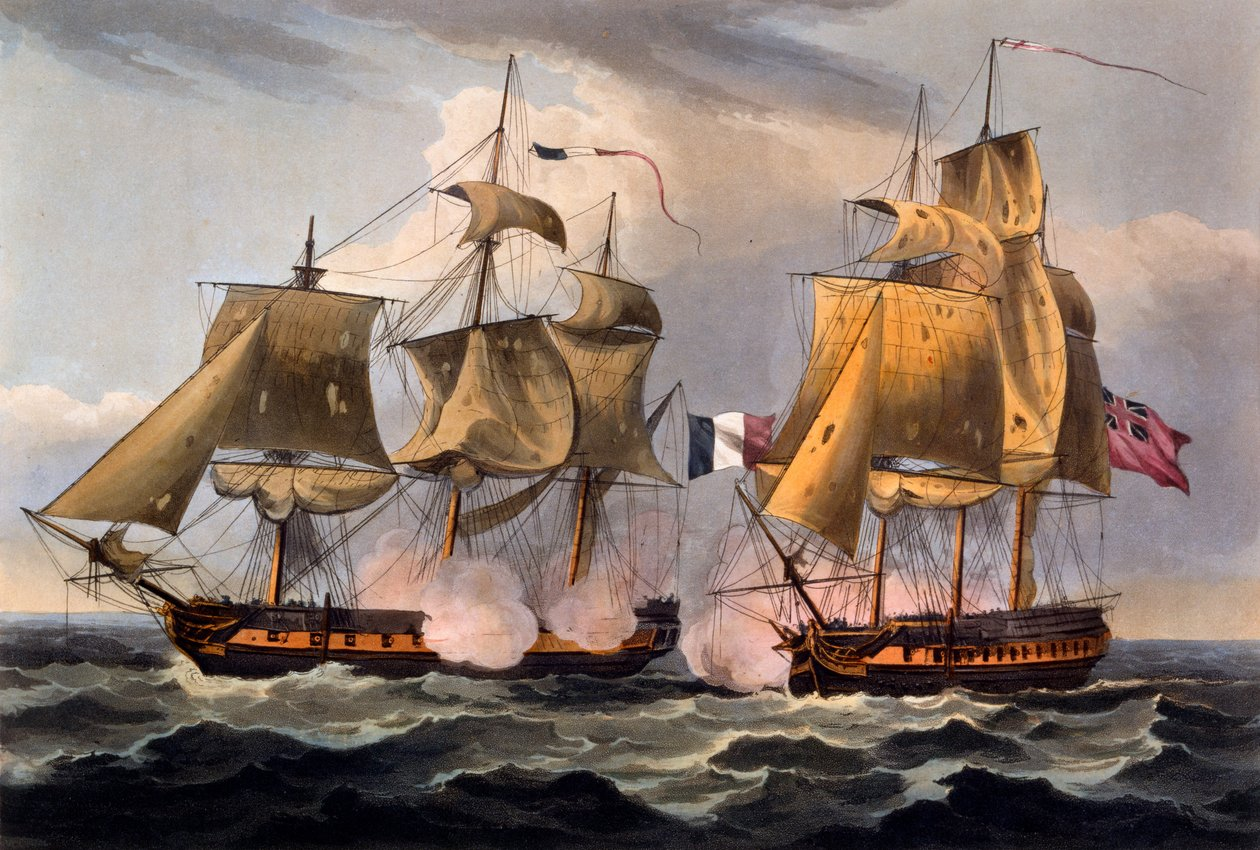
- Print by Thomas Whitcombe depicting HMS Carysfort retaking Castor from the French on 29 May 1794

History

Great Britain
- Name: HMS Castor
- Ordered: 30 January 1782
- Builder: Joseph Graham, Harwich
- Laid down: January 1783
- Launched: 26 May 1785
- Completed: 11 July 1786
- Fate: Sold on 22 July 1819

General characteristics
- Class & type: 32-gun Amazon-class fifth-rate frigate
- Tons burthen: 680 (bm)
- Length: 126 ft (38.4 m) (overall); 104 ft (31.7 m) (keel)
- Beam: 35 ft 1 in (10.7 m)
- Draught: 9 ft (2.74 m)
- Depth of hold: 12 ft 2 in (3.71 m)
- Sail plan: Full-rigged ship
- Complement: 220
- Armament: As built: UD: 26 × 12-pounder guns; QD: 4 × 6-pounder guns + 4 × 18-pounder carronades; Fc: 2 × 6-pounder guns + 2 × 18-pounder carronades; After 1809: UD: 22 × 32-pounder carronades; QD: 2 × 6-pounder guns + 4 × 32-pounder carronades; Fc: 2 × 12-pounder guns + 2 × 32-pounder carronades

HMS Castor was a 32-gun Amazon-class fifth-rate frigate of the Royal Navy. She served during the French Revolutionary and Napoleonic Wars. The French briefly captured her during the Atlantic Campaign of May 1794 but she spent just 20 days in French hands as a British ship retook her before her prize crew could reach a French port. Castor eventually saw service in many of the theatres of the wars, spending time in the waters off the British Isles, in the Mediterranean and Atlantic, as well as the Caribbean.

== Construction and commissioning ==
Castor was ordered on 30 January 1782 and laid down in January the following year at the yards of the shipbuilder Joseph Graham, of Harwich. She was launched on 26 May 1785 and completed by July the following year. The ship was then laid up in ordinary at Chatham Dockyard.

== Career ==
=== Early years ===
Castor spent nearly five years in ordinary until the Spanish Armament of 1790 caused her to be fitted out at Chatham between June and August 1790 for the sum of £2,795. She commissioned in July that year under Captain John S. Smith, but the easing of international tensions caused Castor to be paid off later that year. The rising tensions with France immediately prior to the outbreak of the French Revolutionary Wars led the Admiralty to again prepare Castor for active service. She was fitted at Chatham between February and April 1793 for £4,066, recommissioning that February under Captain Thomas Troubridge.

=== French Revolutionary Wars and capture ===
Troubridge sailed for the Mediterranean on 22 May 1793, where in June she and HMS Mermaid captured a 14-gun privateer. Castor was then part of Admiral Hood's fleet at Toulon. While Castor was escorting a convoy back to Britain, on 9 May 1794 a French squadron under Rear-Admiral Joseph-Marie Nielly chased and captured her off Cape Clear. A French prize crew then sailed her back towards France. Twenty days later, on 29 May, Francis Laforey's HMS Carysfort sighted Castor off Land's End and recaptured her. Castor was re-registered as a naval ship on 6 November and recommissioned in January 1795 under Captain Rowley Bulteel.

Castor was at Plymouth on 20 January 1795 and so shared in the proceeds of the detention of the Dutch naval vessels, East Indiamen, and other merchant vessels that were in port on the outbreak of war between Britain and the Netherlands.

Captain Bulteel took Castor to the Mediterranean in May 1795, but paid her off in September 1796.

Castor underwent a refit at Plymouth between November 1798 and March 1799, recommissioning under Captain Edward Leveson Gower. In March 1799 a quantity of the gunpowder stores were accidentally ignited, causing severe injury to one of Castor's midshipmen. The injured man having been replaced, Captain Gower sailed Castor to Newfoundland in April 1799. On 15 November, reportedly under the command of Capt. Fellows, she made contact with USS Connecticut off Puerto Rico reportedly. By December that year Castor was on the Spanish coast when she captured the 2-gun privateer Santa Levivate y Aninimus off Porto on Christmas Day 1799. On 10 March, 1800 USS Constellation made contact with her, HMS Queen and HMS Amphion at apx. (23°35′N 83°19′W). Captain David Lloyd took command of Castor in 1801, but he was soon succeeded by Captain Bernard Hale who sailed for the West Indies in April 1801. Hale died in 1802; his successor Captain Richard Peacocke continued to command Castor in the West Indies.

=== West Indies and Caribbean ===
Castor returned home, and was fitted out as a guardship for Liverpool between August and October 1803. She came initially under the command of Captain Edward Brace, but by April 1805 she had been moved to Sheerness, where she recommissioned under Captain Joseph Baker. She spent between 1806 and 1809 undergoing a repair and refit, before she came under the command of Captain William Roberts. On 27 March 1808 her boats, along with those of HMS Ulysses, HMS Hippomenes and HMS Morne Fortunee made an unsuccessful attempt to cut out the 16-gun French Griffon from Port Marin, Martinique.

In April 1809, a strong French squadron arrived at the Îles des Saintes, south of Guadeloupe. There they were blockaded until 14 April, when a British force under Major-General Frederick Maitland invaded and captured the islands. Castor was among the naval vessels that shared in the proceeds of the capture of the islands. (Note: The prize agent for a number of the vessels involved, Henry Abbott, went bankrupt. In May 1835 there was a final payment of a dividend from his estate. A first-class share was worth 10s 2¾d; a sixth-class share, that of an ordinary seaman, was worth 1d. Seventh-class (landsmen) and eighth-class (boys) shares were fractions of a penny, too small to pay.) Castor was next involved in the chase on 16 and 17 April 1809 of the 74-gun French ship of the line D'Hautpoul off Puerto Rico.

=== Mediterranean and final years ===
Captain Charles Dilkes took command in October 1810, and Castor spent 1811 and 1812 on the Leeward Islands and Jamaica stations. She moved to the Mediterranean in late 1812, and on 22 June 1813 captured the 2-gun privateer Fortune off the Catalan coast. She captured two other privateers, the one gun Heureux and Minute (or Minuit), off Barcelona on 22 or 25 January 1814. (Note: Head money for Minuit was finally paid in October 1832. A first-class share was worth £20 18s4d; a sixth-class share was worth 3s 9¾d.)

== Fate ==
Castor was finally laid up in August 1815 in Portsmouth at the conclusion of the Napoleonic Wars. The Admiralty sold her for breaking up on 22 July 1819 to G. Bailey for the sum of £2,650.
