= Francis Laforey =

Royal Navy Admiral (1767–1835)

Admiral Sir Francis Laforey Bt KCB
- Born: 31 December 1767; Colony of Virginia
- Died: 17 June 1835 (aged 67); Brighton, Sussex, England
- Military career
- Allegiance: Great Britain; United Kingdom
- Branch: Royal Navy
- Service years: 1780s–1835
- Rank: Admiral
- Commands: HMS Fairy; HMS Carysfort; HMS Aimable; HMS Scipio; HMS Hydra; HMS Powerful; HMS Spartiate; Leeward Islands Station
- Conflicts: French Revolutionary Wars; Frigate action of 29 May 1794; Napoleonic Wars; Battle of Trafalgar
- Awards: Knight Commander of the Order of the Bath (1815)

Admiral Sir Francis Laforey, 2nd Baronet, KCB (31 December 1767 – 17 June 1835) was an officer of the British Royal Navy during the French Revolutionary and Napoleonic Wars, whose distinguished service record included numerous frigate commands in home waters and in the West Indies. He is best known, however, for his service in command of the ship of the line Spartiate at the Battle of Trafalgar in 1805. During the action, Laforey was heavily engaged and his ship suffered heavy casualties. Five years after Trafalgar, Laforey was promoted to rear-admiral and commanded the Leeward Islands squadron, before retiring in 1814.

Son of the notable and highly controversial naval officer Sir John Laforey, Francis Laforey joined the Navy at a young age and enjoyed patronage throughout his career. His exploits in command of frigates during the French Revolutionary Wars and his capture of Dutch colonies in South America garnered wealth and esteem among his colleagues, and his later success as a battleship captain only continued this trend.

== Biography ==
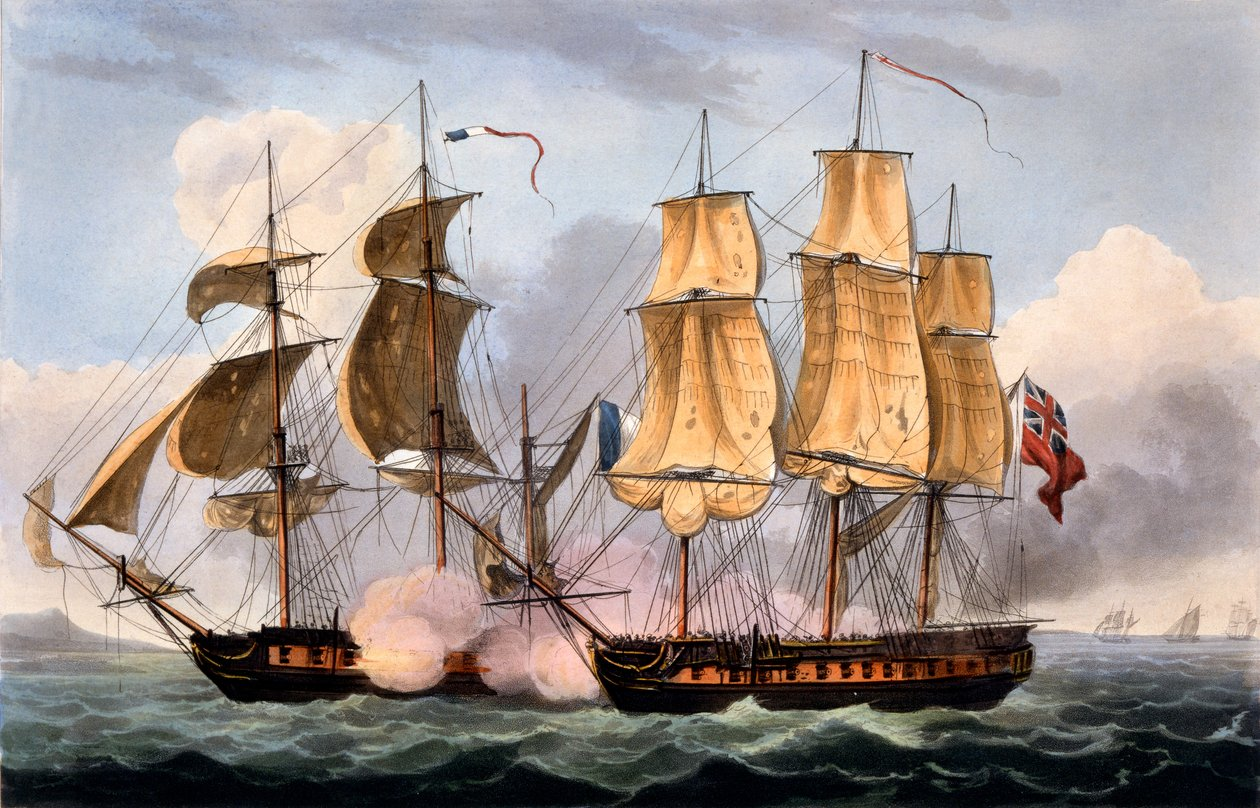
The action of 31 May 1798

Born in 1767 in Virginia into wealthy and respectable family, Laforey was destined to go to sea from an early age, his father being an officer himself, later to become Admiral Sir John Laforey, 1st Baronet of Whitby. Francis' father was a senior government official in Antigua at the time, and the family moved there soon afterwards, thus avoiding the American War of Independence, although the senior Laforey was heavily involved due to his naval duties. Sent to sea in the early 1780s as a teenager, Francis' rise was rapid due to his father's local influence, meaning that by 1791 Laforey was already a commander with his own sloop, Fairy.

At the outbreak of war in 1793, John Laforey realised the excellent opportunity the unprepared French possessions in the Caribbean made, and so marshalled local troops and volunteers and captured the island of Tobago within days. Sending his son to London with the dispatches and evidence of his success was also a very intelligent move, because Francis was then rewarded in the customary manner for such messengers of success, with a promotion to Post Captain. Francis made the most of this opportunity using his new command, the frigate Carysfort, to recapture Castor from her French captors at the frigate action of 29 May 1794. He then had to pursue a lengthy but ultimately successful lawsuit against the Admiralty for the prize money from the capture, which they had denied on very questionable technical grounds.

Fortunately, the Admiralty bore Laforey no ill will, and gave him the larger frigate Aimable in 1795, which he used to take his father back to Antigua, where he was now the military governor of the Leeward Islands. Using his position to aid his son's career, Sir John put Francis in command of the ship of the line Scipio and made him second in command of the successful invasions of Demerara, Essequibo and Berbice. Recrossing the Atlantic the following year whilst transporting his dying father back to England, Francis inherited the baronetcy halfway across and was given the frigate Hydra soon afterwards, using her with much success for two years on the French coast, before returning to the Caribbean and having further success there. In 1800 he again travelled to England, to take command of the ship of the line Powerful, which he commanded in the Baltic, Mediterranean and again in the West Indies until the Peace of Amiens.

When war was once again declared, Laforey was instructed to command Spartiate, one of Nelson's spoils from the battle of the Nile. In 1804 he joined this admiral's hunt across the Atlantic for the French fleet under Admiral Villeneuve when it arrived in the West Indies, and accompanied it back to the blockade off Cádiz, where he was embroiled in the battle of Trafalgar on 21 October 1805. The Spartiate was frustratingly trapped at the rear of Nelson's division, and was unable to reach the battle until several hours had passed. As Spartiate and her companion Minotaur arrived in battle they found themselves alone against the van squadron of Admiral Dumanoir le Pelley, consisting of the French ships Formidable, Duguay-Trouin, Scipion and Mont Blanc and the Spanish Neptuno. Such was the rate of fire the two ships put up however, that the Formidable turned and fled after taking hits, and the other three French ships followed her, leaving the Neptuno under Commodore Cayetano Valdés y Flores to sail alone against the two 74 gun ships. She was soon captured and Laforey, whose ship had only suffered 23 casualties, was well placed to aid other captains during the ensuing storm.

Spartiate was amongst those ships which returned to London for Nelson's funeral, Laforey being the flag bearer walking behind the coffin. Unlike many Trafalgar officers, Laforey remained with his ship, returning to the Mediterranean, where he participated in several blockades under Collingwood, before being made rear-admiral himself in 1810 and taking up his father's old post of naval commander in chief of the Leeward Islands Station in 1811. He returned home in 1814 and the following year was made a Knight Commander of the Order of the Bath, living in quiet retirement at Brighton until his death in 1835 as a full Admiral. He was buried in the northern extension of St Nicholas Churchyard in Brighton where his headstone (now moved from its original location and laid flat) remains. Francis Laforey never married or had children, and so the baronetcy became extinct upon his death.

== Namesakes ==
Two ships of the Royal Navy have borne the name HMS Laforey, after Admiral Sir Francis Laforey:

- HMS Laforey was a Laforey-class destroyer. She was previously named HMS Florizel, but was renamed before being launched in 1913. She was sunk by a mine in 1917.
- HMS Laforey (G99) was an L-class destroyer, launched in 1941 and sunk by a U-boat in 1944.

Military offices
Preceded by Sir Alexander Cochrane	Commander-in-Chief, Leeward Islands Station; 1811–1814	Succeeded by Sir Philip Durham
Baronetage of Great Britain
Preceded by John Laforey	Baronet (of Whitby); 1796–1835	Extinct
