= State funeral of Horatio Nelson =

1806 ceremony in London

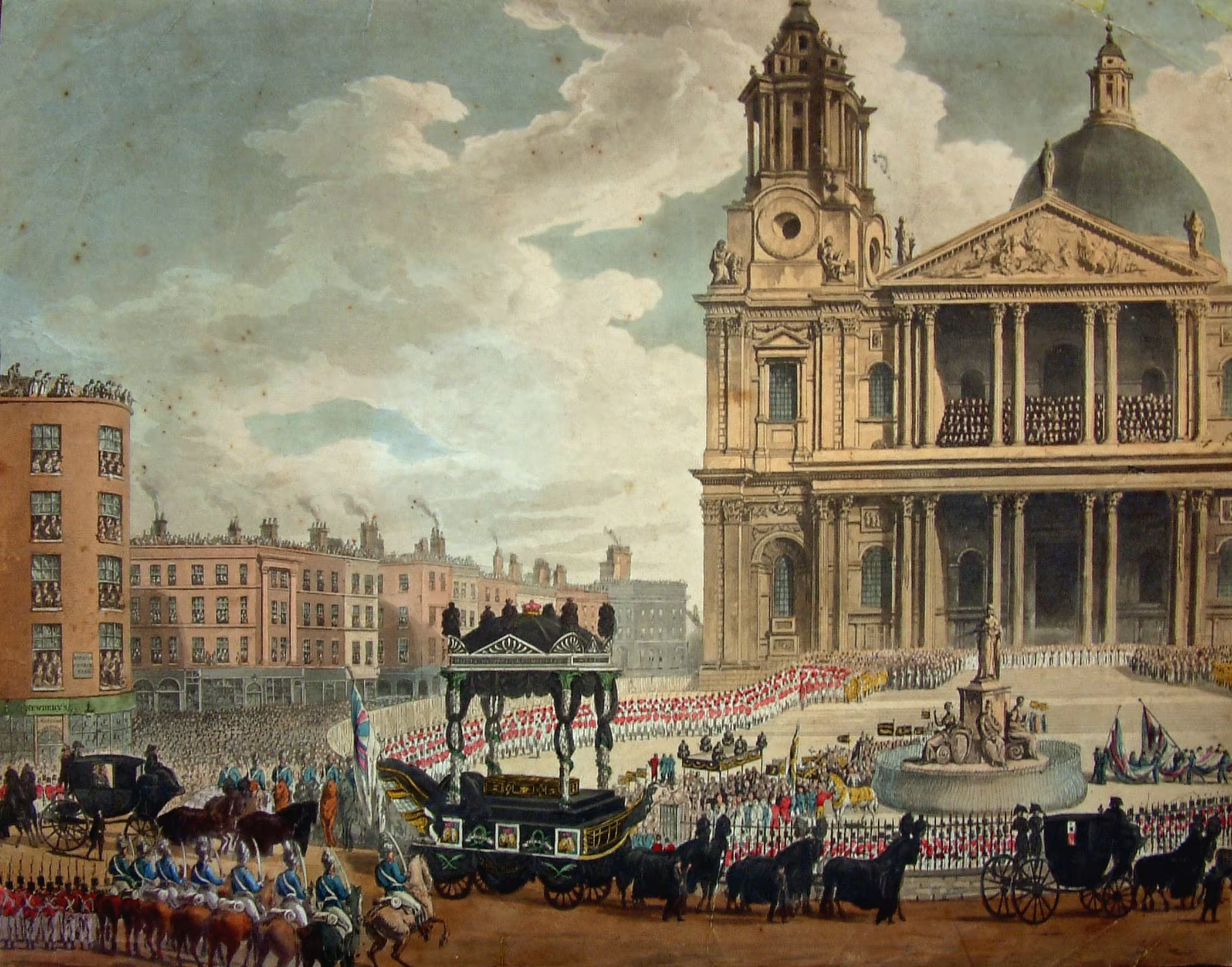
- Nelson's funeral procession arriving at St Paul's Cathedral
- Date: 9 January 1806
- Location: St Paul's Cathedral, London
- Burial: Crypt of St Paul's

Vice-Admiral of the White Horatio Nelson, 1st Viscount Nelson, was given a state funeral in London on 9 January 1806. It was the first to be held at St Paul's Cathedral and was the grandest of any non-royal person to that date. Nelson was shot and killed on 21 October 1805, aged 47, aboard his flagship, HMS Victory, during the Battle of Trafalgar, part of the Napoleonic Wars. The successful outcome of the battle against a larger Franco-Spanish fleet, secured British naval supremacy and ended the threat of a French invasion of the United Kingdom. Nelson's previous victories meant that he was revered as a national hero and news of his death was met with near universal shock and mourning. The scale of his funeral was not only an expression of public sentiment, but also an attempt by the British Government to improve the perception of its prosecution of the war.

== Background ==
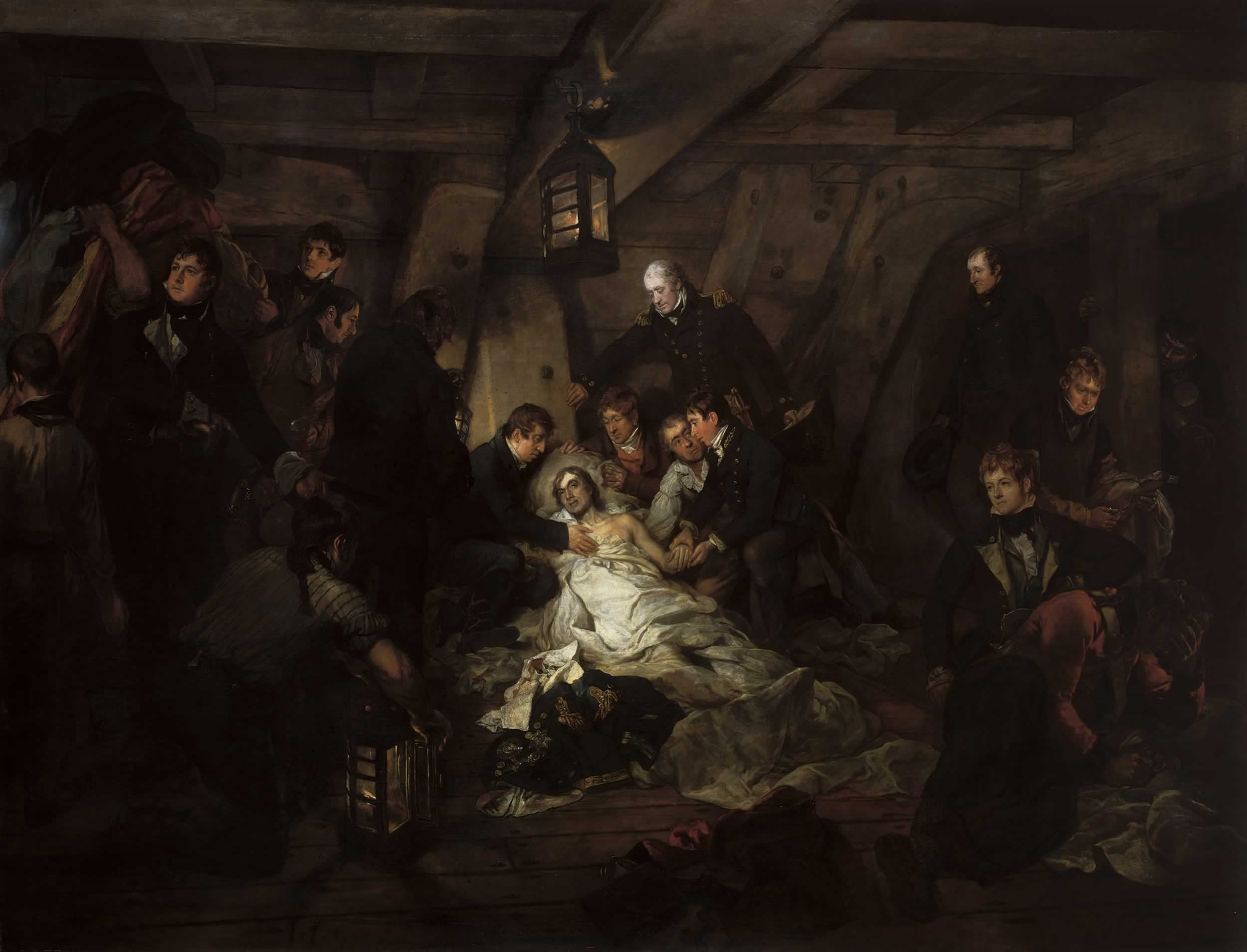
The Death of Nelson, 21 October 1805, a painting by Arthur William Devis who attended Nelson's autopsy.

The breakdown of the year-long peace that followed the Treaty of Amiens led to the United Kingdom declaring war on France in May 1803, a conflict that would become known as the War of the Third Coalition. Nelson was tasked with reestablishing a naval blockade of the French fleet at Toulon. In the meantime, Napoleon planned an invasion of the United Kingdom, assembling a large number of boats and an army at the Channel ports and devising a plan to lure the British fleet away. Accordingly, in March 1805, Pierre-Charles Villeneuve, the French commander, evaded the blockade and headed for the West Indies with Nelson in pursuit. Returning again, Villeneuve decided not to risk Napoleon's plan for the combined French and Spanish fleet to dominate the English Channel and instead put into Cádiz with Nelson's fleet blocking outside. In a final attempt to break out, the opposing fleets met off Cape Trafalgar on 21 October 1805, where the outnumbered British inflicted a devastating defeat on the Franco-Spanish. However, at the height of the action, Nelson was shot by a French sharpshooter and died of his wound before the end of the battle. By this time, Napoleon had already decided to abandon the invasion, but Trafalgar ensured that it could not be attempted at any later date.

== Return to England ==
Nelson died at around 4:30 pm on 21 October 1805 during the final stages of the battle. As he lay dying, he had asked the captain of the Victory, Thomas Hardy, not to have him thrown overboard, as it was customary in combat for the dead of whatever rank to be quickly dropped over the ship's side without ceremony. Nelson's deputy, Vice-Admiral Cuthbert Collingwood, wanted to return Nelson's body to Britain by the quickest means possible and nominated the fast frigate, HMS Euryalus for the task. However, the crew of Victory were aghast at the idea of surrendering their admiral to another ship and through their boatswain's mate, lobbied Collingwood to be allowed to bring Nelson home in his own flagship, which was finally agreed.

Victory's surgeon, William Beatty, had to devise a way of preserving the corpse for the lengthy voyage to England. The usual method was to seal the corpse in a lead coffin, but there was insufficient lead on board to make one. Beatty therefore obtained the largest water cask on the ship, known as a "leaguer", for the purpose. Standing on its end, it was lashed to the base of the main mast on the middle gun deck. Nelson's queue was removed and later sent to his mistress, Emma, Lady Hamilton. Dr Beatty performed a brief autopsy, with the aim of determining the path of the fatal bullet. Dressed only in his long shirt, Nelson's body was lowered into the cask head first; it was then filled with brandy, in preference to naval rum because of its higher alcohol content. A Royal Marine sentry was posted to keep watch.

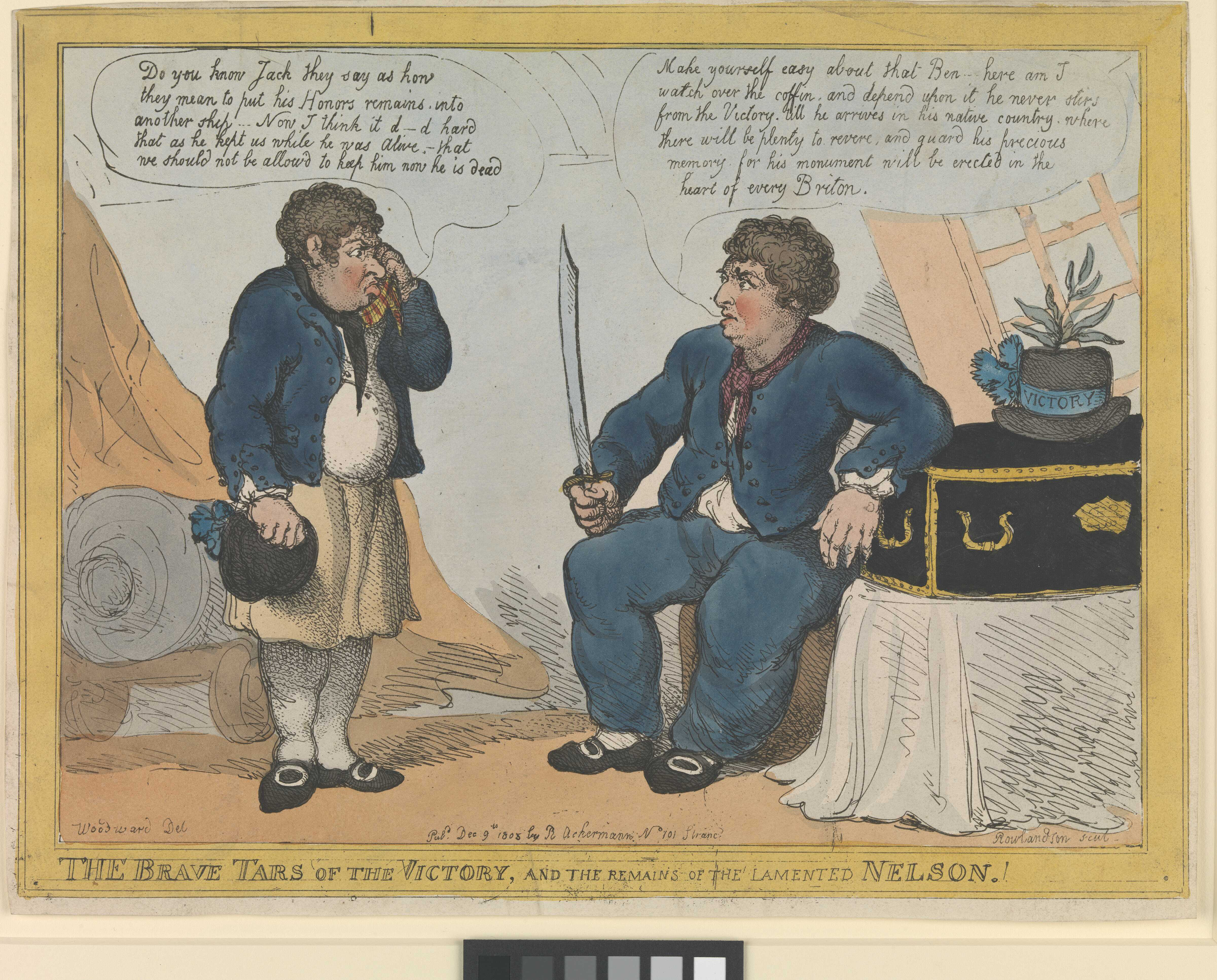
A cartoon by Thomas Rowlandson depicting two of Victory's crew asserting their claim to return Nelson's body, which was actually preserved in a large cask rather than the coffin shown.

During the battle, Victory had suffered severe damage to both her hull and rigging. The hull was leaking heavily and required continuous pumping. The mizzen mast had been lost completely, while the main mast and fore mast had both been shot through and had to be supported by spars lashed to them. The ship began to make her way to Gibraltar, but on the evening of 23 October, a gale with heavy squalls came in from the southwest, and the next morning, she had to be taken in tow by HMS Polyphemus. On 25 October, the towing line parted in the continuing heavy weather, and another tow, this time from HMS Neptune, was not undertaken until the following day. Victory arrived at Gibraltar on 28 October and began temporary repairs. During preparations for the voyage to England, the ship's purser obtained further supplies of brandy, as well as quantities of spirits of wine, which was a purer form of alcohol. The level of brandy was found to have dropped considerably in the cask, and it was refilled with spirits of wine. The voyage between Gibraltar and Portsmouth began on 3 November, but because of further storms, Victory did not arrive until 4 December, during which time, the cask had to be refilled twice with a mixture of brandy and spirits.

While awaiting orders in the Solent, a lead coffin was brought on board. Once the Victory had set sail again on 11 December bound for the Thames Estuary, the cask was opened and Dr Beatty performed a more thorough autopsy, noting that "...all the vital parts were so perfectly healthy, and so small, that they resembled more those of a youth, than a man who had attained his forty-seventh year". Beatty concluded that death had been due to "a wound of the left pulmonary artery", but that damage to the spine would have ultimately been fatal within "two or three days, though his existence would have been miserable to himself, and highly distressing to the feelings of all around him". The artist Arthur William Devis had boarded the ship at Portsmouth and was present at the autopsy; the sketches that he made of Nelson's preserved corpse were later used in his famous painting, The Death of Nelson, 21 October 1805. Following the autopsy, the body was dressed in cotton and then swathed in bandages from head to foot, before being sealed in the lead coffin. Victory was again beset with poor weather and unfavourable winds, causing her to put in at Dover until 16 December, finally arriving off the Nore on 23 December. Here the lead coffin was opened, the body redressed in uniform "small clothes" and a night cap, before being placed in the wooden coffin made from the mainmast of Orient, the French flagship at the Battle of the Nile in 1798; it had been presented to Nelson by Captain Benjamin Hallowell Carew after the battle. Nelson's coffin was then transferred to the Commissioner of Chatham Dockyard's yacht, Chatham, where it was placed in an elaborately carved and gilded outer coffin, bearing his styles and titles, that had been made in London. With the ensign-draped coffin on deck, Chatham made her way upstream to Greenwich. In salute, passing ships dipped their colours, riverside churches tolled their bells and the batteries at Tilbury and New Tavern Forts fired minute guns.

== Preparation ==
The news of the victory at Trafalgar and of Nelson's death arrived in London at 1 am on the morning of 6 November, having been rushed there by the commander of the schooner HMS Pickle. Nelson had been a popular hero since the battle of Cape St Vincent in 1797. Public grief at his loss was mixed with a sense that Britain had been saved from imminent invasion. Prime Minister William Pitt the Younger was in poor health and had just received news of the total defeat of Britain's coalition partner, the Austrian Empire, at the Battle of Ulm. For those serving in Pitt's unpopular second ministry, Trafalgar seemed to present an opportunity to improve the public perception of their handling of the war. Public sentiment certainly favoured a grand public funeral; The Sun newspaper called for one to be organised by the College of Heralds, with a great procession of admirals, veterans, soldiers and civic dignitaries.

Pitt accordingly summoned Sir Isaac Heard, the Garter Principal King of Arms and together with three senior ministers, began preparations, which included bestowing an earldom on Nelson's brother, William Nelson and proposing a new order of chivalry. Horatio Nelson himself had requested a private funeral at Burnham Thorpe where his parents were buried, with the caveat; "unless His Majesty signify it to be his pleasure that my body shall be interred elsewhere".

Although Westminster Abbey had traditionally been the resting place of national worthies, by the start of the 19th century there was very little space left for the sort of grand monument to Nelson envisaged by the government. In 1793, the Dean and Chapter of St Paul's had finally been coerced into accepting secular monuments into the cathedral, which they had previously opposed on theological grounds. Accordingly, Lord Hawkesbury, the Home Secretary, wrote to the king suggesting St Paul's as an appropriate venue for the funeral:

As Westminster Abbey is at this time so very crowded with monuments, and as it was thought proper to lodge the Standards taken from your Majesty’s enemies in the different naval victories in the last war in St Paul’s, your Majesty will perhaps consider that Cathedral as the fittest place for this melancholy ceremony, as well as for the erection in future of such monuments as it may be determined to raise to the memory of those who may have rendered considerable naval and military services to their country.

The king replied with his approval on 11 November. Shortly afterwards, the unpopular Prince of Wales (later King George IV), announced that he would be the chief mourner, which William Nelson assented to, but the government were appalled at the suggestion and referred the matter to the king, who ruled that a naval officer should fill the role. The two most senior officers were the First Lord of the Admiralty, Lord Barham and Sir Peter Parker and it was Parker who was finally appointed.

This was to be the first state funeral for a non-royal person since that of John Churchill, 1st Duke of Marlborough in 1722, but the heralds also sought precedents in the earlier funerals of George Monck, 1st Duke of Albemarle in 1670 and Edward Montagu, 1st Earl of Sandwich in 1672, the latter perhaps providing the model for a grand waterbourne procession on the Thames. It would be the first funeral of national importance at the cathedral since that of Sir Philip Sidney in Old St Paul's Cathedral in 1586 and the first true state funeral to take place there. The scale and grandeur of the ceremonial easily exceeded all those preceding events.

== Lying in state ==
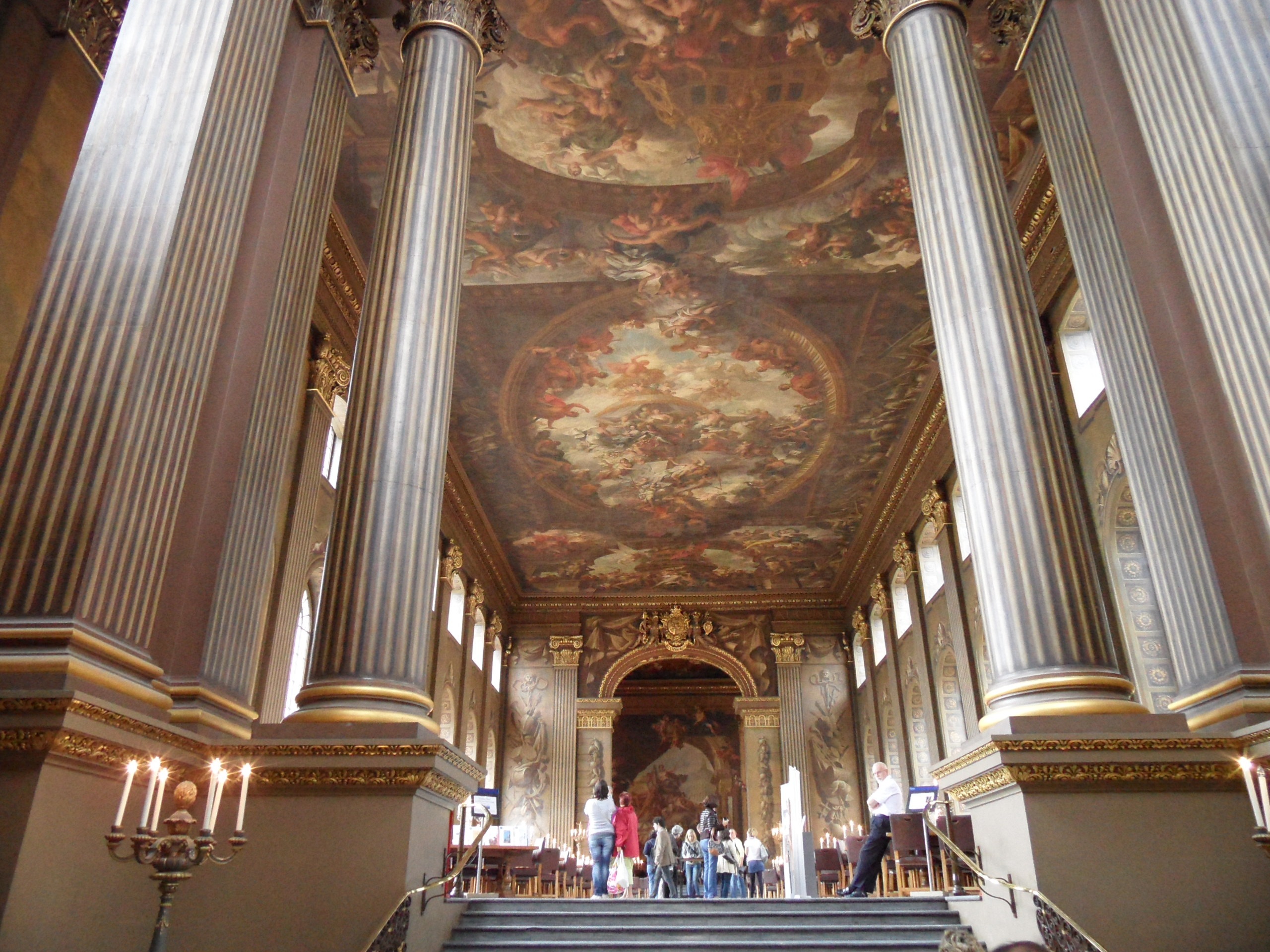
The Painted Hall at Greenwich, where Nelson lay in state for three days.

It was announced on 27 December that the state funeral would take place on 9 January 1806, and would be preceded by a lying-in-state for three days at the Royal Hospital for Seamen at Greenwich, which was a grand retirement home for needy naval veterans. Since Nelson's coffin had arrived at Greenwich, it had been locked in the Record Room at the hospital. On Saturday 4 January, the coffin was moved to the adjacent Painted Hall where the lying-in-state was to take place, and there was a private viewing for the Prince of Wales that afternoon. At 11 o'clock on the following morning, the gates were opened for public viewing. Far more people arrived than could be ushered past the coffin, despite efforts to rush mourners through. By the third day, control of the large crowd outside became such a problem that a detachment of Life Guards was summoned to restore order. When public viewing ended on 7 January, an estimated 15,000 people had filed past the coffin, which was only a fraction of those who had waited outside the hospital gates. The last mourners to be allowed in was a party of 46 seamen and 14 Royal Marines from the Victory, who were loudly applauded by the crowds still hoping in vain to be admitted.

== River procession ==
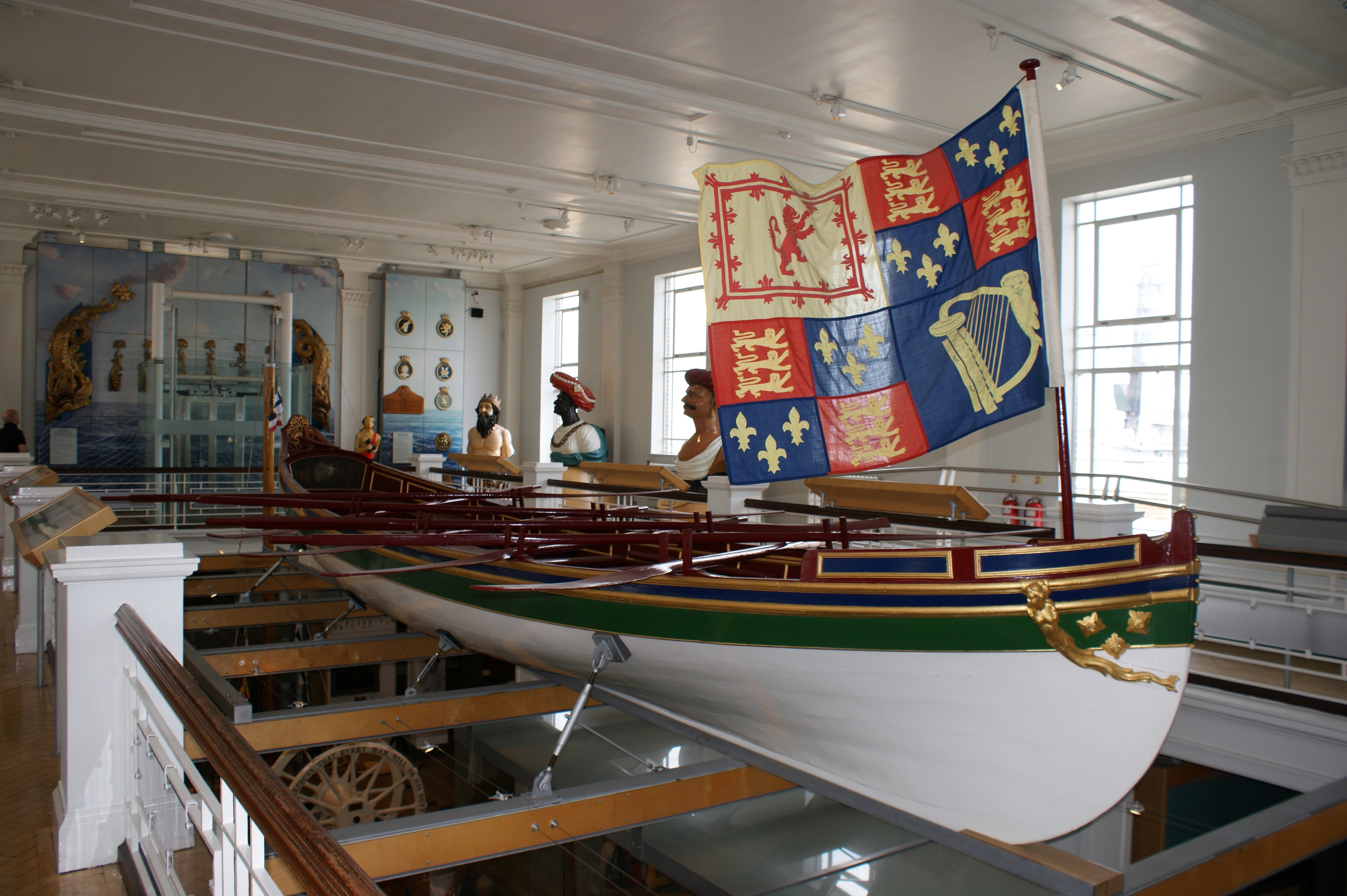
The State Barge of Charles II used to carry Nelson's coffin in the river procession, now preserved at the National Museum of the Royal Navy.

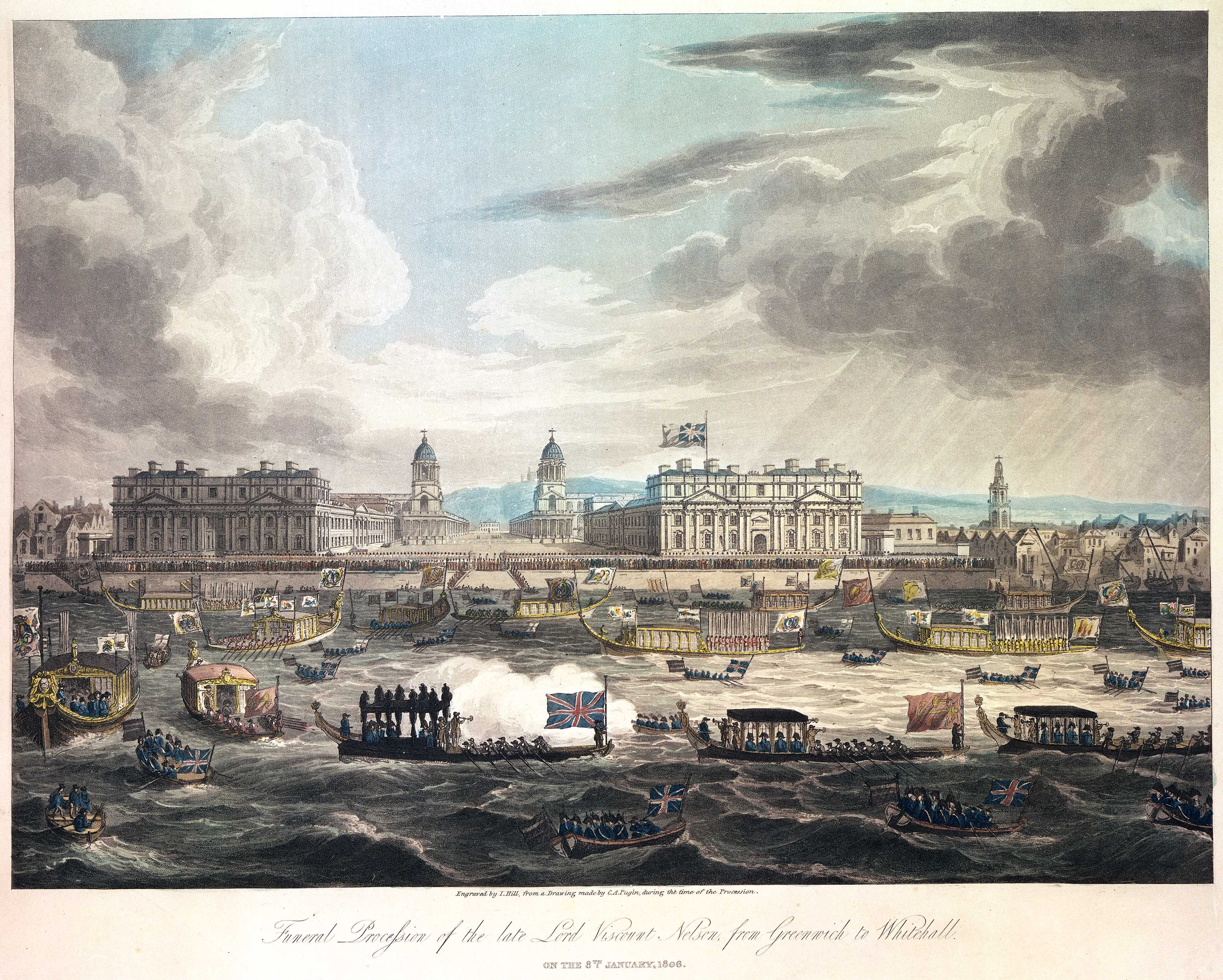
A contemporary panorama by Augustus Charles Pugin, showing the river procession moving off from Greenwich.

On the morning of Wednesday, 8 January, boats and barges began to gather at Greenwich Hospital wharf for the river procession that would convey Nelson's coffin upriver to Westminster. Life Guards and the Greenwich Volunteers were required to keep the large crowd of onlookers in order, despite the bitter southwesterly wind, which also caused difficulties for the watermen. At 12.30, the coffin was brought in procession through a guard of the Deptford Volunteers to the King's Stairs and loaded aboard the funeral barge, which was the State Barge of Charles II. It was covered in black velvet, and embellished with black feathers and heraldic devices. The Clarenceaux King of Arms and several naval officers accompanied the coffin. The funeral barge was rowed by sailors from the Victory, the other state barges were crewed by selected Greenwich Pensioners. The first state barge carried the standard and guidon supported by naval officers and heralds, while the second carried Nelson's banner and great banner and heraldic emblems. Following the funeral barge was the fourth state barge, which carried the chief mourner, Admiral Parker, together with the six assistant mourners, all senior naval officers. Following the state barges were the royal barge with officials representing the king, a barge for the lords commissioners of the Admiralty, one for the Lord Mayor of London and the City of London Corporation, one for the Thames Navigation Commission and eight representing the City livery companies. Accompanying these barges were dozens of other small vessels, some official and others filled with onlookers.

Minute guns were fired by the River Fencibles from their gunboats throughout the proceedings and when the procession reached the Tower of London at 2:45, the great guns on the wharf also joined the minute gun salute. All along the Thames, the banks were packed with spectators, who also crowded the decks and rigging of all the ships moored in the river. Westminster was finally reached at 3:30, the wind and squally showers having made hard work for the oarsmen. Nelson's coffin and the funeral party disembarked at Whitehall Stairs, the remaining dignitaries proceeded further upstream to Palace Yard Stairs where carriages were waiting to return them to London. The coffin was carried in procession by eight Victory seamen along Whitehall to The Admiralty, where it lay overnight in the Captain's Room.

== Procession to St Paul's ==
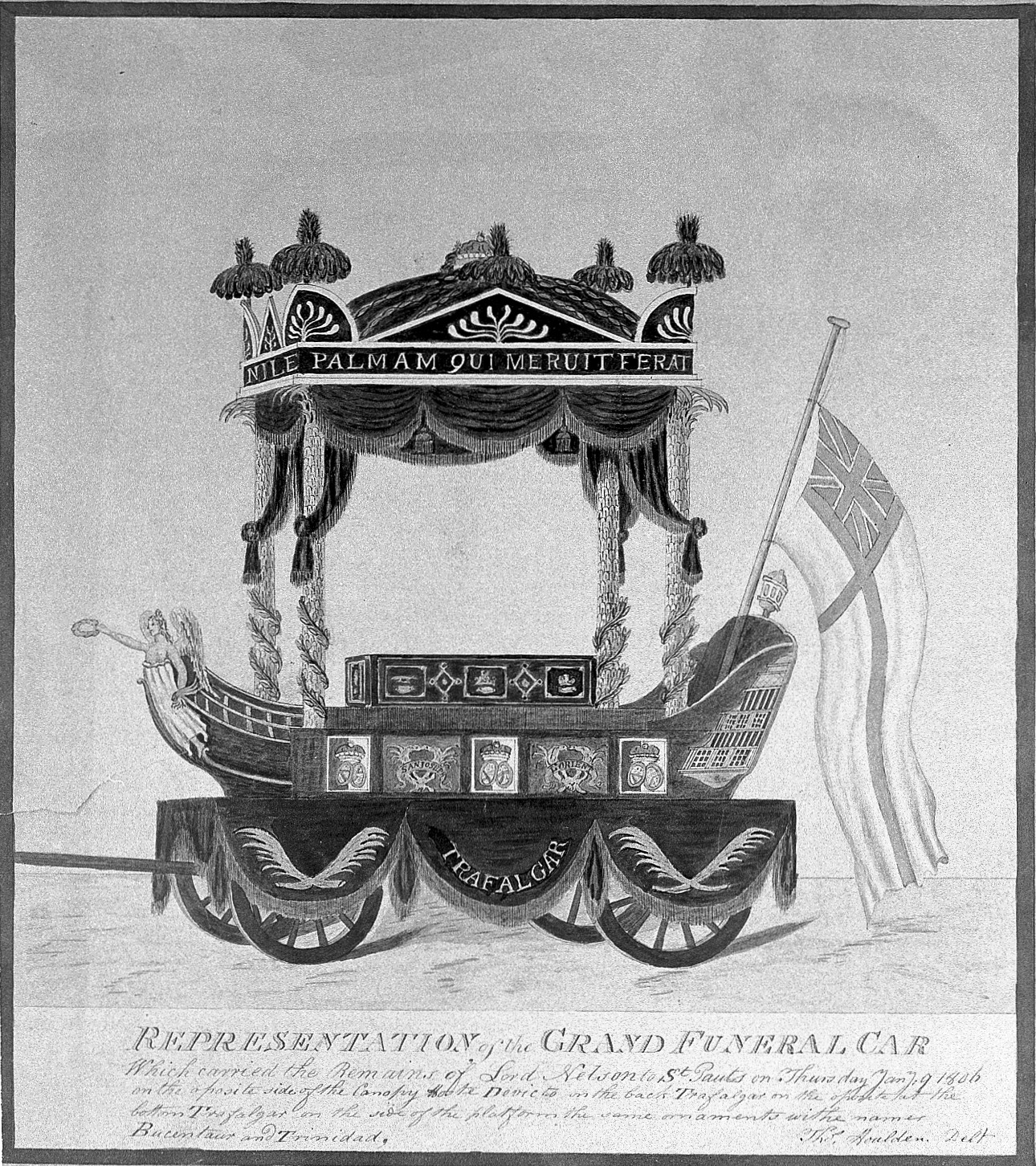
The Grand Funeral Car of Lord Nelson.

Before dawn the next morning, Thursday 9 January, crowds began to gather along the processional route, some having waited outside all night to secure a good view. The owners of many of the overlooking houses had rented out their rooms at exorbitant prices to wealthier onlookers; one room in Fleet Street was offered for 20 guineas (£21). The route from Constitution Hill to St Paul's was lined by soldiers of the various Volunteer Corps of London and its suburbs. The military contingent, consisting of four infantry battalions and elements of another four, three cavalry regiments and eleven horse artillery guns, were all commanded by General Sir David Dundas; they formed up in St James's Park and Horse Guards Parade. Also included were 48 crewmen from the Victory, 48 Greenwich Pensioners and the Royal Watermen. Meanwhile, a total of 189 carriages carrying members of the royal family, relatives, official mourners and heralds were assembled in Hyde Park.

In Admiralty Yard, Nelson's coffin was loaded onto an elaborate funeral car, designed by Reverend M'Quin; the front and back of the car represented the bow and stern of HMS Victory, with the coffin between them. The rest of the car was ornamented allegorical figures, heraldic emblems, ostrich feathers and the name "Trafalgar" boldly displayed. A naval ensign flew at half mast above. As the funeral car emerged through the Admiralty gates, the embroidered velvet pall which had covered the coffin was pulled aside "at the earnest request" of the large crowd so that they see the coffin itself. The procession moved off shortly after midday and followed a route from Whitehall to Charing Cross and then along The Strand to Temple Bar, the boundary of the City of London. Here the procession was joined by the Lord Mayor of London on horseback and a further six carriages of City dignitaries. A contemporary account records the reaction of the people along the route:

The scene was particularly affecting, when the spectators exclaimed with reverential enthusiasm, 'the conquering hero comes. Dead! Dead!' A solemn stillness immediately ensued, accompanied with the taking off of hats, and every other mark of the profoundest respect and veneration.

The Highlanders with their bagpipes leading the procession arrived at St Paul's at 1:45, the funeral car arriving about 15 minutes later.

== Funeral service ==
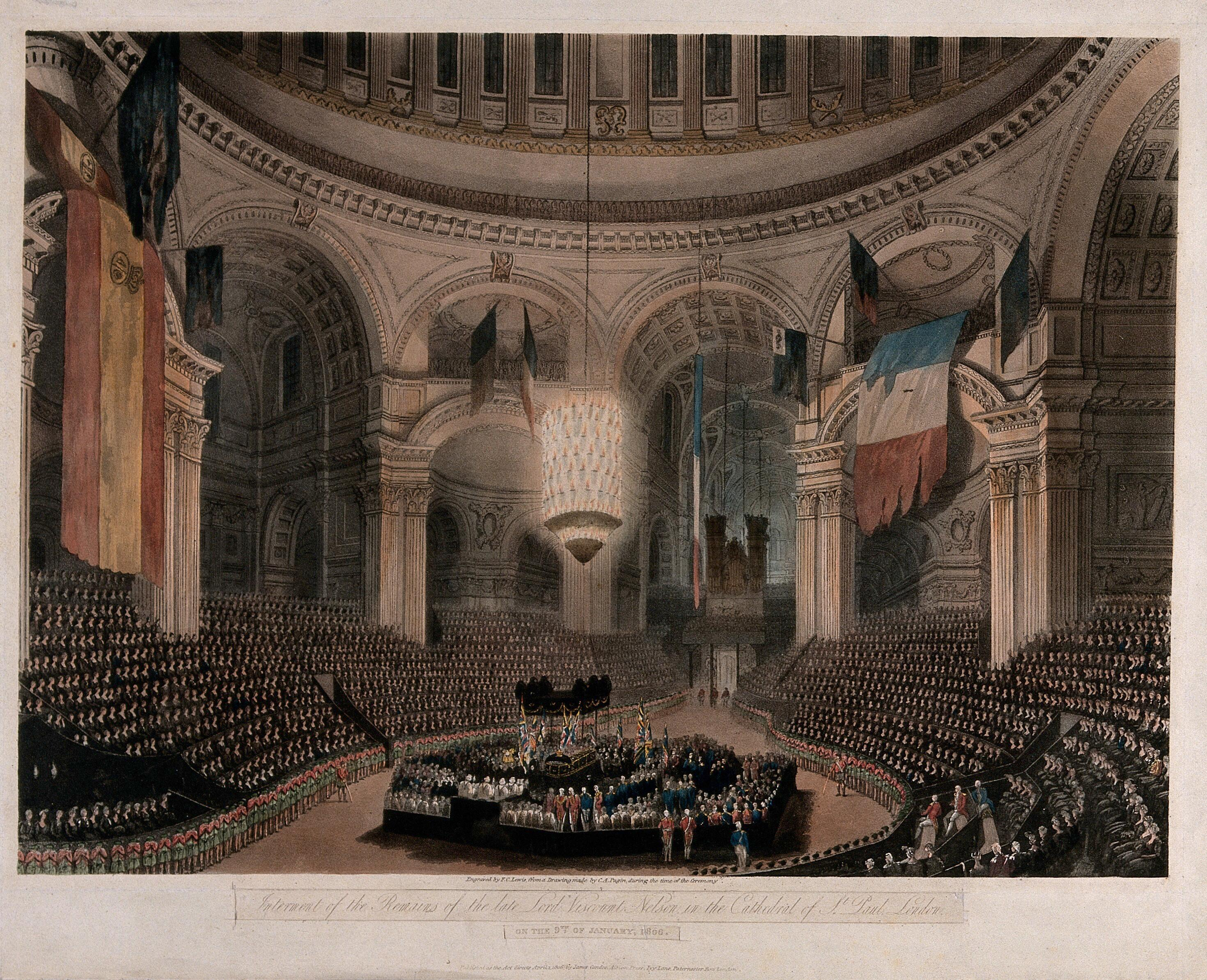
The funeral service at under the dome at St. Paul's Cathedral. Captured Spanish and French ensigns hang from the galleries.

Extensive work had been undertaken inside St Paul's Cathedral in preparation for the funeral. Large wooden galleries had been constructed surrounding the crossing under the dome, to seat around 9,000 people, a larger congregation than at any previous state funeral. Another gallery was built below the organ for the large choir of about 80 singers, drawn from the choirs of St Paul's, Westminster Abbey and the Chapel Royal. Because the lengthy service would continue long after the early winter sunset, an immense chandelier had been suspended above the crossing, which was to be the focus of the liturgy. Large naval ensigns captured from French and Spanish ships at Trafalgar were hung between the piers.

Nelson's coffin did not enter the cathedral until about 3 o'clock, because of the time taken for the distinguished mourners at the rear of the procession to leave their carriages and take their positions inside. The Duke of Clarence, later King William IV, broke protocol and stopped outside to converse with the sailors of the Victory. The liturgy combined Evensong with the funeral service from the Book of Common Prayer and lasted more than two and a half hours. It commenced with Nelson's coffin being brought on a bier with a canopy carried by six vice admirals in procession through the nave to the choir, while the first of William Croft's Funeral Sentences was sung. At the climax of the service, the coffin was brought to the crossing under the dome, while the organ played a dirge composed by the organist, Thomas Attwood. The choir then sang an adaptation of George Frederick Handel's funeral anthem, His body is buried in peace. As the coffin was lowered into the crypt by a hidden mechanism, the sailors from the Victory were supposed to cast the ship's ensign into the opening, but instead, tore the flag into pieces to keep as souvenirs. The service concluded with the traditional proclamation of Nelson's styles and titles by the Garter King at Arms. The service finished before six o'clock, but the cathedral was not cleared until nine.

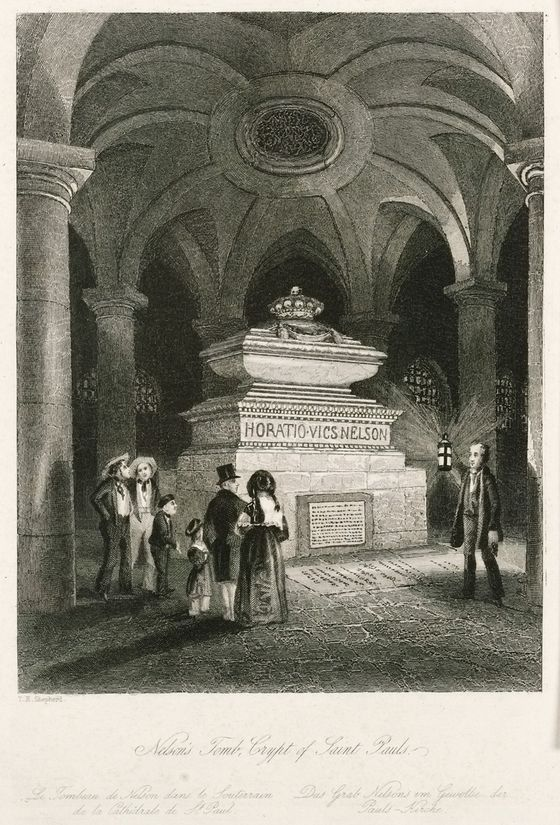
Visitors viewing Nelson's tomb in the crypt of St Paul's; an engraving of about 1830.

== Aftermath ==
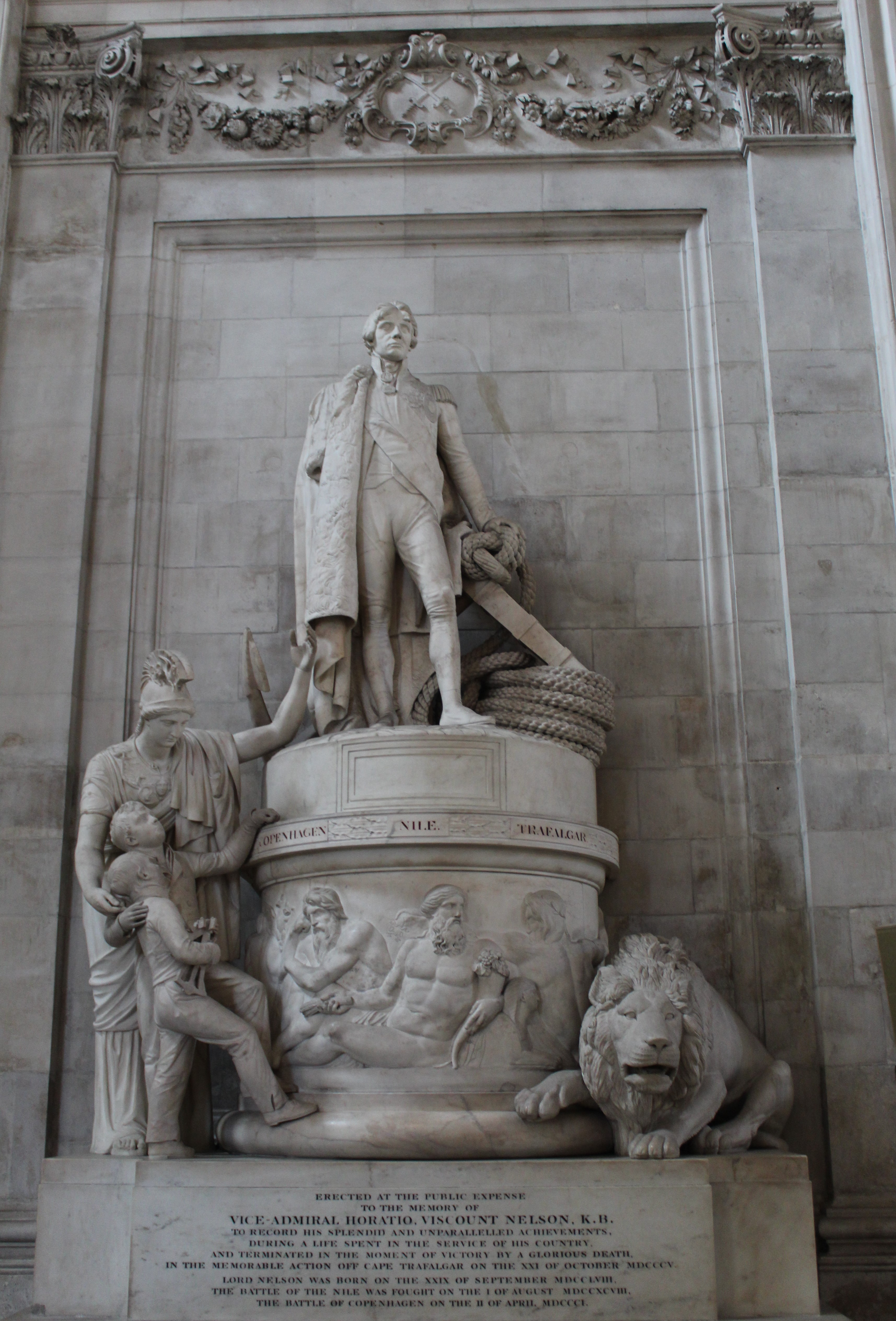
John Flaxman's monument to Nelson in the nave of St Paul's

In the crypt of St Paul's, Nelson's body was interred below an elaborate black marble sarcophagus, which had originally been commissioned for Cardinal Thomas Wolsey, then appropriated by King Henry VIII for himself, but not used. There was a public outcry when it emerged that the four vergers at St Paul's were charging the public a shilling each to view Nelson's tomb, pocketing as much as £300 a day between them. The funeral car was taken to St James's Palace, where it attracted such large crowds that it had to be moved to Greenwich Hospital.

Three weeks later, Parliament voted the funds for a monument to Nelson to be erected in the nave of St Paul's. This formed part of a series of some thirty monuments to Napoleonic-era naval and military officers at St Pauls which had been funded by Parliament in an apparent effort to emulate the Panthéon in Paris. The completed monument by John Flaxman was unveiled in 1818 and consisted of a larger than life statue of Nelson leaning on an anchor and a coiled rope, above a figure of Britannia who is pointing out the admiral to two boy sailors. The inscription on the pedestal mentions Nelson's "splendid and unparalleled achievements" and his "life spent in the service of his country, and terminated in the moment of victory by a glorious death".
