= Walter Burke (purser) =

- Born: 1736; Limerick
- Died: 12 September 1815 (aged 78–79); Wouldham

Walter Burke (1736 – 12 September 1815) was a purser in the Royal Navy. He is best known for serving aboard HMS Victory at the Battle of Trafalgar on 21 October 1805, and was present at the death of Lord Nelson in the cockpit of the Victory.

== Family and early life ==
Burke was born in Limerick, Ireland. He was a relation of the politician Edmund Burke. He joined the navy, due to having a family member already enlisted.

He had at least three sons in the navy. One son, Henry Burke, rose to the rank of commander (from Lieutenant of the Renown) on 4 October 1800, and captained the 16-gun brig-sloop HMS Seagull from June 1802. In August 1803, he re-took the (East Indiaman) Lord Nelson, which had been captured by the privateer Bellone several days previously. Captain Henry Burke, and a younger brother, were lost with the rest of Seagull's complement when she disappeared at sea in the English Channel in February 1805. Another son, Walter Burke, rose to the rank of lieutenant. He was mortally wounded during the boarding the French ship Chevrette in July 1801, and died in hospital.

== At Trafalgar ==
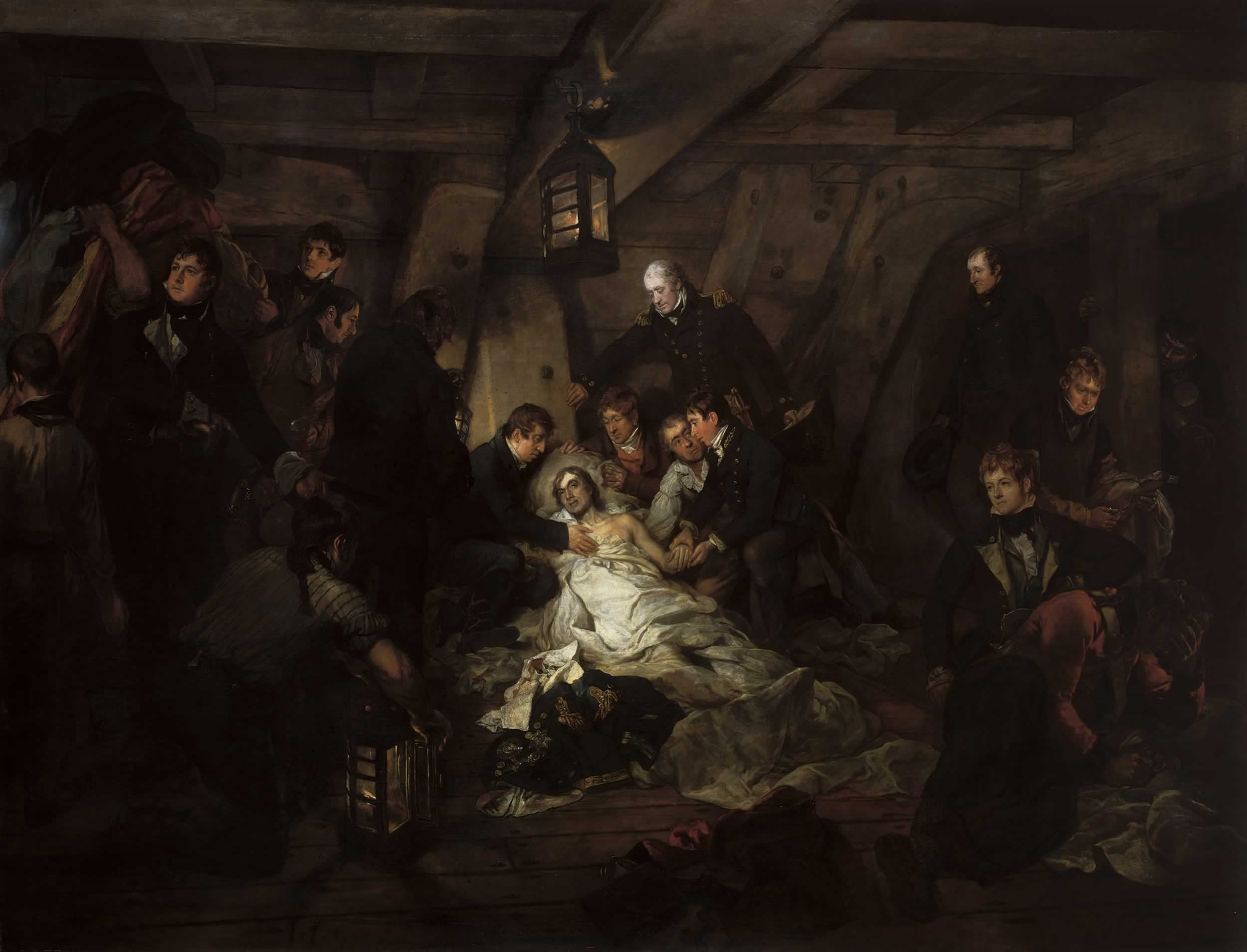
Walter Burke is visible immediately to the right of Nelson, supporting his pillow. He is shown half-length to left wearing a brown coat and red waistcoat.

Burke was the oldest serving officer aboard Victory at the Battle of Trafalgar, also at the age of 69, he was the oldest purser in the Royal Navy.

The artist Arthur William Devis depicted Burke in his 1807 painting, The Death of Nelson, 21 October 1805. The picture shows many of the officers present at the moment of Nelson's death. Portrayed are Revd. Dr Alexander Scott, Nelson's chaplain, rubbing his chest to help relieve the pain. Nelson's steward, William Chevailler, looks towards Dr William Beatty, Victory's surgeon, who feels Nelson's pulse and is about to pronounce him dead. Sir Thomas Masterman Hardy stands to the right of the painting - though Hardy was not actually present at the moment of death. Midshipman Edward Collingwood and Lieutenant John Yule (rear left and left), gesture towards a pile of captured enemy flags being brought in by a seaman. Gaetano Spedillo, Nelson's Italian valet, stands in right profile in front of Collingwood, holding a glass from which Nelson took his last sips of water. Victory's carpenter, Mr Bunce, stands on the far right of the painting above Lieutenant George Miller Bligh, the dazed and wounded figure seated far right. Seated to the right of Bligh is Assistant Surgeon Neil Smith. Burke is shown kneeling to the right of Nelson, visible under Hardy's arm, partly obscured by Spedillo. He is supporting Nelson by propping up his pillow.

Lord Nelson was quoted

"It is nonsense, Mr. Burke, to suppose I can live. My sufferings are great but they will soon be over."

== Later life ==
Burke survived the battle and lived 10 years more before dying at the age of 79 in 1815. He had retired from the navy to live at Wouldham, where he owned both 'Purser Place' and 'Burke House'. Both were dismantled, and their materials moved to Maresfield in East Sussex, where a new house called 'Purser Place' was built in 1937.

Two large shell cases which stood at his gate of Burke House are claimed to be relics of HMS Victory. They were moved to beneath the west window of Wouldham All Saints Church.

His headstone in Wouldham Church reads:

Sacred to the Memory of Walter Burke, Esq, of this Parish, who died on the 12th September 1815 in the 70th year of his age. He was Purser on His Majesty's Ship Victory in the glorious Battle of Trafalgar, and in his arms the immortal Nelson died.

== Memorials ==
Two roads in the Medway area have been named after him.

- Walter Burke Avenue in Wouldham,
- Walter Burke Way in Chatham, Kent
