= Listed buildings in Wouldham =

Civil Parish in Kent, England

Wouldham is a village and civil parish in the Tonbridge and Malling district of Kent, England. It contains seven listed buildings that are recorded in the National Heritage List for England. Of these two are grade I and five are grade II.

This list is based on the information retrieved online from Historic England.

== Key ==
Grade	Criteria
I	Buildings that are of exceptional interest
II*	Particularly important buildings of more than special interest
II	Buildings that are of special interest

== Listing ==
Name	Grade	Location	Type	Completed (Note: The date given is the date used by Historic England as significant for the initial building or that of an important part in the structure's description.)	Date designated	Grid ref. (Note: The grid reference is based on the British national grid reference system, sometimes known as OSGB36, used by the Ordnance Survey.) Geo-coordinates	Notes	Entry number (Note: The "List Entry Number" is a unique number assigned to each listed building and scheduled monument by Historic England.)	Image	Wikidata
Church of All Saints	I	High Street	church building		25 August 1959	TQ7126364391; 51°21′10″N 0°27′29″E		1070490	Church of All Saints More images	Q17530212
Wouldham Court Farmhouse	II	244-246, High Street			1 August 1952	TQ7132864373; 51°21′09″N 0°27′33″E		1101720	Upload Photo	Q26395452
Gardeners Cottage	II	29, Keepers Cottage Lane, ME1 3FH			25 February 1987	TQ7144762900; 51°20′22″N 0°27′36″E		1070489	Upload Photo	Q26324426
Granary Cottage	II	31, Keepers Cottage Lane, ME1 3FH			25 February 1987	TQ7145962899; 51°20′22″N 0°27′37″E		1363121	Upload Photo	Q26644965
2-4, Rochester Road	II	2-4, Rochester Road			25 February 1987	TQ7218262994; 51°20′24″N 0°28′14″E		1101725	Upload Photo	Q26395461
Scarborough House	II	Rochester Road			25 February 1987	TQ7213063115; 51°20′28″N 0°28′12″E		1070491	Upload Photo	Q26324428
Starkey Castle	I	Rochester Road	manor house		1 August 1952	TQ7138365592; 51°21′49″N 0°27′37″E		1347808	Starkey Castle More images	Q17530301

== See also ==
- Grade I listed buildings in Kent
- Grade II* listed buildings in Kent

== Sources ==
- Newman, John (2012) [1969], Kent: West and the Weald, The Buildings of England, New Haven and London: Yale University Press, ISBN 978-0-300-18509-6
