= Eliza O'Neill as Belvidera =

Painting by Arthur William Devis

- Artist: Arthur William Devis
- Year: 1816
- Type: Oil on canvas, portrait painting
- Dimensions: 254 cm × 160 cm (100 in × 63 in)
- Location: Wolverhampton Art Gallery, Wolverhampton

Eliza O'Neill as Belvidera is a c.1816 portrait painting by the British artist Arthur William Devis It shows the popular Irish actress Elizabeth O'Neill, one of the stars of London's West End stage during the Regency era. She is depicted in character in one of her celebrated roles Belvidera from Thomas Otway's Restoration tragedy Venice Preserved. A Venetian scene including the Bridge of Sighs is shown in the background. Today the painting is in the collection of the Wolverhampton Art Gallery, having been acquired in 1970. A mezzotint by Henry Hoppner Meyer based on the painting. was published by Josiah Boydell was produced the same year.

== Bibliography ==
- Armstrong, Jane. Romantic Actors, Romantic Dramas: British Tragedy on the Regency Stage. Springer International, 2022.
- Ashton, Geoffrey. Royal Opera House Retrospective 1732-1982. Royal Opera Houses 1982.
