= The Death of Nelson, 21 October 1805 =

1807 painting by Arthur William Devis

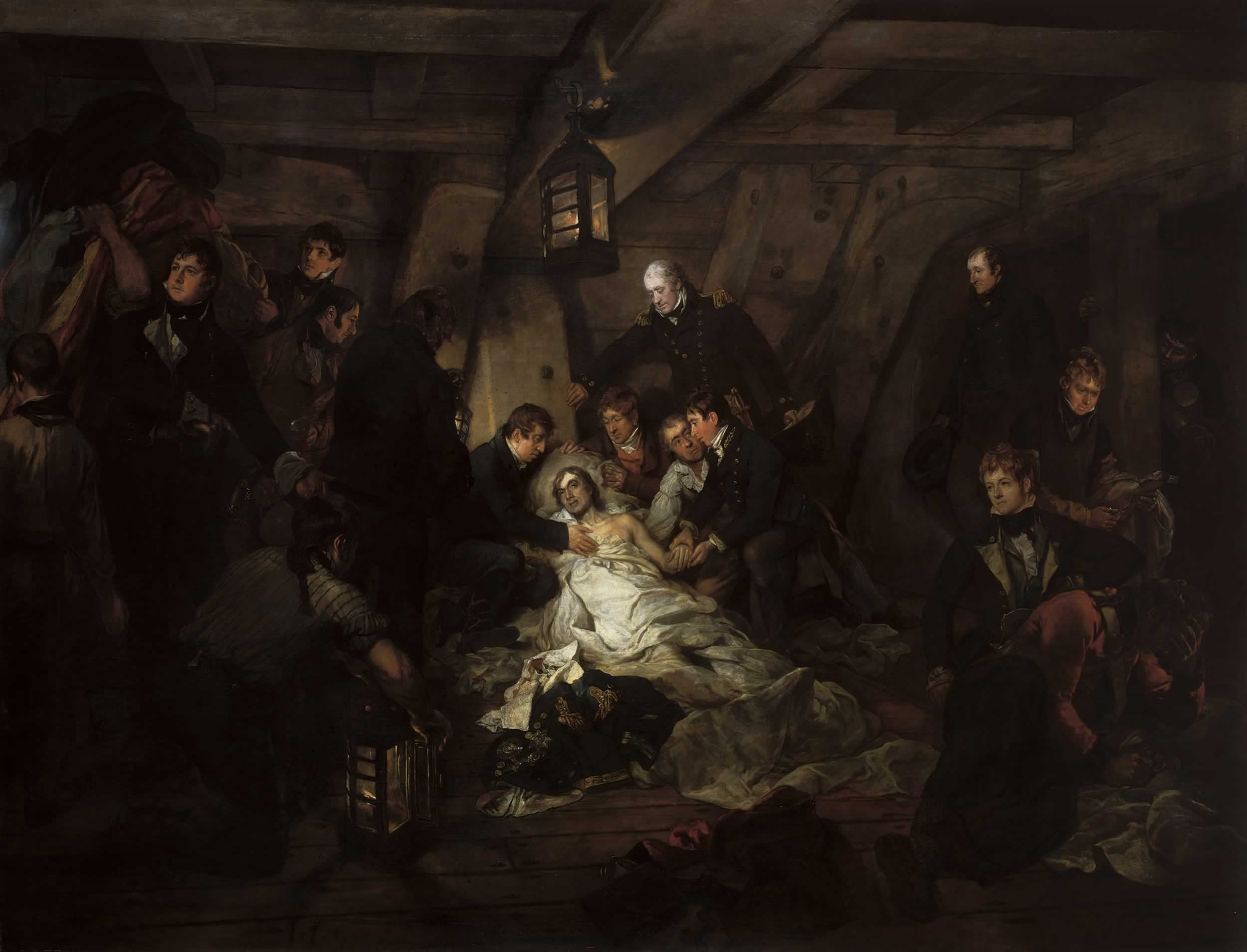
- Artist: Arthur William Devis
- Year: 1807
- Medium: Oil on canvas
- Dimensions: 195.6 cm × 261.6 cm (77.0 in × 103.0 in)
- Location: National Maritime Museum, Greenwich

The Death of Nelson, 21 October 1805 is an 1807 painting by Arthur William Devis portraying the death of Horatio Nelson at 16:30 on 21 October 1805, below decks on his flagship HMS Victory during the Battle of Trafalgar. It is the collection of the National Maritime Museum, Greenwich.

== Inception ==
Only a month after Trafalgar, on 22 November, a press advert by the publisher Josiah Boydell announced he would give a prize of 500 guineas for the best "Death of Nelson" painting, which he would then engrave. Devis and Benjamin West were the two most notable entrants. Devis was released from debtors' prison to produce such a painting, in order to pay off his debts, and – possibly with the help of Alexander Davison (Nelson's banker and one of Devis's patrons) – was allowed to spend a week on board HMS Victory off Portsmouth after her return from Trafalgar. There he made sketches, a model of the place Nelson died, notes and studies for the individual portrait heads (including a sketch of Nelson's body and the bullet that had killed him, during the autopsy on 11 December by Dr William Beatty, the ship's surgeon, as the ship sailed from Portsmouth to the Nore for Nelson's lying-in-state), as well as a separate portrait of Dr Beatty. Beatty also commissioned Devis to produce a half-length painting of Nelson as vice-admiral from the autopsy sketches, which he lent to Emma Hamilton (who later lost it in an accident whilst travelling), and illustrations for his Narratives.

== Reception ==
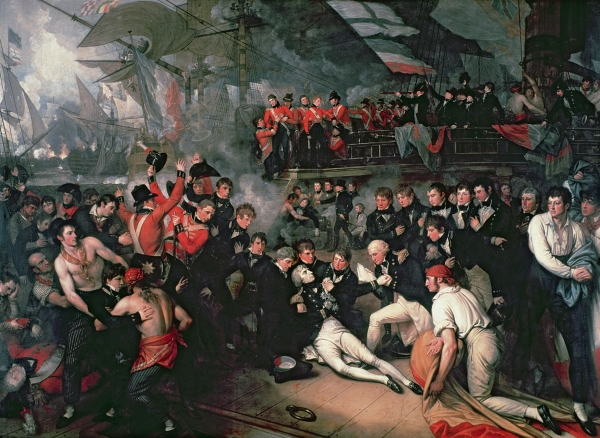
West's version of the scene

West criticised Devis's treatment, which was in contrast to West's own "Epic Composition", also titled The Death of Nelson (which even more inaccurately showed Nelson dying on Victory's quarterdeck where he had first been shot, and was refused by the Greenwich Royal Naval Hospital on West's death – it is now in the Walker Art Gallery Liverpool). However, it was Devis's work that won Boydell's commission, though it was only printed in 1812 despite having already gained 800 subscribers by August 1806 and despite the chosen engraver, William Bromley, having promised to have it done in two years from December 1806. West's painting had made it to print by 1811 and the two had equally great success in the short term, though the Naval Gallery (housed in the Painted Hall at Greenwich Hospital) refused to buy Devis's painting from Boydell. However, Devis's was purchased by Nicholas Vansittart, Lord Bexley (envoy to the Danes at the time of the Battle of Copenhagen), who in 1825 presented it to the Naval Gallery, from which point onwards it became the better known of the two works. Devis’s large oil sketch for it was bought in 1852 by Queen Victoria, from 1892 or earlier to 1992 a waxwork tableau at Madame Tussaud's reproduced the painting, a smaller copy was placed near Nelson's place of death during restoration of Victory in the 1920s, and the original was placed as the Painted Hall's central painting by the late 19th century. In this position, it was at the heart of the Hall's role as a major Nelsonic and naval shrine.

== Accuracy and iconography ==
As with its model, Benjamin West's 1777 The Death of General Wolfe (engraved by Boydell's uncle John), this painting takes liberties with the actual setting and people present. The place of death on the 'tween-deck was actually far shorter than depicted, and Captain Thomas Hardy (standing behind Nelson) was not present at the moment of death. The grouping, with Nelson's posture against a large timber of the ship's hull and role as the main light source in an otherwise dark painting, recalls the Deposition of Christ from the cross.

=== Persons depicted ===
- Revd Alexander Scott, Nelson's chaplain, rubbing his chest to help relieve the pain
- Victory's purser Walter Burke, supporting the pillow.
- Nelson's steward, Chevalier, looking towards Beatty
- William Beatty, ship's surgeon, who feels Nelson's pulse and is about to pronounce him dead
- Captain Thomas Hardy, standing behind Nelson
- Midshipman Collingwood and Lieutenant John Yule (rear left and left), with a pile of captured enemy flags being brought in by a seaman
- Guitano, Nelson's valet, standing in right profile in front of Collingwood, holding a glass from which Nelson took his last sips of water
- Victory's carpenter, Mr Bunce, stands on the far right above Bligh
- Lieutenant George Miller Bligh, the dazed and wounded figure far right, below Bunce
- Assistant Surgeon Neil Smith seated far right
