= Wouldham =

Village in Kent, England

Coordinates: 51.349640°N 0.458360°E

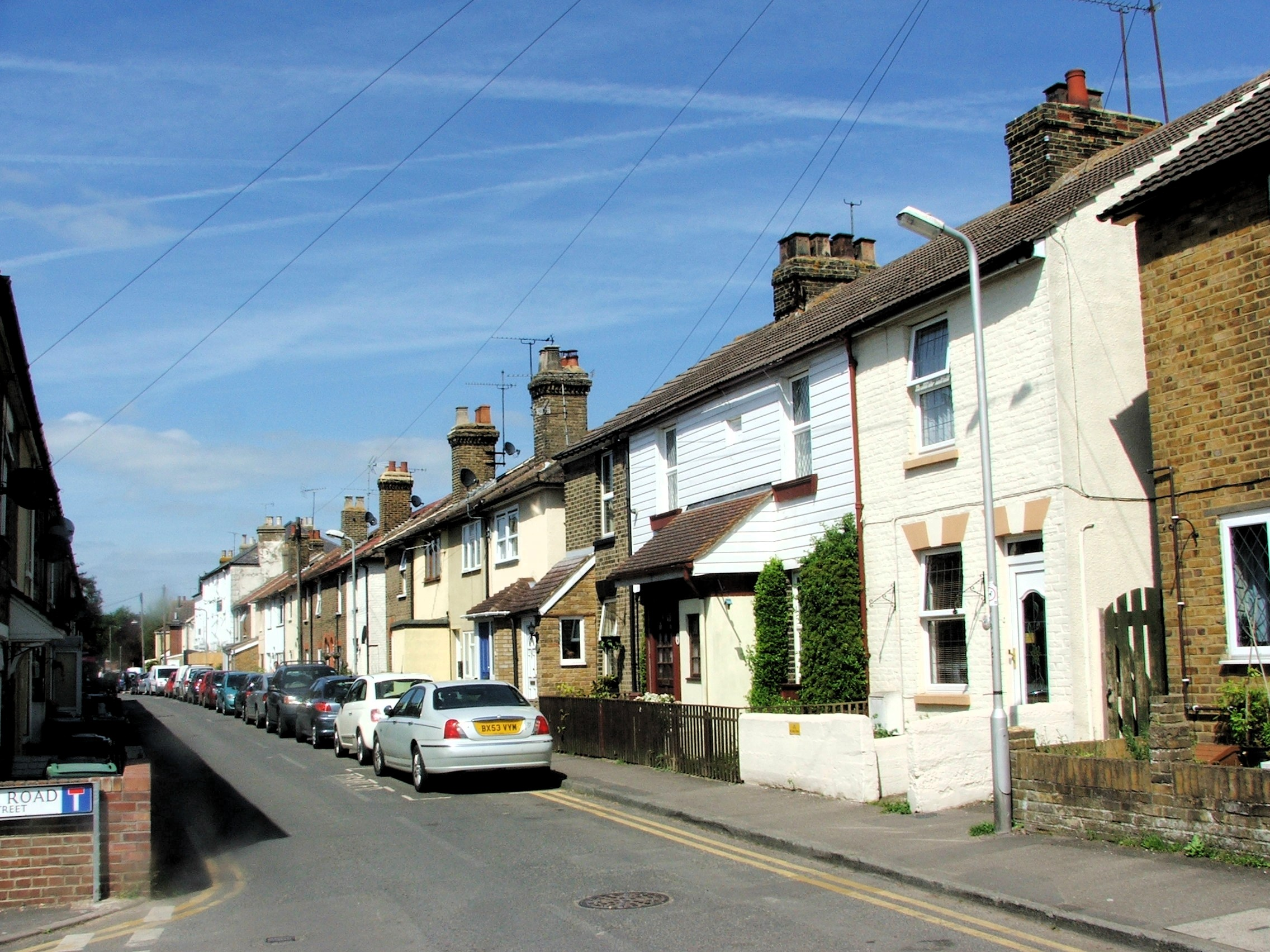
- High Street

- Location within Kent
- Population: 1,497 (2011 Census)
- District: Tonbridge and Malling
- Shire county: Kent
- Region: South East
- Country: England
- Sovereign state: United Kingdom
- Post town: Rochester
- Postcode district: ME1
- Police: Kent
- Fire: Kent
- Ambulance: South East Coast
- UK Parliament: Chatham and Aylesford

Wouldham is a village on the bank of the River Medway in Kent, England. In 2011 its population was approximately 1500, which has increased since 2017, with substantial housing development to the south of the village. It has an 11th-century church, two schools – a primary school and one for those with special educational needs, and two public houses, The Medway Inn and The Waterman's Arms.

== History ==
The tusk and teeth of a mammoth were excavated in Peters Pit and displayed in Rochester Guildhall Museum. In 1982, the skull of an 18-year-old teenager was excavated, dated as 1500 BC. Oral history suggests that the village was occupied when the Romans arrived, and that they constructed a ford across the Medway. The site of a temple dedicated to Mithras has been excavated and occurs on old maps. On the Wouldham Marshes is Starkey House built in 1483: a now restored Grade I listed medieval manor house called Starkey Castle.

In the churchyard, is the grave of Walter Burke, who was present on board HMS Victory at the battle of Trafalgar and the man who held Nelson in his arms as he died. Wouldham primary school celebrates this connection in several ways, with its four sports teams being named after ships at the Battle of Trafalgar (Victory, Ajax, Sovereign, Britannia), students being assigned into a house named after one of four famous figures at Trafalgar, and by holding an annual event at the nearby church to commemorate Walter Burke.

A narwhal was discovered in the 1940s washed up on the bank of the river, and is documented in the Natural History Museum, London.

Until 1963 there was a ferry crossing over the Medway to Halling on the opposite bank.

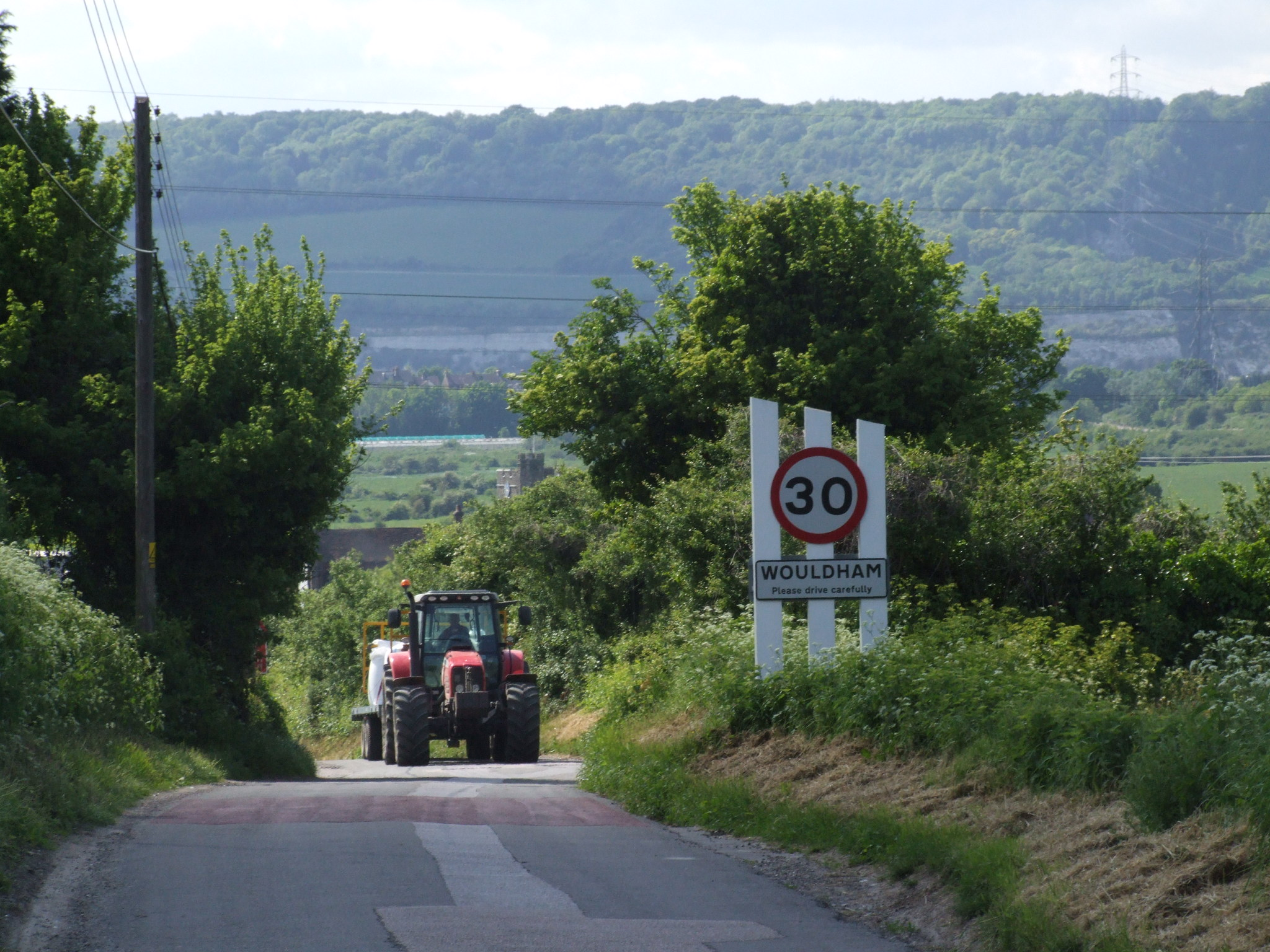
Entrance to Wouldham

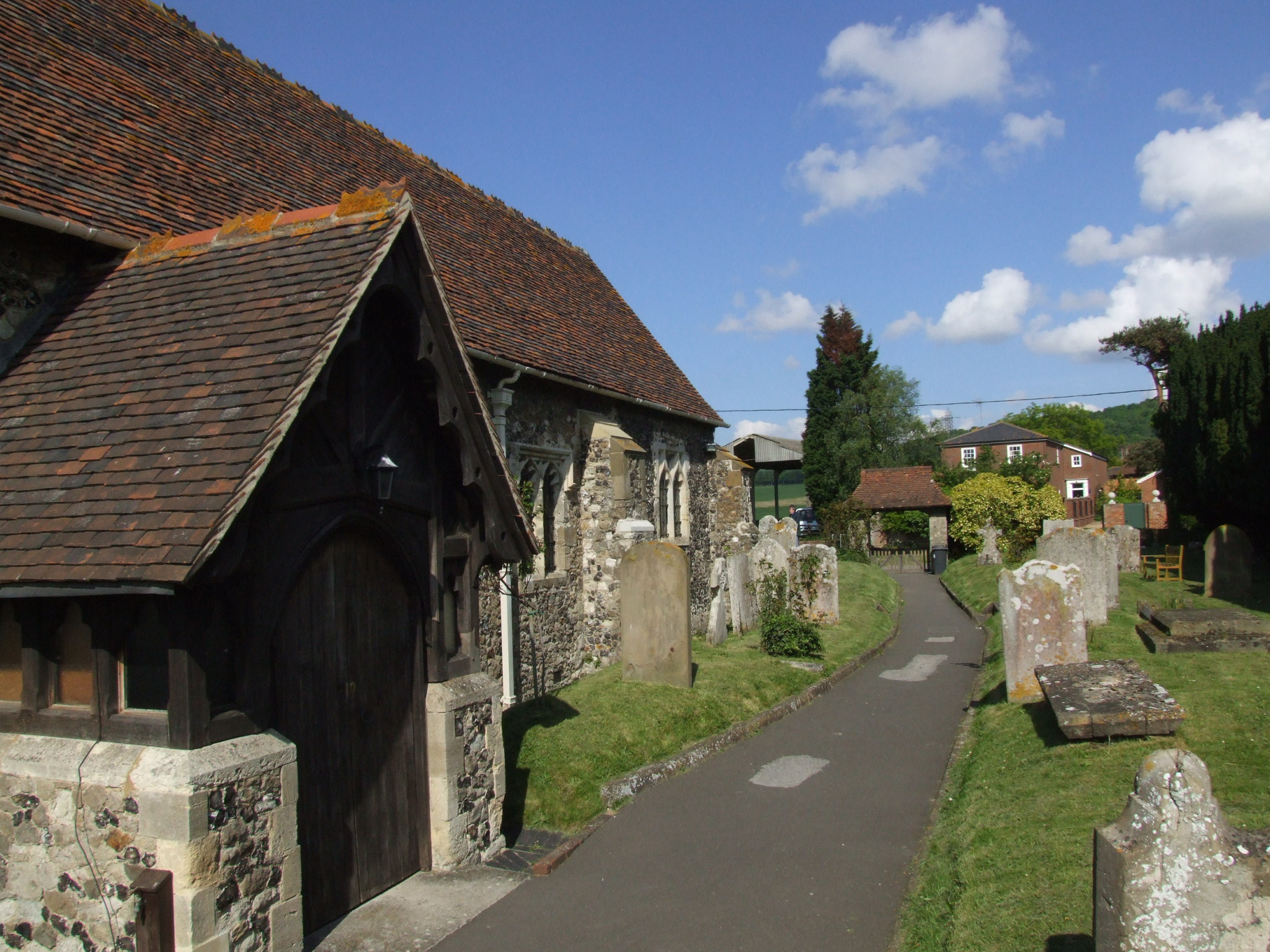
Approach to Wouldham Church

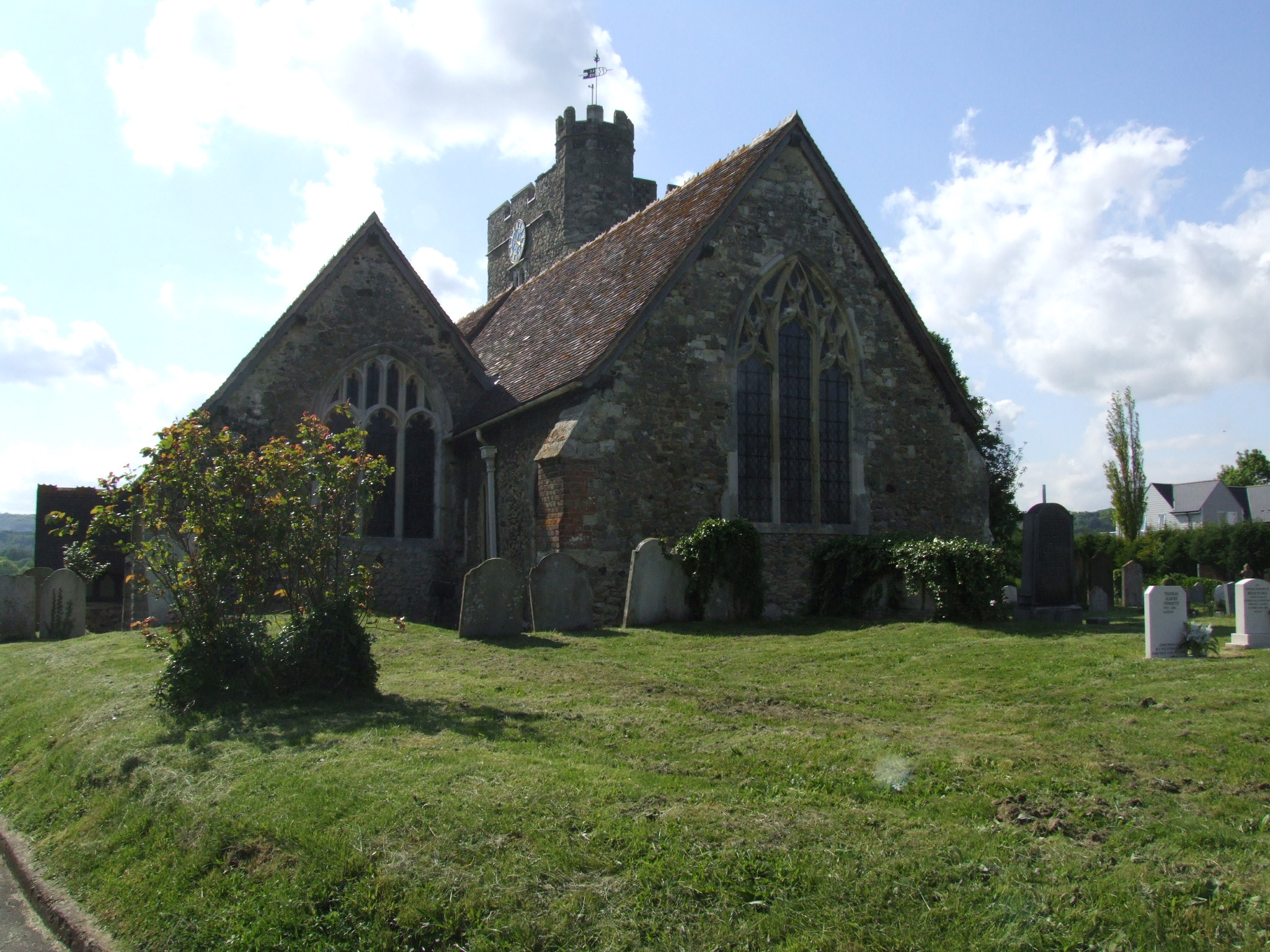
Wouldham Church

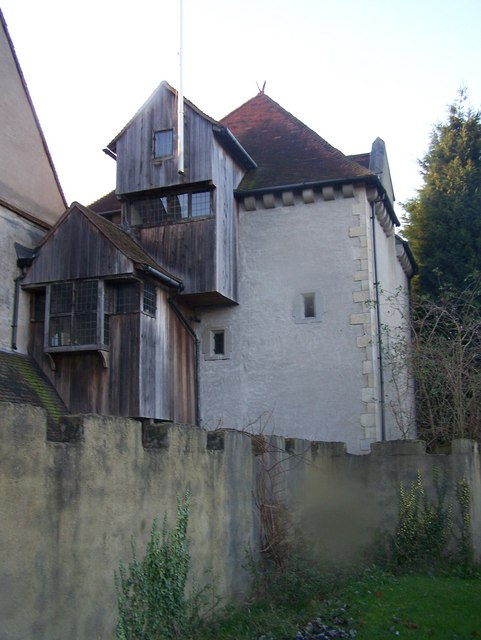
Starkey Castle

== Industry ==
For a hundred years, Wouldham was synonymous with cement. The Wouldham Court Cement Works was the earliest cement works, opening in 1847. The works were based on the riverside in the centre of the village. In 1855, the first owners of the cement works, Thomas Freen and Co, became bankrupt and in 1856 it passed to the Wouldham Patent Portland Cement Co. They built a tramway to connect the works with the quarry, 1,380 ft away.

The Wouldham Hall Cement Works also fronted the river, and took in some land in Burham. William Peters started making hydraulic lime on the site between 1857 and 1866. He had 18 lime kilns. The first wet process cement kilns were installed by the Peters Brothers in 1877.

The cement started with bottle kilns, with 24 in 1879, making 720 tons a week. The raw materials, were obtained on site and the finished product was taken to London in Thames sailing barges. The Peters operation owned 80 barges, and employed 1000 men. In the 1880s the kilns were replaced by Batchelor chamber kilns (each with a capacity of 30 tons per week), and further were added to bring up the production to 990 tons per week. In 1898 seventeen more were added, and in 1903 thee Schneider kilns (at 330 tons) giving a total capacity of 1850. Two Hoffmann kilns were installed, and then two rotary kilns. The first chamber kiln block was demolished, and the remaining chamber kilns were only used up to 1915, though six remained in commission until the sites closure.

The site was obtained by BPCM (Blue Circle) in 1911, who combined operations with the nearby West Kent works. The works closed in 1925/26 for good. There was no railway on this side of the river, so getting to the railway at Snodland involved taking the cement by barge across the river and then hauling it by horse and cart. This was uneconomical compared to the works across the river at Snodland, and Cuxton and Halling, with its rail connection on the Medway Valley line

== Peters Village ==
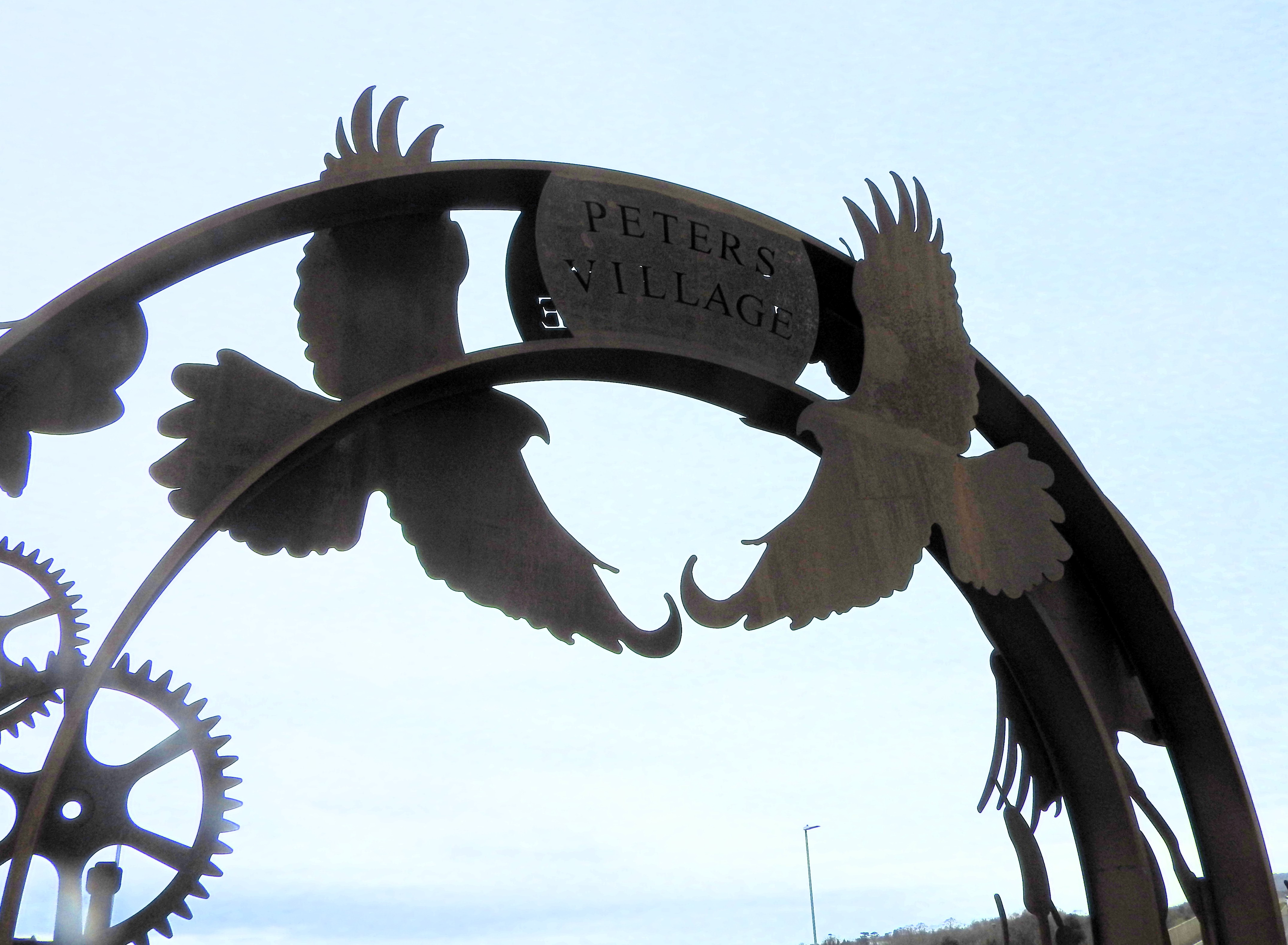

Before 1999, a large area of allotments were situated between the school and the recreation ground. Despite the opposition of many villagers, a housing estate was built over them, which increased the village's population by a large percentage.

Peters Village is a new area of housing being constructed since 2014 to the south of the existing village on the former Peters Wouldham Hall Cement Works and in Peters Pit. It consists of 1000 houses grouped in three sectors: the Village Centre, Lower Peters Village and Upper Peters Village. It includes a new primary school, community centre, playing fields cycle way and riverside esplanade together with a new road bridge across the River Medway. The site is sensitive as it lies adjoining a Site of Special Scientific Interest and the North Downs AONB. The plans were approved in 2006 but postponed due to the economic downturn. Construction started on the infrastructure in 2014. The first apartments and houses were occupied in late 2017. The project, which received £19.5m from the government, is due to be completed by 2024. The new crossing over the River Medway to link with the A228 road, the Peters Bridge, opened in September 2016.

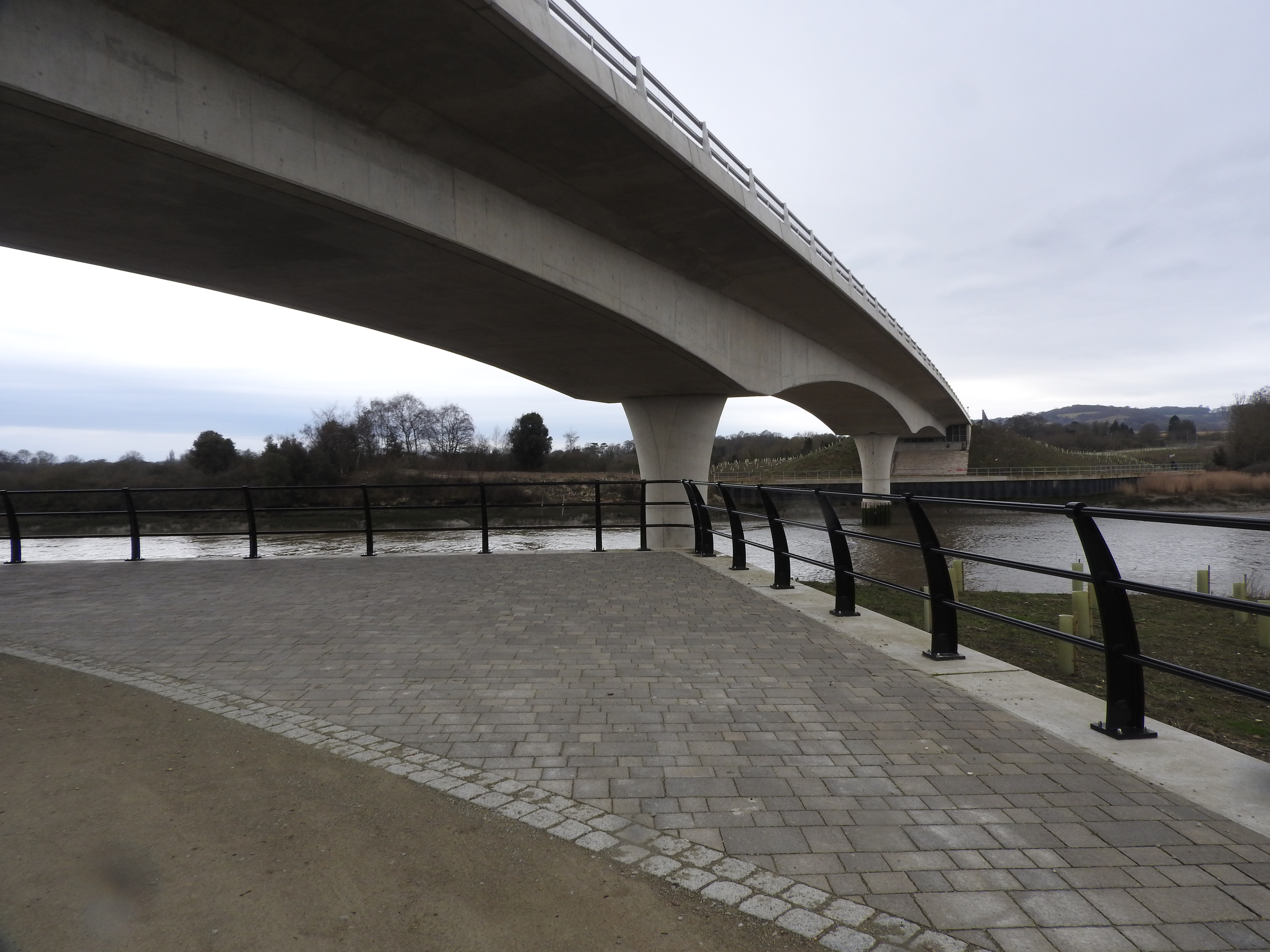
The Medway crossing: Peters Bridge 2018

== See also ==
- Listed buildings in Wouldham
