= Arthur William Devis =

English painter (1762–1822)

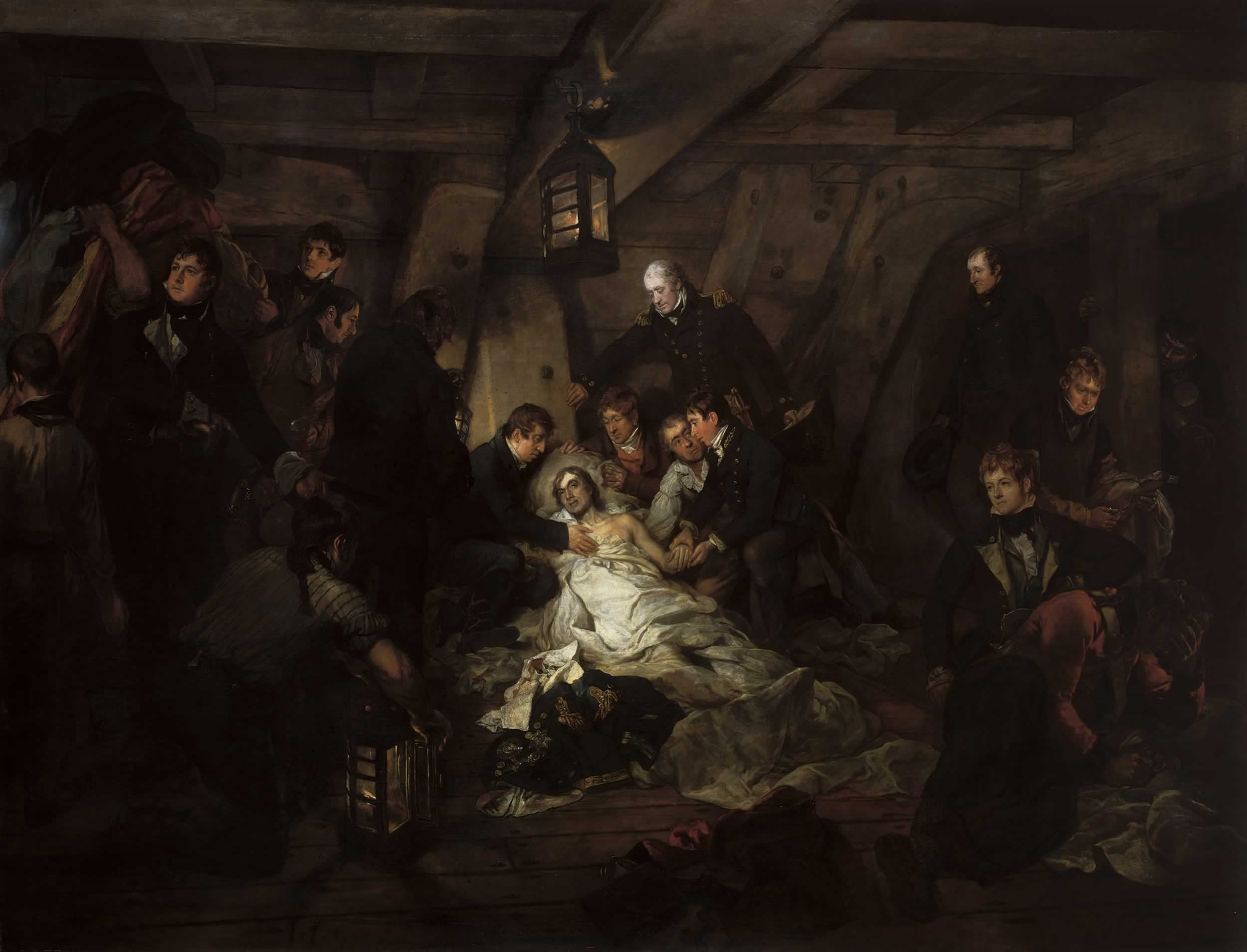
Arthur William Devis's Death of Nelson (1805)

Arthur William Devis (10 August 1762 – 11 February 1822) was an English painter of history paintings and portraits. He painted portraits and historical subjects, sixty-five of which he exhibited (1779–1821) at the Royal Academy. Among his more famous works are a depiction of the Death of Nelson and a posthumous portrait of Nelson.

== Life ==
Devis was born in London, the nineteenth child of the artist Arthur Devis and his wife Elizabeth Faulkner. Devis was the younger brother of the painter Thomas Anthony Devis (1757–1810) and of the schoolmistress and grammarian Ellin Devis (1746–1820), teacher, among others, of author of Maria Edgeworth and Frances Burney (later novelist Madame d'Arblay).

He followed his elder brother Thomas Anthony in becoming a pupil at the Royal Academy Schools in 1774 and like his brother exhibited at the Free Society of Artists, of which in 1768 their father had become president, and at the Royal Academy. Early on he came to the notice of Sir Joshua Reynolds.

He was appointed draughtsman on the British East India Company's packet Antelope in a voyage in 1783, under Captain Henry Wilson. In her he was injured in an encounter with Papuans near the Schouten Islands and was then wrecked on the Pelew Islands before proceeding to Canton and thence to Bengal. During his voyages, the artist received arrow wounds, one of which inflicted permanent injury on his lower jaw. During his time in Bengal, he painted a portrait of Sir William Jones, at the time a judge in Fort William. The painting now hangs at the British Library.

In 1794 Devis made what was considered an unwise marriage to an actress Anna Maria Coombes. Leaving his wife in India he decided to return to England in January 1795.

He was back in London by 1795 and is recorded on 21 July 1797 as living at 27 George Street, Hanover Square, where he was insured by the Sun Assurance Office.

His first wife Mrs Coombes travelled from India to Lisbon, then Paris and finally to Verdun where she died in a debtors prison in 1805. Devis married Margaret Lanchester at St Martin-in-the Fields on 26 August 1806. They had two daughters Ellin (1810-1826) and Isabella (1811-1885). Isabella married her cousin, author and poet Martin Farquhar Tupper.

He is noted for his involvement in the creation of the posthumous cult of Horatio Nelson. As she returned from Trafalgar, Devis went out to meet HMS Victory and was present on board the ship during the autopsy of Nelson's body conducted by Dr Beatty, the ship's surgeon. With the help of sketches he took at that time, he painted a heroic Death of Nelson, which proved a sensation.

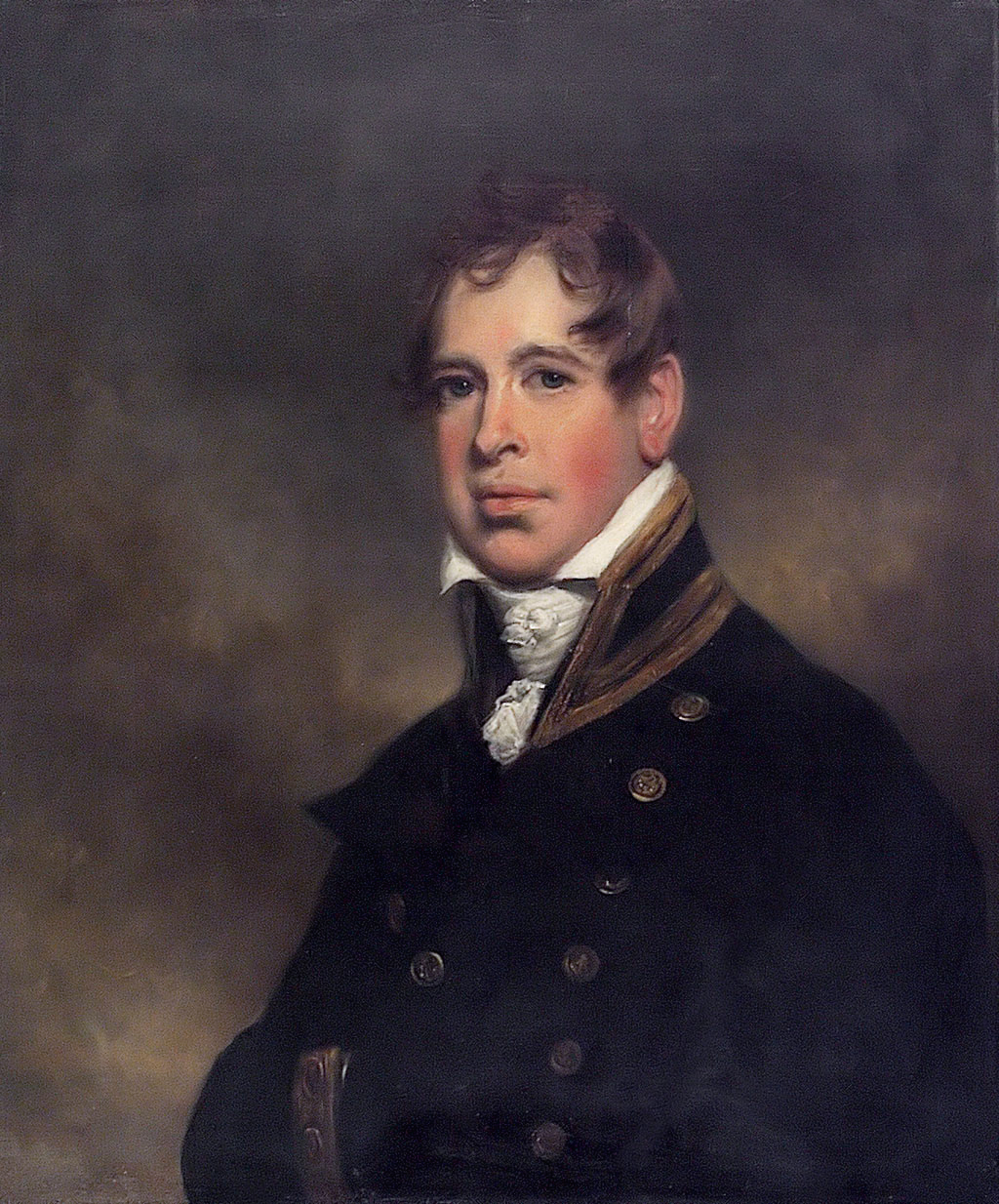
Sir William Beatty, Victory's surgeon at Trafalgar (1806)

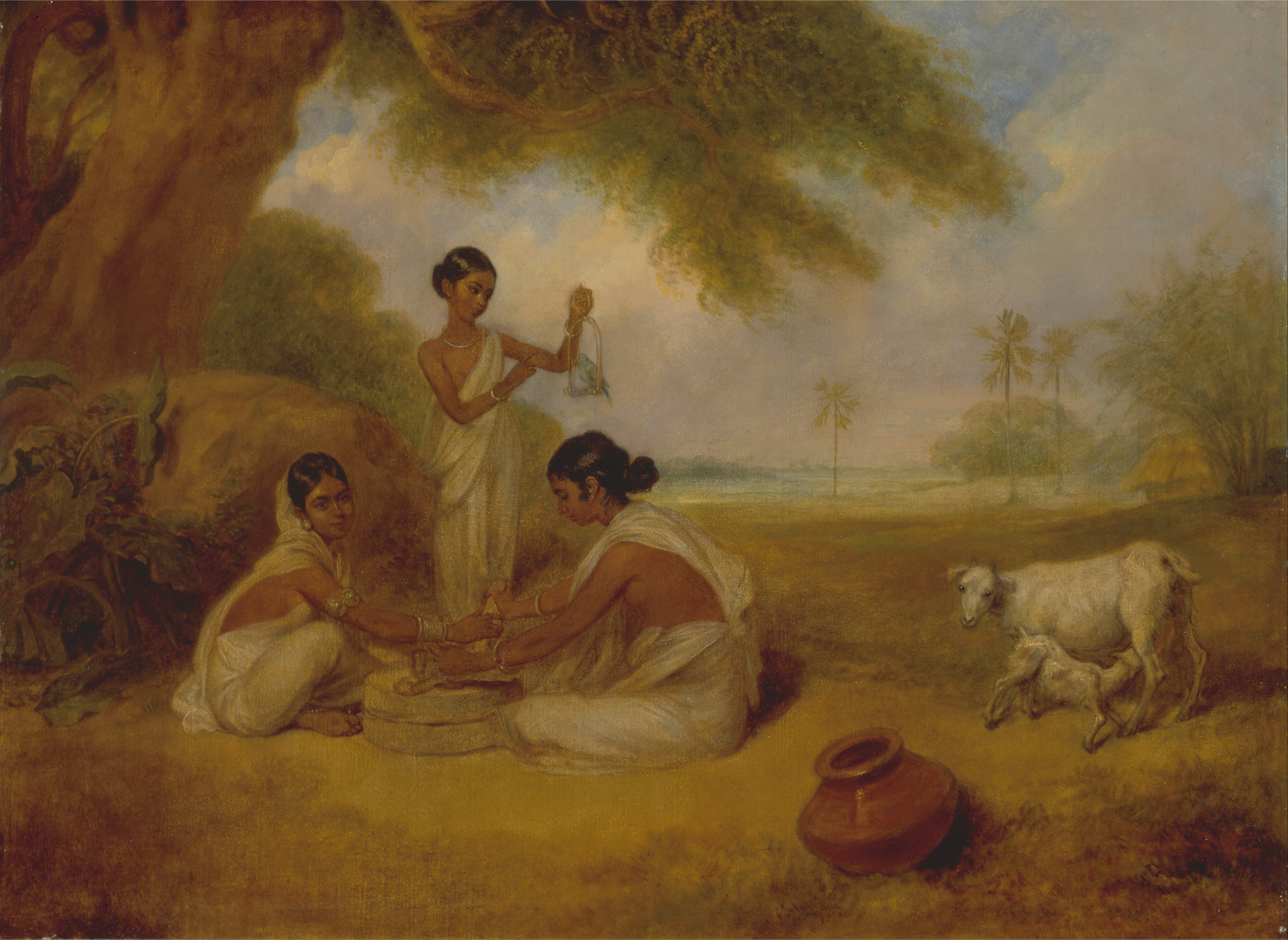
Grinding Corn

Devis also painted Dr Beatty, and was commissioned by him to produce a half-length painting of Nelson as vice-admiral, which he lent to Emma Hamilton (who later lost it in an accident whilst travelling). Either the original or a copy of this portrait was exhibited at the Royal Academy two years after the Battle and many copies were made of it. Lord Howe owned one, and another ended up in the collection of the National Maritime Museum. It also appeared as an engraving in Beatty's published account of Nelson's death.

Other work includes a portrait of King George III on horseback, and a range of portraits of admirals and generals, along with historical subjects, such as the Babington Plot and the signing of the Magna Carta. Better known is perhaps his Master Simpson (1780), a portrait of a small boy, James Alexander Simpson, carrying a dog which has often been copied, imitated and exploited commercially. Despite some success in life, Devis seems often to have had financial difficulties, including imprisonment for debt.

By the will of his brother Thomas Anthony Devis, who died in London in 1810, he inherited all Anthony's printed books and prints.

Devis himself died in London, at Caroline Street, Bedford Square, of apoplexy in 1822 and was buried in nearby St Giles-in-the-Fields churchyard, London.

== Gallery ==
Eliza O'Neill as Belvidera (1816)

Martin Farquhar Tupper

William Amherst, 1st Earl Amherst (1803)

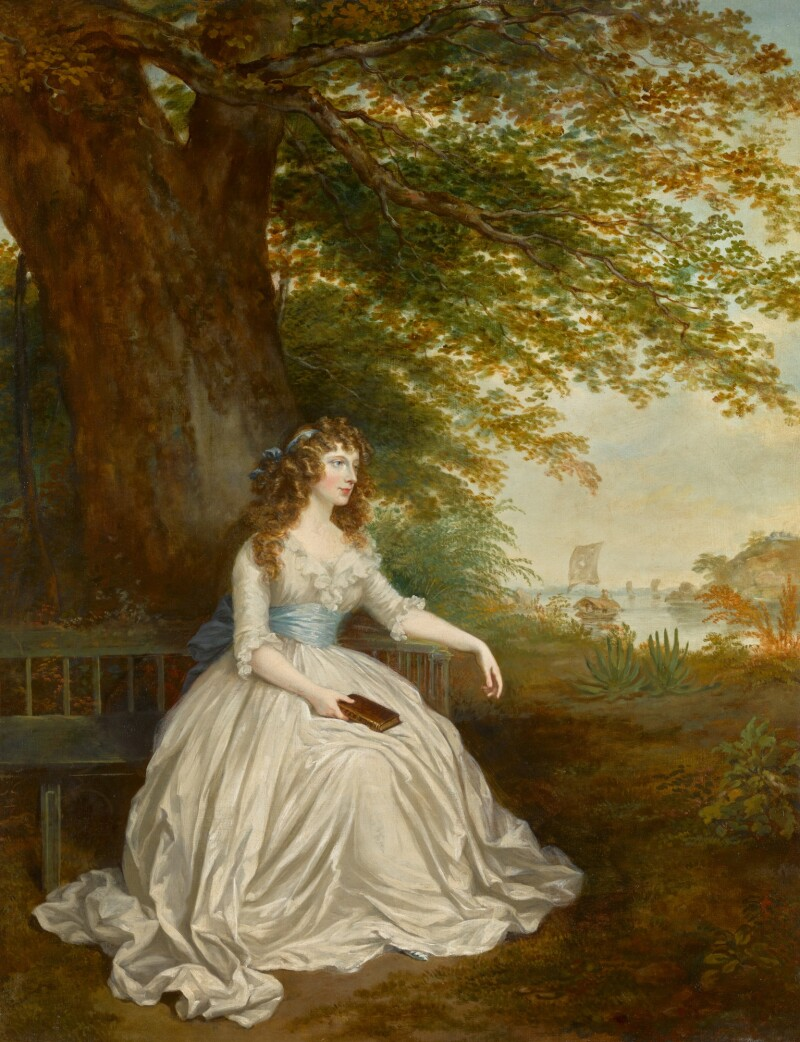
Portrait of Emily Shakespear

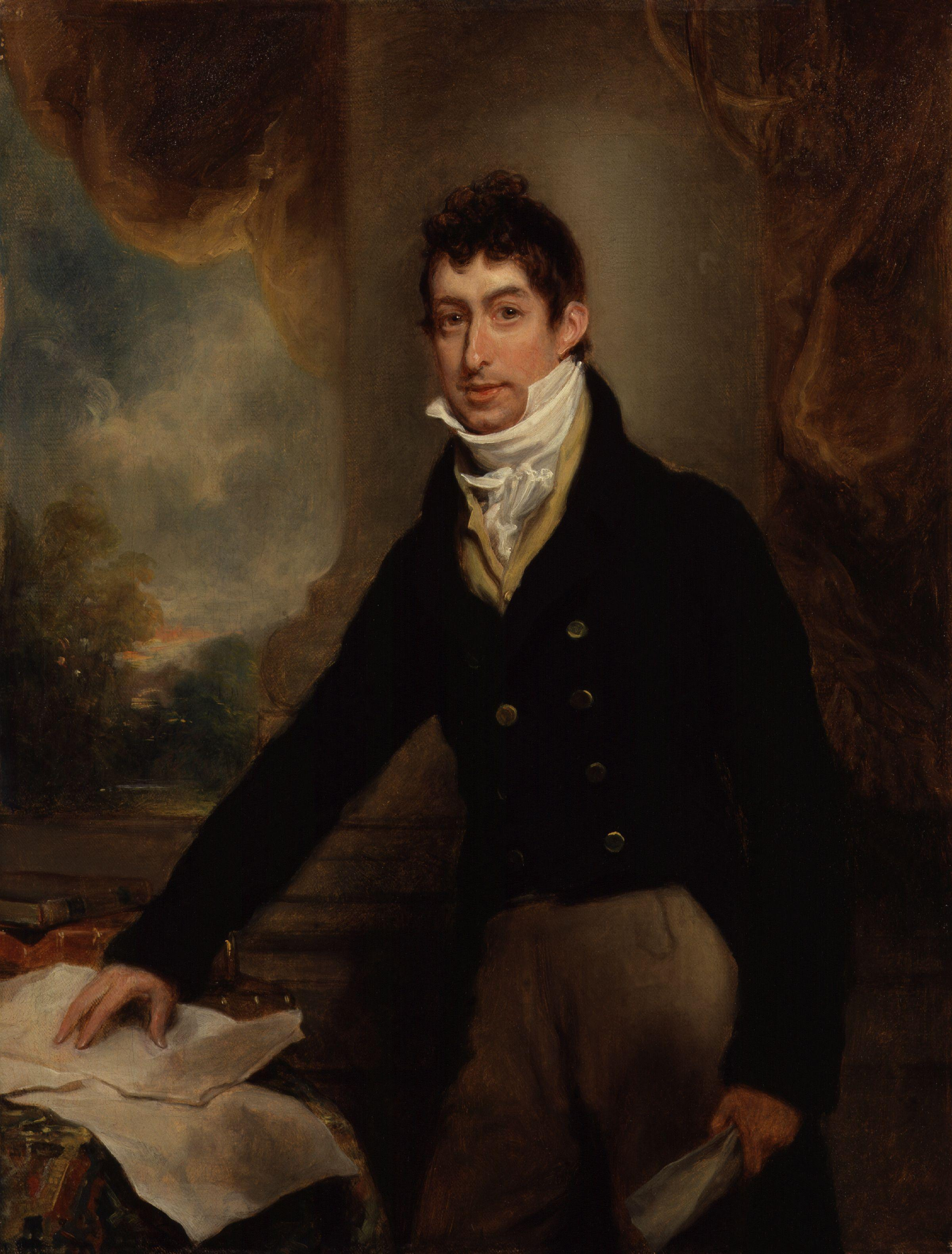
Gwyllym Lloyd Wardle (1809)

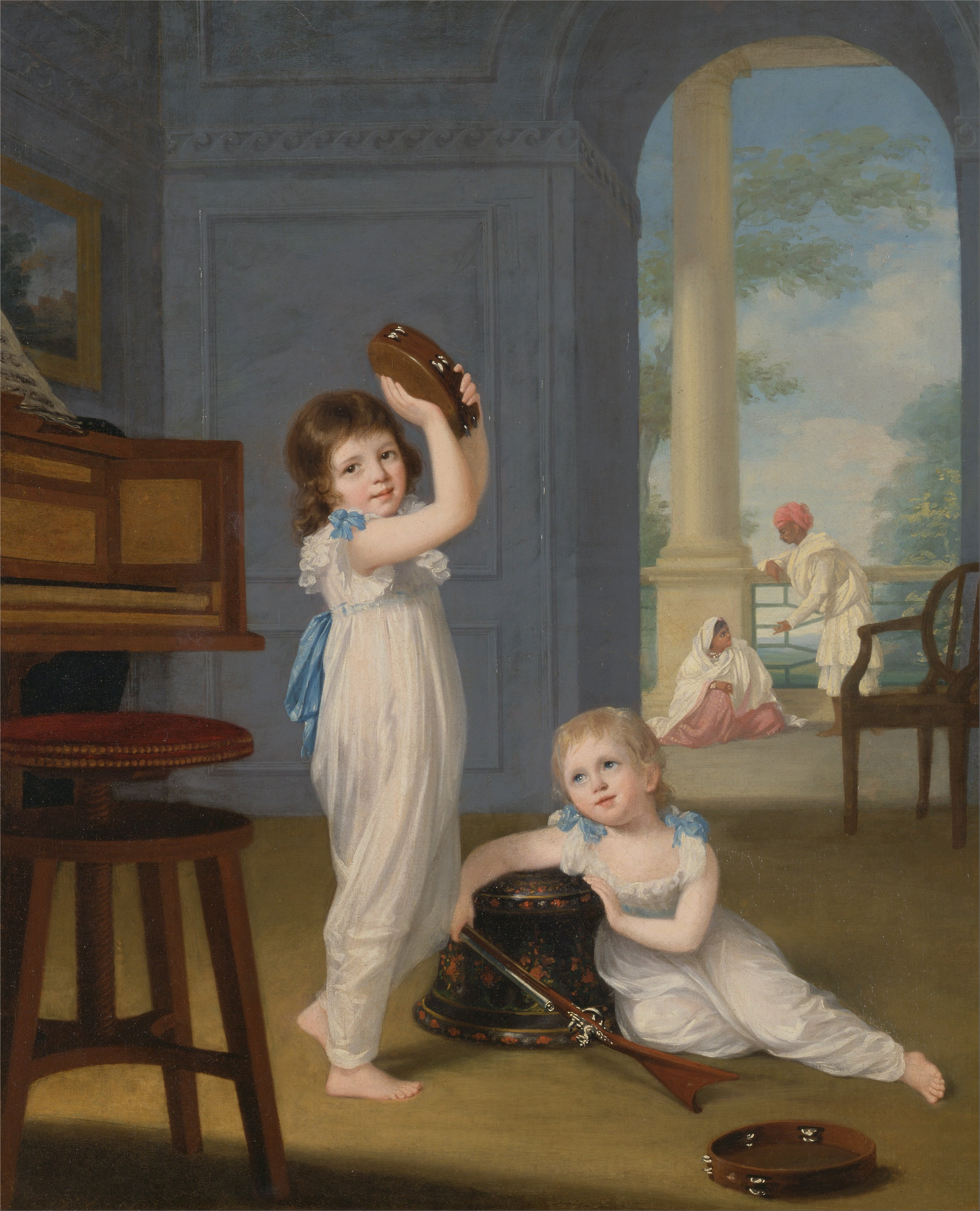
Emily and George Mason (1794–95)

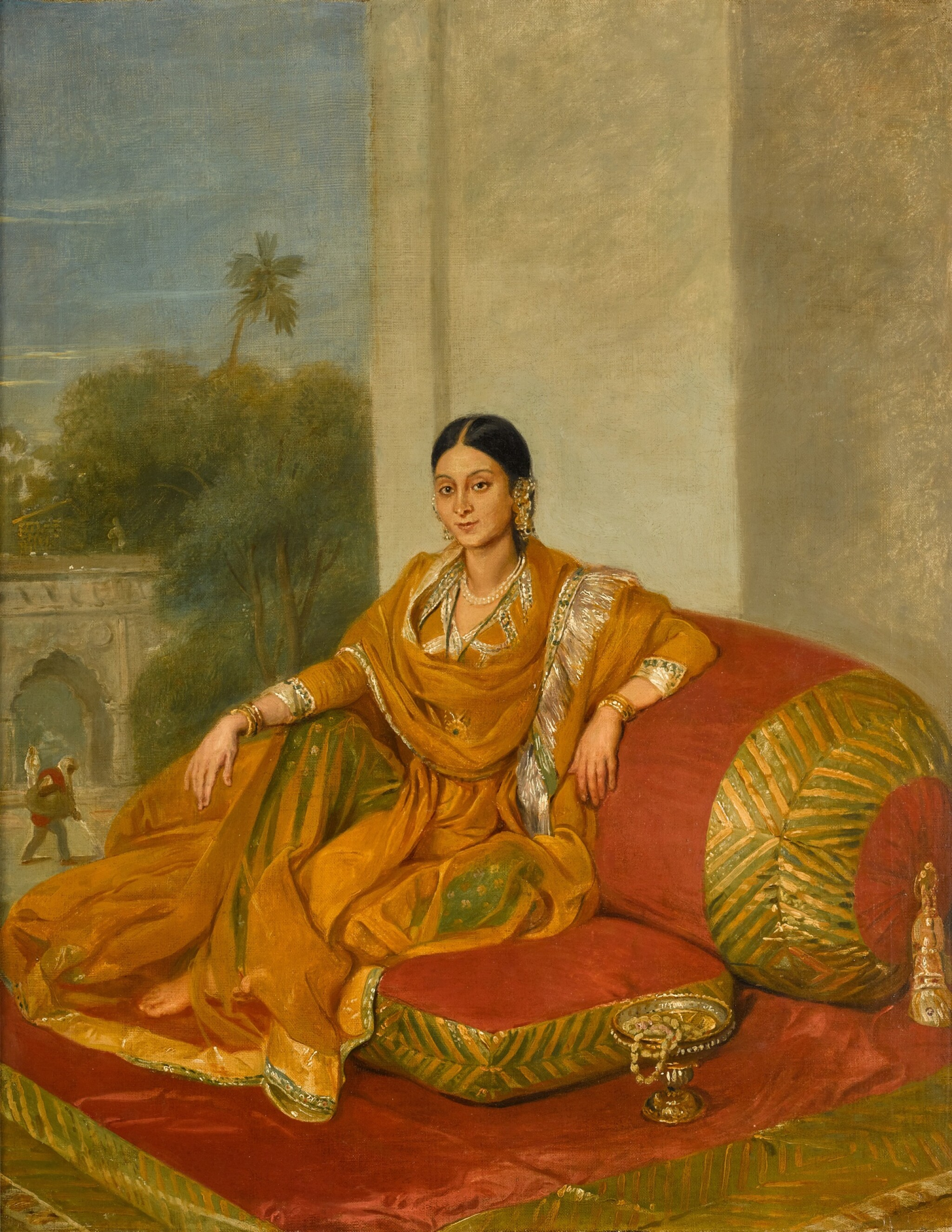
Portrait of an Indian Lady
