= William Beatty (surgeon) =

British naval surgeon (1773–1842)

Sir William Beatty
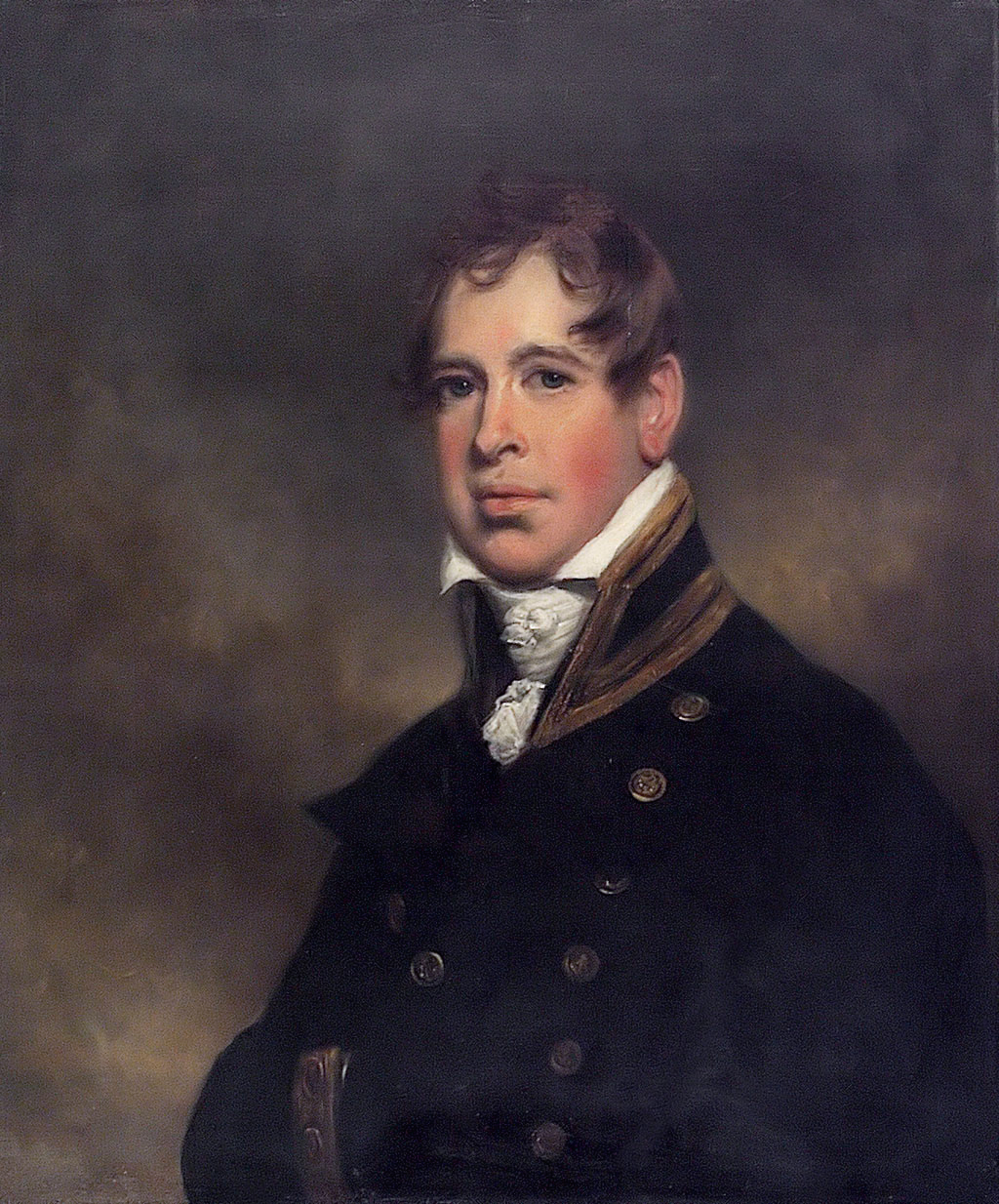
- Beatty c. 1806
- Born: April 1773; Derry, Ireland
- Died: 25 March 1842 (aged 68); London, England
- Burial place: Kensal Green Cemetery
- Military career
- Allegiance: United Kingdom
- Branch: Royal Navy
- Service years: 1791–1839
- Rank: Physician of the Fleet
- Conflicts: Battle of Trafalgar

Sir William Beatty FRS (April 1773 – 25 March 1842) was an Irish surgeon who served in the Royal Navy. Born in Derry, Ireland, he joined as a surgeon's mate in 1791 at the age of 18. He is best known as the ship's surgeon aboard HMS Victory during the Battle of Trafalgar, at which he witnessed the death of Admiral Horatio Nelson, and for writing an account of that battle – Authentic Narrative of the Death of Lord Nelson.

== Biography ==
=== Early life and education ===
William Beatty was the eldest son of James Beatty, an officer in the Irish Revenue Service, and Anne Smyth. He was born in the Waterside district of Derry, the eldest of four sons and two daughters.

No records survive of his education, though he attended a local school, most likely Foyle College, before beginning his medical studies. He may have been apprenticed to his uncle George Smyth, a half-pay naval surgeon in nearby Buncrana, before studying at either the University of Glasgow or at "The United Hospitals of the Borough" - the joint medical school of Guy's and St Thomas' Hospitals in London. What is known is that on 5 May 1791, the 18-year-old Beatty was examined before the London Company of Surgeons, and found qualified for employment by the Navy.

=== Surgeon's mate ===
Beatty was appointed second surgeon's mate aboard the 64-gun third-rate ship Dictator, but was soon reassigned, moving to the 32-gun frigate Iphigenia in September 1791. He was promoted to first surgeon's mate of the 32-gun frigate Hermione on 1 February 1793, the same day that Revolutionary France declared war on Britain.

The ship sailed for the Caribbean, where on 5 December 1793, he was appointed acting surgeon of the schooner Flying Fish. On 25 June 1794, he was appointed acting surgeon of the 28-gun frigate Alligator at Port-au-Prince, where he was immediately confronted with an epidemic of yellow fever in which 50 men, one-quarter of the crew, died. Alligator returned to England, where on 19 February 1795, Beatty was once again examined by the Company of Surgeons, and was judged qualified to serve as a ship's surgeon.

=== Ship's surgeon ===
Beatty was appointed to the 28-gun frigate Pomona on 8 March 1795, but soon fell foul of his captain the Hon. Augustus Fitzroy. On 19 July, a discussion over the status of two men whom Beatty had placed on the sick list quickly became acrimonious, with Fitzroy accusing Beatty of incompetence and contempt, before ordering him to be arrested. Beatty's court martial was convened aboard Malabar at the Nore on 4 August. After hearing the witnesses, which included the first and second lieutenants, a panel of 12 senior captains exonerated Beatty of all charges.

In September 1795, Beatty was posted to the 38-gun frigate Amethyst, but on 29 December, after barely three months, Amethyst was wrecked, having run aground near Guernsey in a heavy gale at night. The ship was forced to beach at Alderney. Beatty was more fortunate in his next posting, the 32-gun frigate Alcmene, which he joined on 26 March 1796. The ship saw action on the coast of Portugal and Spain, and in the Mediterranean, taking many prizes. On 17 October 1799, while cruising off Spain, Alcmene, along with the frigates Ethalion, Naiad, and Triton, fought and captured the Spanish frigates Thetis and Santa Brigida. The British were delighted to discover that the ships were loaded with gold bullion and other valuable cargoes, realizing prize money totalling £652,000. Beatty's share came to £2,468, equal to 40 times his annual pay.

Beatty left the Alcmene in March 1801, to serve aboard the 36-gun frigate Resistance until January 1802, when the Peace of Amiens was signed, and the war between France and England came an end. Beatty became a half-pay surgeon, receiving 2s. 6d a day.

The peace was short-lived, however, and the Britain declared war in May 1803. In July, Beatty was warranted surgeon of the 74-gun ship of the line Spencer, which was deployed in the blockade of Brest throughout the stormy winter months, and into the next year. In June 1804, Spencer, while blockading the north-western Spanish port of Ferrol, struck rocks and was forced to return to Plymouth for repairs, after which she was sent to the Mediterranean, arriving in August 1804 to join Nelson's blockade of the French fleet at Toulon. In December 1804, Beatty was appointed surgeon of the flagship Victory, succeeding fellow Ulsterman George Magrath, whom Nelson had appointed surgeon of the naval hospital at Gibraltar.

=== Battle of Trafalgar ===
On the day of the battle, 21 October 1805, Victory had 821 crewmen aboard, 62 of whom would be killed and 109 wounded. Beatty was personally called upon to undertake 11 amputations, mostly legs, actions that saved many lives. Only six wounded men subsequently died. However, when Nelson was himself wounded, Beatty did not administer treatment, claiming that he believed that the Admiral was beyond treatment.

The admiral had expressed the wish to be buried in his native soil, rather than simply being thrown in the sea like other mariners of the time. Beatty had to preserve the admiral's body for the voyage back to Britain, and decided to place it in a barrel of brandy. Beatty relates how gases from the corpse caused the barrel lid to open on 28 October 1805, alarming the posted marine guard. On arrival at Gibraltar, the barrel had to be topped up with spirits of wine because it had filled the cavities in the body. This incident may have led to the legend that British seamen had drunk the brandy surrounding the body. As Victory approached the Nore, Beatty performed an autopsy, removing the fatal musket ball (now in the Royal Collection at Windsor Castle) and later writing a report A Concise History of the Wound. Beatty then attended Nelson's state funeral in London. Victory was decommissioned in January 1806, and Beatty was posted as surgeon-in-charge of Sussex, the former HMS Union and now a hospital ship at Sheerness. There, he wrote his Authentic Narrative of the Death of Lord Nelson, which was eventually published in early 1807.

=== Physician of the fleet ===
Beatty was appointed physician of the Channel Fleet on 25 September 1806, having received the necessary medical degree from the University of Aberdeen on 28 February 1806. His duties were shore-based and mostly administrative, though in 1807, number of other naval surgeons and he were active in promoting the new practice of vaccination against smallpox. Beatty served in this capacity until August 1815 and the end of the war.

=== Later career ===
Beatty returned to his medical studies in Edinburgh between 1815 and 1817, gaining a second medical degree from the University of St Andrews on 14 October 1817 and becoming a licentiate of the Royal College of Physicians of London on 22 December 1817. He then served in civilian practice in Plymouth for the next five years. In April 1818 he was elected a member of the Linnean Society of London and was accepted as a Fellow of the Royal Society.

In September 1822, Beatty was appointed Physician at Greenwich Hospital, London, remaining there for the next 17 years, while also being appointed Physician Extraordinary to King George IV in Scotland, and in 1827 Physician Extraordinary to the Duke of Clarence, soon to become William IV, who presented him with a knighthood in 1831.

Beatty also became prominent figure in London's business and scientific community, becoming a director of the Clerical and Medical Insurance Company and of the London and Greenwich Railway, using his accumulated wealth to create a large collection of books and manuscripts.

=== Retirement and death ===
Beatty retired in July 1839, at the age of 66, and in recognition of his 41 years in service was awarded a pension of £200 per annum. He settled at 43 York Street, Paddington, London, and served as a member of the organising committee for the building of Nelson's Column in Trafalgar Square.

Beatty died in York Street on 25 March 1842 of acute bronchitis, unmarried. He was buried at Kensal Green Cemetery in an unmarked vault, at his own request. A memorial plaque identifying his grave was erected in the 1990s by the 1805 Club, a society dedicated to maintaining the memory of the men of Trafalgar.

== Media ==
Beatty was portrayed by Joe Dunlop in the 1982 ‘I Remember Nelson’ which focuses on Nelson’s Life but features Beatty during the Battle of Trafalgar in Episode 4.

Beatty was portrayed by Francis Magee in the 2005 Channel 4 documentary Trafalgar: Battle Surgeon, which focused on his actions during that battle.

Beatty's instrument case can be seen at the Royal College of Physicians and Surgeons of Glasgow.

== Bibliography ==
- Brockliss, Laurence; Cardwell, John & Moss, Michael (2005). Nelson's Surgeon: William Beatty, Naval Medicine, and the Battle of Trafalgar (PDF). Oxford, England: Oxford University Press. ISBN 0-19-928742-2.
