= Naval Gold Medal =

Awarded to senior officers of the Royal Navy

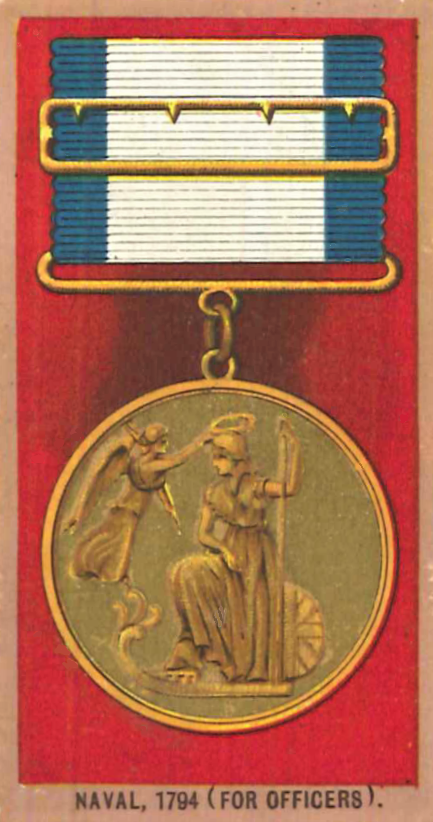
- Obverse, with suspension of the small medal
- Type: Campaign medal
- Awarded for: Command in battle
- Presented by: United Kingdom of Great Britain and Ireland
- Eligibility: Admirals and captains, Royal Navy
- Campaigns: French Revolutionary and Napoleonic Wars 1793–1814; Anglo-American War of 1812
- Clasps: None
- Established: 1794
- Total: 22 large and 117 small medals
- Ribbon

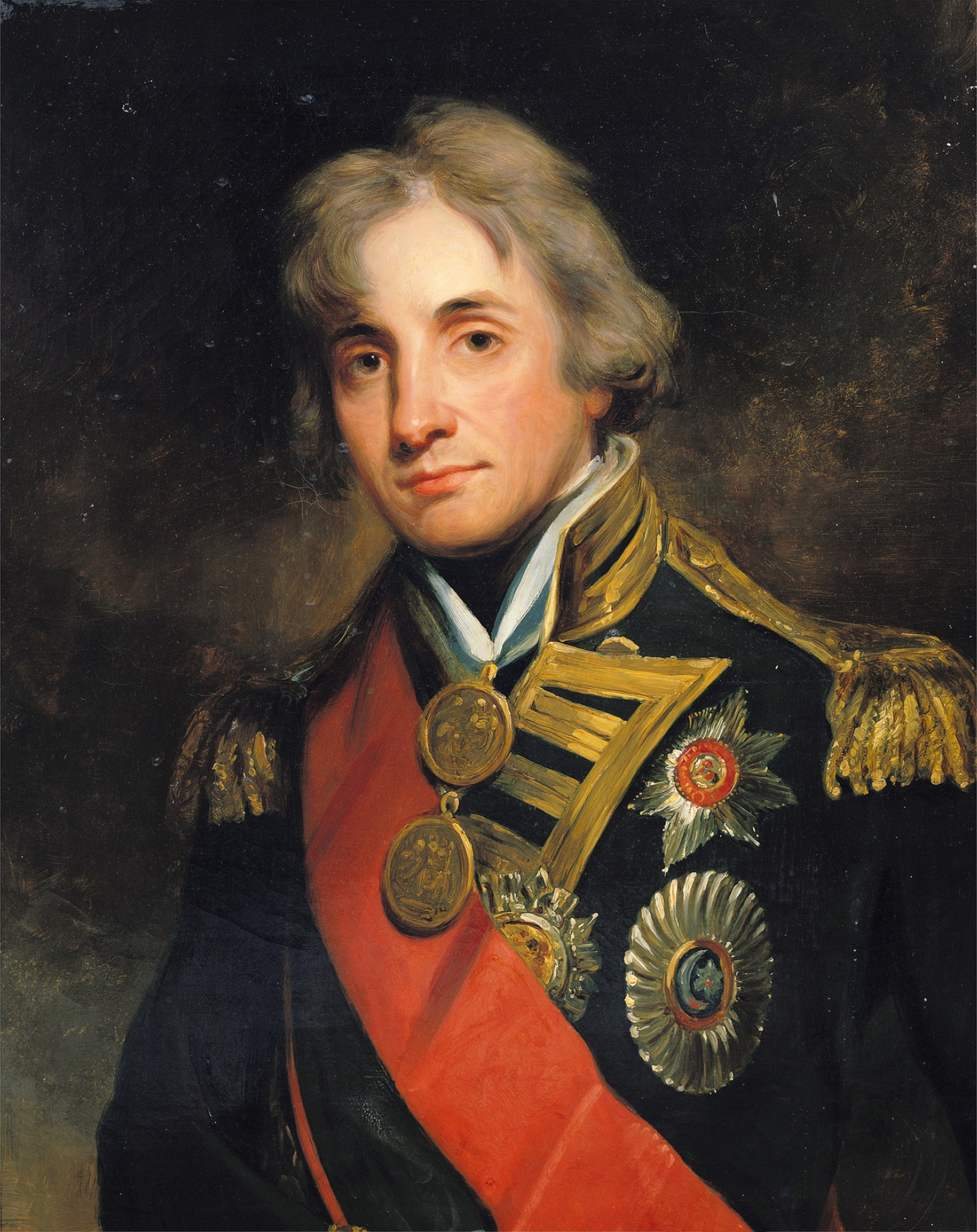
Horatio Nelson wearing large gold medals for St. Vincent and the Nile. With a later posthumous award for Trafalgar, he was the sole recipient of three large gold medals.

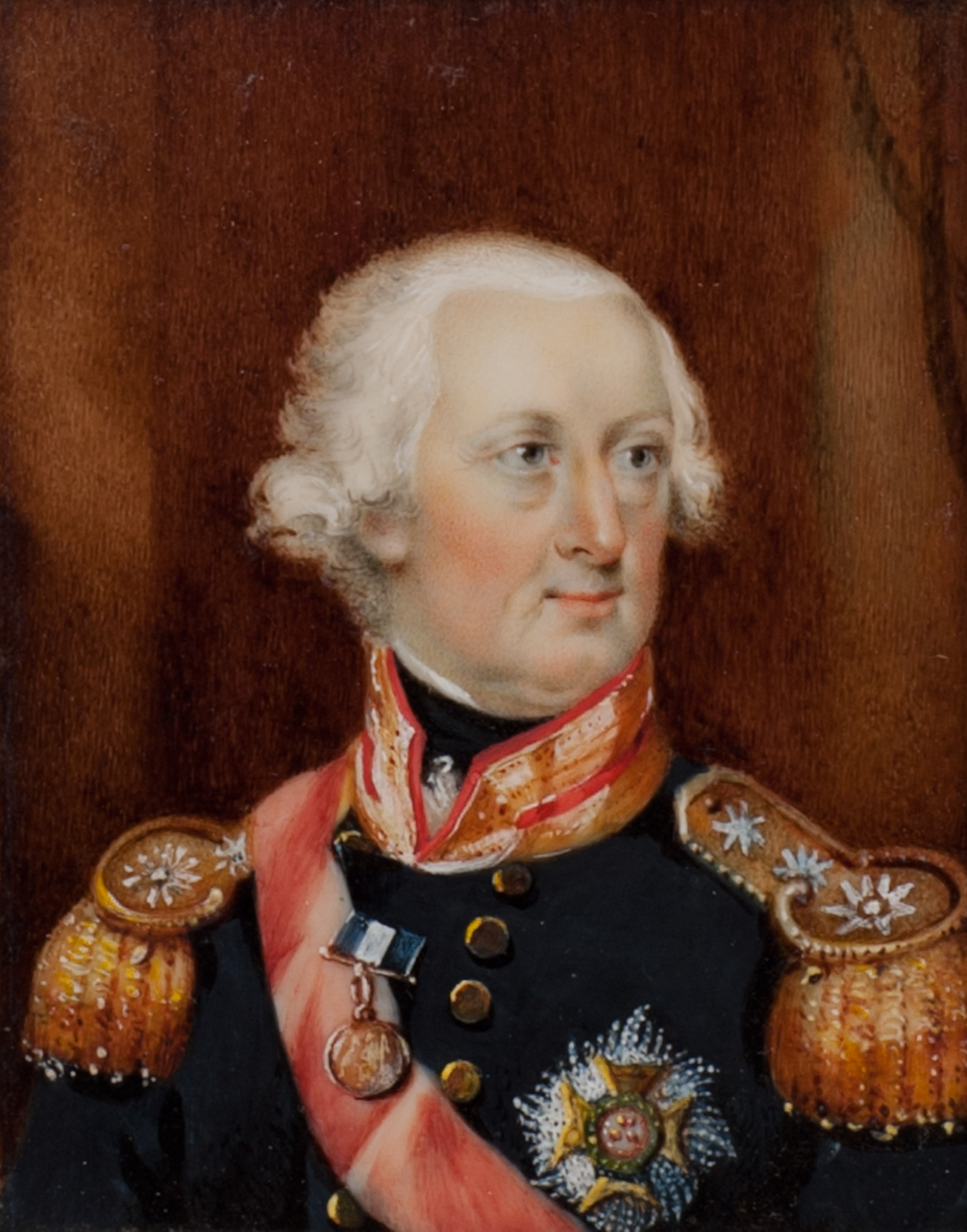
Sir Charles Knowles wearing a small gold medal for St. Vincent, where he commanded HMS Goliath.

The Naval Gold Medal was awarded between 1793 and 1815 to senior officers of the Royal Navy for specified actions.

Two different sizes were struck. 22 large medals were awarded to flag officers (admirals), commodores and captains of the fleet. 117 smaller medals were awarded to captains. As a separate medal was awarded for each action, it was possible for a recipient to receive and wear more than one.

Awards of the gold medal were discontinued after 1815, as would-be recipients became eligible for the Order of the Bath on its enlargement to three classes.

== Appearance ==
- Size: The large medal has a diameter of 2 inches (51 mm), and the small medal 1.3 inches (33 mm). Medals were mounted in a gold frame, glazed on both sides.
- Obverse: Britannia holding a spear and standing on the prow of an ancient galley, being crowned with a laurel wreath by a figure of Victory. Behind is an oval shield charged with the Union Flag.
- Reverse: Engraved with the rank and name of the recipient, and the event and date for which the medal was awarded. The large medal has a surround of a wreath of oak and laurel.
- Ribbon: White with dark blue edges, 1.75 inches (44 mm) wide for the large medal and 1.5 inches (38 mm) for the small. In 1847, this ribbon was used for the Naval General Service Medal.
- Suspension: Large medals had a ring suspension for wear around the neck. Small medals were worn on the left chest by way of a straight bar suspender, normally from a buttonhole. Six of the large medals awarded for the Glorious First of June were presented suspended from a gold chain.

== Awards ==
Adam Duncan, 1st Viscount Duncan's coat of arms augmented with the Naval Gold Medal after his victory at Camperdown

Following the Battle of the Glorious First of June 1794, the Naval Gold Medal was instituted to reward those admirals and captains who had been conspicuous for courage in that action, as well as those who might distinguish themselves on future occasions.

In spite of representations made by Nelson, no medal was authorised for the Battle of Copenhagen, due to concerns that it could offend the Danes.

Recipients surviving until 1847 were entitled to apply for the Naval General Service Medal with the appropriate clasps.

Gold Medals were issued by the Admiralty for the following actions. Only selected captains received a medal for the Glorious First of June, otherwise all captains or acting captains were recipients.

Action	Date	Large Medals	Small Medals
French Revolutionary Wars	1793–1802	–	–
Battle of the Glorious First of June	1 June 1794	8	17
Battle of Cape St Vincent	14 February 1797	6	15
Battle of Camperdown	11 October 1797	2	15
Battle of the Nile	1 August 1798	1	14
Recapture of HMS Hermione by HMS Surprise	25 October 1799	0	1
Napoleonic Wars	1803–1815	–	–
Battle of Trafalgar	21 October 1805	3	27
Battle of Cape Ortegal	4 November 1805	0	4
Battle of San Domingo	6 February 1806	2	8
Capture of the island of Curaçao by HMS Arethusa	1 January 1807	0	4
Capture of Turkish frigate Badere Zaffere by HMS Seahorse	5-6 July 1808	0	1
Capture of French frigate Thétis by HMS Amethyst	10 November 1808	0	1
Capture of French frigate Furieuse by HMS Bonne Citoyenne	6 July 1809	0	1
Capture of Banda Neira	9 August 1810	0	1
Battle of Lissa	13 March 1811	0	4
Capture of the French ship of the line Rivoli by HMS Victorious	22 February 1812	0	1
Capture of the French frigate Étoile by HMS Hebrus	27 March 1814	0	1
War of 1812	1812–1815	–	–
Capture of USS Chesapeake by HMS Shannon	1 June 1813	0	1
Capture of USS President by HMS Endymion	15 January 1815	0	1
Total		22	117

== Some notable recipients ==
Only three Naval officers earned three gold medals:

- Sir Edward Berry. Received three small gold medals, for the battles of the Nile, Trafalgar and San Domingo.
- Lord Collingwood. Received small gold medals for the battles of the Glorious First of June and St Vincent, and a large gold medal for Trafalgar.
- Viscount Nelson. Awarded three large medals, for the battles of St. Vincent, the Nile and posthumously for Trafalgar.

Other selected awards are listed below:

Large Gold Medal

- Viscount Duncan. Commanded British fleet at Camperdown
- Alexander Hood. Vice Admiral at the Glorious First of June
- Earl Howe. Commanded British fleet at the Glorious First of June
- John Jervis, Earl of St Vincent. Commanded British fleet at St Vincent

Small Gold Medal

- William Bligh, As captain of HMS Director, during the Battle of Camperdown, he captured Vrijheid, commanded by Vice-Admiral Jan Willem de Winter
- Philip Broke. As captain of HMS Shannon, he captured USS Chesapeake during the War of 1812
- Sir James Gambier. Commanded HMS Defence on the Glorious First of June
- Sir Edward Hamilton. As captain of HMS Surprise, he recaptured HMS Hermione
- Sir Charles Knowles. Commanded HMS Goliath at St Vincent
- William Mounsey. As captain of HMS Bonne Citoyenne, he captured the French frigate Furieuse
- George Murray. Commanded HMS Colossus at St Vincent
- Thomas Pringle. Commanded HMS Royal George on the Glorious First of June
- Sir Michael Seymour. As captain of HMS Amethyst, he captured the French frigate Thétis
- Robert Stopford. Commanded HMS Spencer at San Domingo
- Charles Tyler. Commanded HMS Tonnant at Trafalgar

== Bibliography ==
- Dorling, H. Taprell, Ribbons and Medals, (1956), A. H. Baldwin & Son
- Joslin, Edward C, Observer Book of British Awards and Medals, (1973), Frederick Warne & Co ISBN 0723215383
- Joslin, Litherland and Simpkin (eds), British Battles and Medals, (1988), Spink ISBN 0907605257
- Mayo, John Horsley (1897). Medals and Decorations of the British Army and Navy. A. Constable. "India Medal."
- Mussell, J (ed), Medals Yearbook 2016, (2015), Token Publishing. ISBN 9781908828248
- Royal Navy (1850). The Navy List. H.M. Stationery Office. OCLC 1604131. Contains (pp. 295–302) a complete list of medals awarded between 1793–1847.
- Oxford Dictionary of National Biography (2004) Oxford University Press. ISBN 0198613873 Contains biographies of most recipients of the Naval Gold Medal.
- "The Naval Gold Medal. Berryhill and Sturgeon website".
