= Cutting out of the Hermione =

1799 battle of the War of the Second Coalition

- Part of the War of the Second Coalition
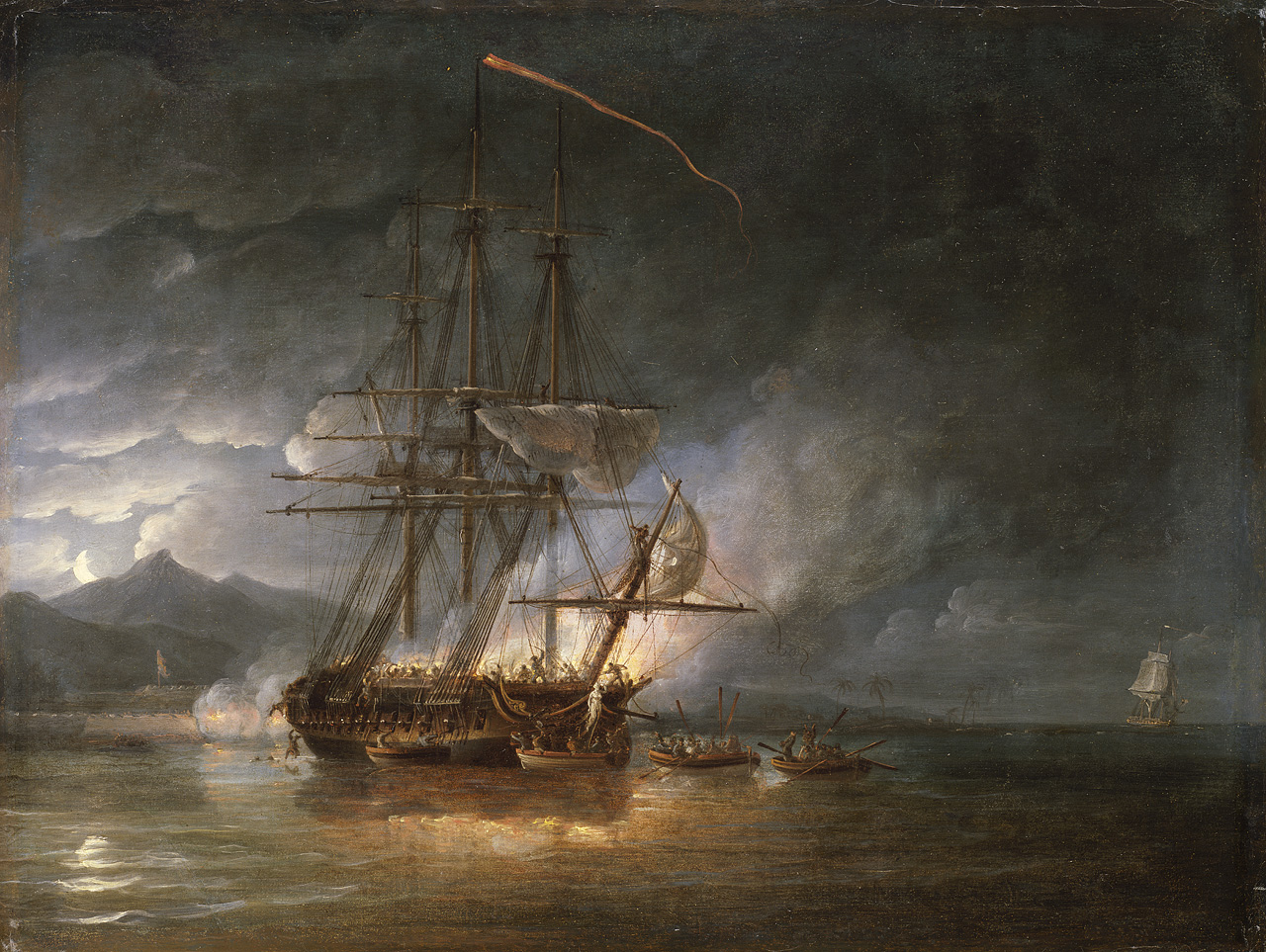
- Painting of the battle by Nicholas Pocock
Date	25 October 1799
Location	Puerto Cabello, Captaincy General of Venezuela
Result	British victory

Belligerents
Great Britain	Spain

Commanders and leaders
Edward Hamilton	Ramón Echalaz (POW)

Strength
100	~400; 1 frigate

Casualties and losses
12 wounded	120 killed 97 wounded 231 captured 1 frigate captured

The cutting out of the Hermione (also known as the capture of Hermione) was a naval action that took place at Puerto Cabello, Venezuela on 25 October 1799. The formerly British frigate HMS Hermione, which had been handed over to the Spanish by its crew following a vicious mutiny, lay in the heavily guarded sea port of Puerto Cabello, now under the command of Captain Ramón Echalaz.

A British frigate, HMS Surprise, was sent under Edward Hamilton to recapture Hermione. In naval terms this was called a cutting out operation—a boarding attack by small boats, preferably at night and against an unsuspecting and anchored target. This had become a popular tactic during the later 18th century.

== Background ==
HMS Hermione was a frigate of the Royal Navy, commanded by Captain Hugh Pigot. In September 1797 a number of the crew had risen up against the tyrannical Pigot and had murdered him and nine other officers, throwing their bodies overboard. Fearing retribution for their actions, the mutineers had sailed Hermione to the Spanish port of La Guaira, and handed her over to the Spanish. The mutineers claimed they had set the officers adrift in a small boat, as had happened in the mutiny on Bounty some eight years earlier.

The Spaniards took Hermione into service under the name Santa Cecilia, where she remained for two years at La Guaira. Her crew, which included 25 of her former crew, remained under Spanish guard.

Meanwhile, news of the fate of Hermione reached Admiral Sir Hyde Parker when HMS Diligence captured a Spanish schooner. Parker wrote to the governor of La Guaira, demanding the return of the ship and the surrender of the mutineers but the governor only moved the ship to Puerto Cabello. Meanwhile, Parker dispatched HMS Magicienne under Captain Henry Ricketts to commence negotiations. Parker also set up a system of informers and posted rewards that eventually led to the capture of 33 of the mutineers. News eventually reached Parker that Santa Cecilia had been sighted in Puerto Cabello, and ordered HMS Surprise to intercept her, should she attempt to put to sea.

Captain Edward Hamilton of Surprise decided that the honour of the Royal Navy depended on the recovery of the ship, and was determined to retake her. Anchoring near the port, he devised a plan to cut her out of the harbour, and asked for a boat and an extra twenty men from Parker. Parker declared the scheme too risky, and refused to send the men, but Hamilton went ahead anyway.

== Battle ==
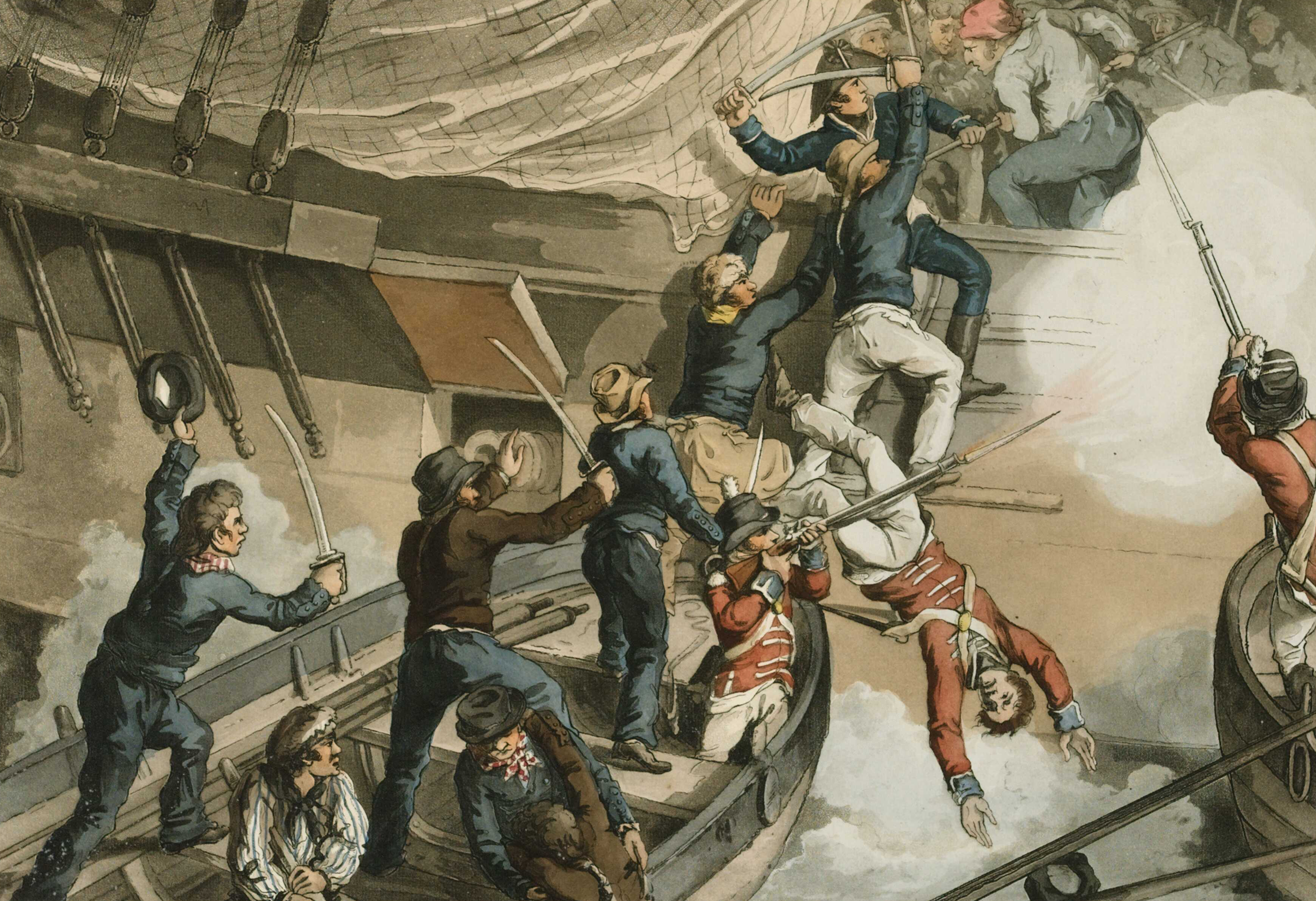
Santa Cecilia being boarded by British marines and sailors in Puerto Cabello

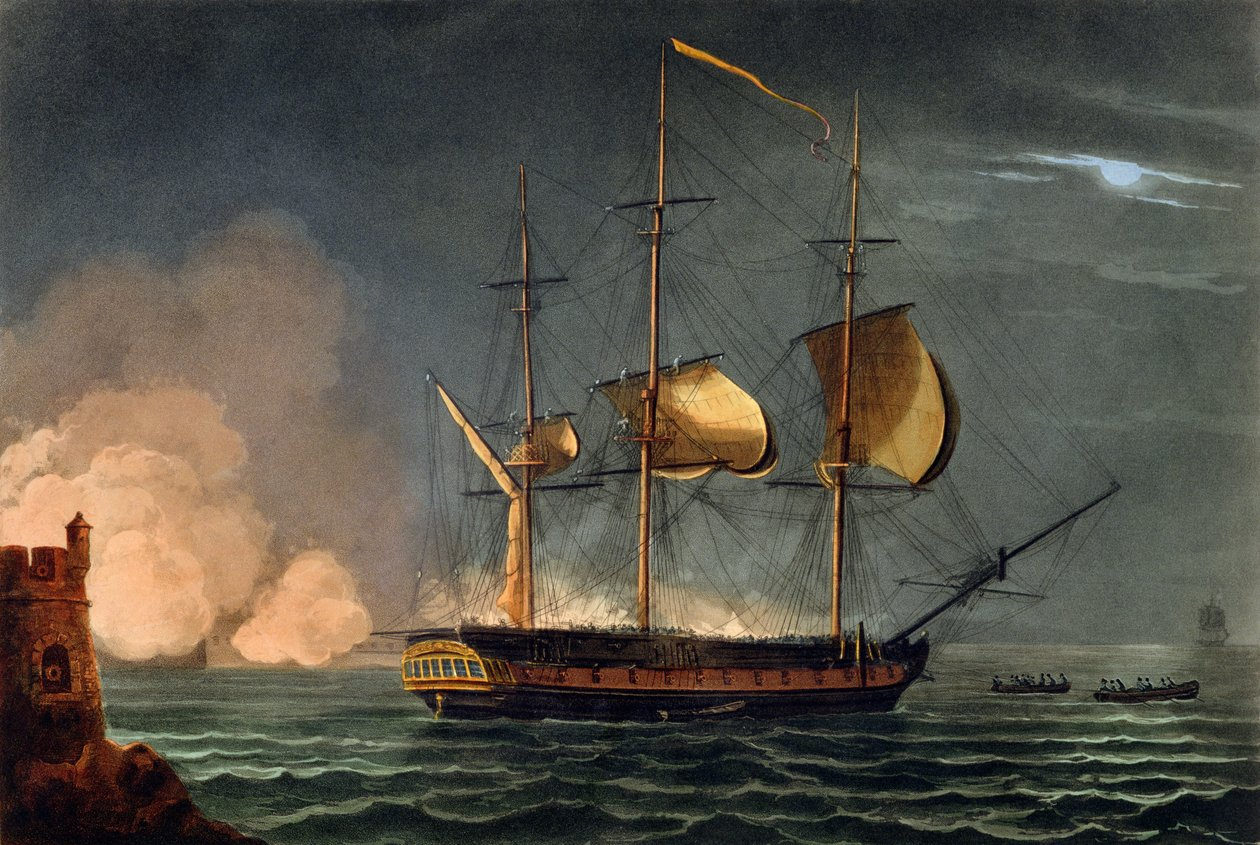
Santa Cecilia is sailed out from Puerto Cabello after being secured - print by Thomas Whitcombe

Santa Cecilia was heavily manned, with around 400 Spanish under the command of Captain Ramón Echalaz. She lay under the guns of two shore batteries, together mounting some 200 guns. Hamilton meticulously planned the capture. He had a force of some 100 seamen and marines in his boats, all of whom were clothed in dark only, with no white or light colours. Each of the boats was placed in a formation of two divisions, and were towed in threes. One division would attack the starboard side while the other was to board the larboard side. Each boat was given as a specific task a part of the ship which they were responsible for securing.

Stealth was a key part of the attack plan, but Hamilton did not achieve this because, as he led his boats for the attack, he was spotted by two Spanish gunboats. In addition, some of the boats were caught in a boom, a floating barrier. They soon got free, but this alerted the Spanish shore batteries, which opened fire. With the alarm given, the crew of Santa Cecilia were ready for the British as the boats got alongside her. As the British approached, the Spanish kept up a brisk fire of musketry but fired on their own gun boats as well as the attacking British, which caused confusion among both sides.

Nevertheless, Santa Cecilia was boarded. Initially, the first party to board was pushed back, and Hamilton was alone on the quarterdeck fighting four Spaniards. A musket butt soon knocked him down. At this moment the other division had swung around, and they too boarded the ship. This included the Marines, who, with a single volley, rushed the main deck and saved Hamilton. They then charged with the bayonets, driving the Spaniards from the top decks. The Spaniards were then caught in a crossfire, which drove them below deck. The fight continued in the heart of the ship. As the fight below deck continued, Hamilton's sailors were cutting the cables holding Santa Cecilia at bay, and the sails were loosed to catch the breeze.

Echalaz was wounded, captured, and taken below, despite some resistance by a few who tried to take back the ship. The rest of the Spanish surrendered soon after Echalaz was captured. The batteries surrounding Puerto Cabello opened fire when they saw the ship sailing away, and scored a number of hits on the ship, but no major damage was done. Hamilton ordered no shots to be fired, and no light to be shown. This tactic worked and Santa Cecilia sailed out of danger. By 2:00 a.m., the battle was over and fire from the shore batteries had died down. The boats with Santa Cecilia met up with HMS Surprise by 3:00 a.m.

== Aftermath ==
The Spanish had lost 120 killed, while 231 were taken prisoner, 97 of whom were wounded. All but Echalaz and two other Spanish officers were subsequently returned to the port the next day. Another fifteen Spaniards escaped by jumping overboard and swimming ashore, while a further 20 escaped in a launch that had been guarding the ship. By contrast the British had not lost a single man, and had just twelve wounded, four of them seriously. One of them was Hamilton himself, who had suffered a blow to the head from a musket, and wounds from a sabre, pike and grapeshot. Parker had the recaptured Hermione renamed HMS Retaliation, after which the Admiralty ordered her to be renamed HMS Retribution on 31 January 1800. The prize money was distributed, making Hamilton a rich man, so much so that he declined a pension.

For his daring exploit, Hamilton was made a knight by letters patent, a Knight Commander of the Order of the Bath (2 January 1815), and eventually became a baronet (20 October 1818). The Jamaica House of Assembly awarded him a sword worth 300 guineas, and the City of London awarded him the Freedom of the City in a public dinner on 25 October 1800. In 1847, the Admiralty awarded Hamilton a gold medal for the recapture of Hermione, and the Naval General Service Medal with the clasp, "Surprise with Hermione", to the seven surviving claimants from the action.

== Bibliography ==
- Colledge, J. J.; Warlow, Ben (2006) [1969]. Ships of the Royal Navy: The Complete Record of All Fighting Ships of the Royal Navy from the 15th Century to the Present (3rd Rev ed.). London: Chatham Publishing. ISBN 978-1-86176-281-8. OCLC 67375475.
- Dye, Ira (1994). The Fatal Cruise of the Argus: Two Captains in the War of 1812. Naval Institute Press. ISBN 1-55750-175-0.
- Fitchett, William Henry (2007). Deeds that Won the Empire: Historic Battle Scenes. BiblioBazaa. ISBN 978-1-4264-9632-5.
- Guttridge, Leonard F. (2006). Mutiny: A History of Naval Insurrection. Naval Institute Press. ISBN 1-59114-348-9.
- Henderson III, James (1994). The Frigates: An Account of the Lighter Warships of the Napoleonic Wars. Pen and Sword. ISBN 9780850524321.
- Jeans, Peter D. (2004), Seafaring Lore and Legend: A Miscellany of Maritime Myth, Superstition, Fable, and Fact, Camden, Me: McGraw-Hill Professional, ISBN 0-07-143543-3, OCLC 54079892
- Lavery, Brian; Hunt, Geoff (2009). The Frigate Surprise: The Complete Story of the Ship Made Famous in the Novels of Patrick O'Brian. W.W. Norton & Company. ISBN 9780393070095.
- Pope, Dudley (1988). The Black Ship. Secker and Warburg. ISBN 0-436-37753-5.
- Pyle, Christopher H. (2001). Extradition, Politics, and Human Rights. Temple University Press. ISBN 1-56639-823-1.
- Tracy, Nicholas (2006). Who's who in Nelson's Navy: 200 Naval Heroes. London: Chatham Publishing. ISBN 1-86176-244-5.
- Winfield, Rif (2007). British Warships of the Age of Sail 1714–1792: Design, Construction, Careers and Fates. Seaforth. ISBN 978-1-86176-295-5.
- Woodman, Richard (2005). A Brief History of Mutiny. Running Press. ISBN 0-7867-1567-7.
