= Hugh Pigot (Royal Navy officer, born 1769) =

Royal Navy officer (1769–1797)

Captain Hugh Pigot
- Born: 5 September 1769; Patshull, Staffordshire
- Died: 21 September 1797 (aged 28); Aboard HMS Hermione, off Puerto Rico
- Relatives: Hugh Pigot (father)
- Military career
- Allegiance: Great Britain
- Branch: Royal Navy
- Service years: 1782–1797
- Rank: Captain
- Commands: HMS Swan; HMS Success; HMS Hermione

Captain Hugh Pigot (5 September 1769 – 21 September 1797) was a Royal Navy officer. Through his connections and their patronage, he was able to rise to the rank of captain, despite poor leadership skills and a reputation for brutality. Historian William James stated that "he has been described to us by those who knew him well, as one of the most cruel and oppressive captains belonging to the British navy."

While Pigot was captain of the frigate HMS Hermione, he eventually provoked his men to mutiny. This mutiny became the bloodiest in the history of the Royal Navy and left Pigot and nine other officers dead. The Navy hunted down and executed a number of the mutineers and recaptured his ship from the Spanish, to whom the mutineers had turned it over.

== Family and early life ==
Pigot was born in Patshull, Staffordshire, on 5 September 1769, the second son of Admiral Hugh Pigot. His mother was Hugh's second wife, Frances, who was the daughter of Sir Richard Wrottesley. The younger Hugh embarked on his naval career on 10 March 1782, when he joined the 50-gun HMS Jupiter as an admiral's servant. He sailed from the Hamoaze with Jupiter to the West Indies, where his father was flying his flag aboard the 90-gun HMS Formidable. Pigot was advanced to midshipman or masters' mate on 1 October 1784, and received his commission as lieutenant on 21 September 1790. He received his first command, that of the sloop HMS Swan, on 10 February 1794, and was assigned to operate on the Jamaica station.

== First commands ==
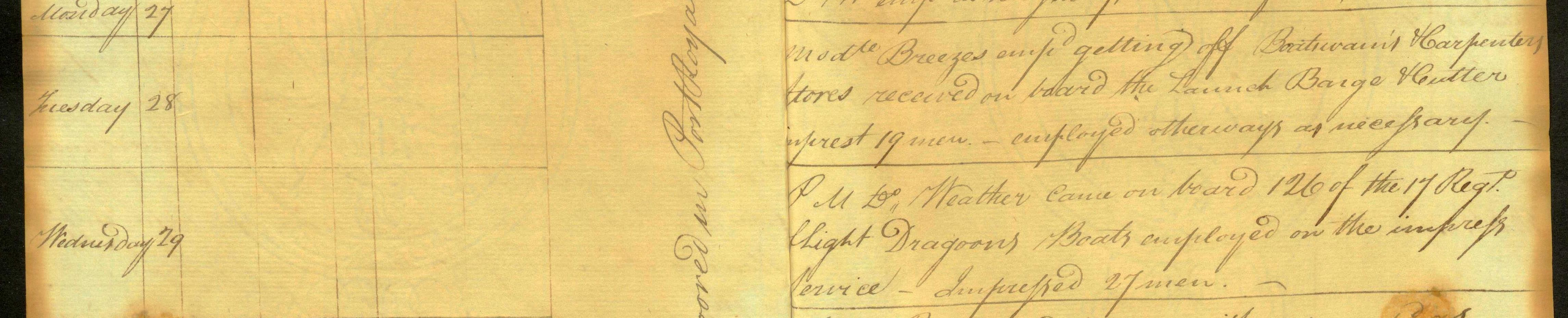
HMS Success log August 1795, notations list number of seamen impressed on 28 and 29 August 1795

Whilst in command of Swan, Pigot rammed the merchant ship Canada in the English Channel in May 1794. He placed the blame for the mishap on the master of the merchant vessel. Four months later Pigot was posted to the 32-gun HMS Success as her captain. During a nine-month period, he ordered at least 85 floggings, the equivalent of half the crew; subsequently two of these men died from their injuries. Writer Dudley Pope has pointed out that beyond the frequency of flogging was Captain Pigot's "complete lack of balance". Pope noted for example that in April 1795, a seaman on HMS Success, was given twenty four lashes for mutiny, one of the worst offenses in the Royal Navy apart from murder or treason, yet three sailors in the same month were given twenty four lashes for drunkenness, one of the most common infractions. Like other British naval vessels operating in the Caribbean, Captain Pigot increasingly became reliant on impressing merchant seamen to fill out his crew.

In July 1795 he was involved in another collision with Mercury, an American ship, near Santo Domingo. He again blamed the master of the other ship. But when he had the man seized and flogged he created a diplomatic incident. Pigot was brought before a court-martial but then acquitted following an apology. He was initially to return to England after this, but Admiral Sir Hyde Parker, then in command at Jamaica, thought that Pigot had been represented badly and allowed him to transfer to the 32-gun HMS Hermione instead.

== Hermione ==
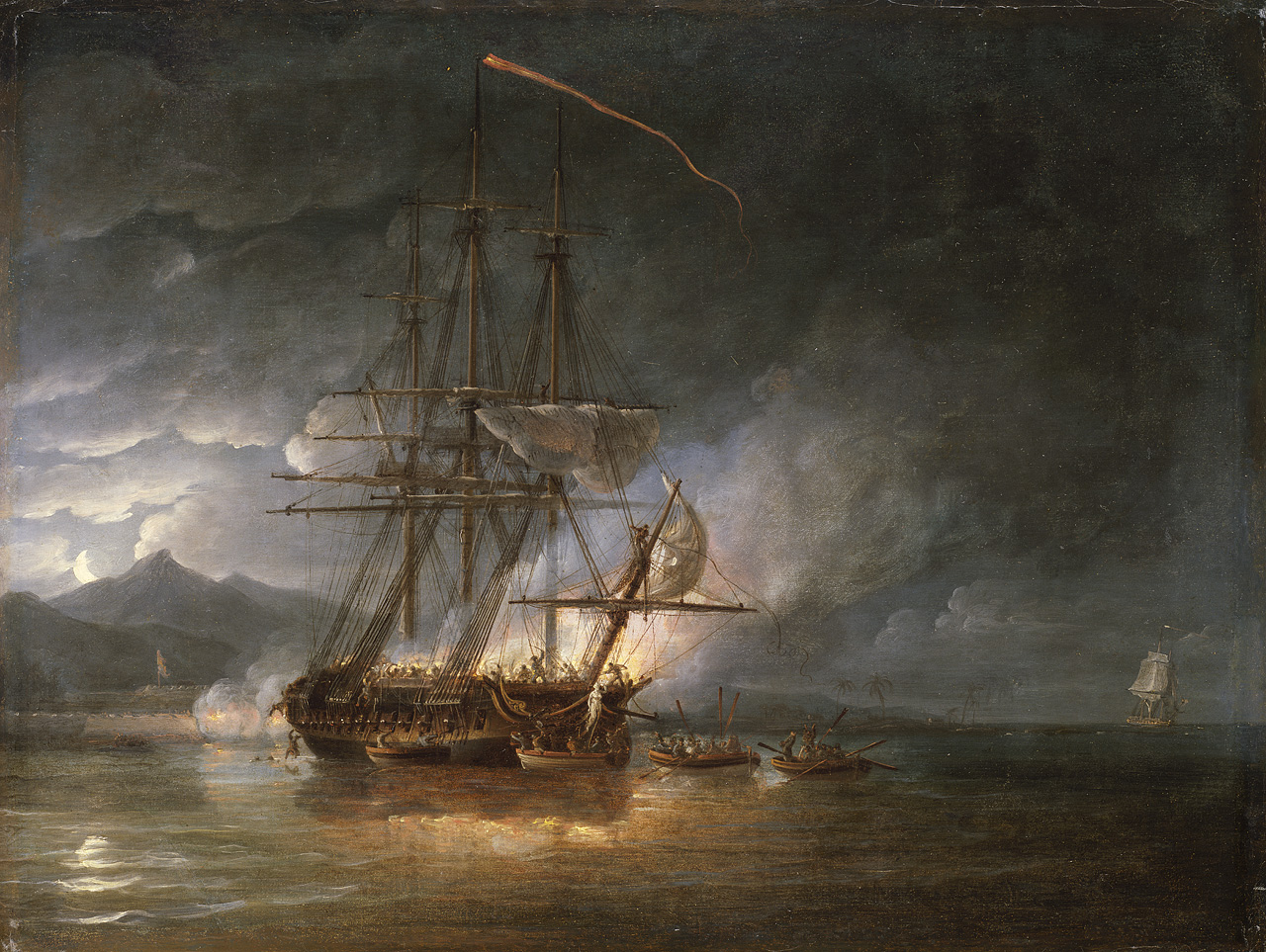
Santa Cecilia, the former Hermione, being cut out at Puerto Cabello by boats from HMS Surprise

Pigot took command of HMS Hermione on 10 February 1797, making a habit of giving preferential treatment to members of the crew who had previously served under him. The ship was sent to patrol the Mona Passage between the Dominican Republic and Puerto Rico. Pigot destroyed three privateers at Puerto Rico on 22 March 1797. In April, Pigot, aboard Hermione and acting in company with HMS Mermaid, HMS Drake, HMS Penelope and HMS Quebec, succeeded in cutting out nine merchant ships at the Battle of Jean-Rabel under fire from enemy batteries without losing a single man. Pigot's dispatch to the Admiralty did not mention the contributions that other ships and officers had made to the operation. In an incident in May 1797, Hermione narrowly escaped being wrecked thanks to the efforts of one of her lieutenants, Harris, but a ship sailing in company with the Hermione went aground. Pigot blamed Harris, however, and insisted upon an inquiry. Though Harris was exonerated, he immediately left the ship to serve on another. Pigot had by now developed a reputation for excessive brutality. On 6 September 1797, and in company with HMS Diligence and HMS Renommee, his ship captured a 6-gun Spanish privateer.

=== Mutiny ===
Midshipman David Casey was an experienced midshipman who had served with credit under Captain Pigot during the previous months, but his dis-rating was a primary trigger to the mutiny. About a week before the mutiny, Casey was at his station on the main top, and the captain noticed a reef knot which had not been tied by one of the sailors under his supervision. Casey was brought before the captain, and while he took full responsibility for it, Pigot demanded that Casey get on his knees and beg for forgiveness. This would have been a terrible insult for a gentleman, and Casey refused. The captain gave him 12 lashes, and he was disrated, which would end his career as a naval officer. The crew felt Casey was punished unfairly, and the topmen began to plot mutiny. As historian Niklas Frykman, has written, "the Hermione "had not been a happy ship. Captain Pigot sadistic, erratic and highly irritable flogged frequently without mercy. A week before the mutiny he appears to have been completely unhinged."

Pigot had also developed the practice of flogging the last sailor down from working aloft. On 20 September 1797, Pigot ordered the topsails to be reefed after a squall struck the ship. Dissatisfied with the speed of the operation because "these would be the yard-arm men, the most skilful topmen" he gave the order that the last men off the yard would be flogged. Three young sailors, in their haste to get down and avoid the punishment, fell to their deaths on the deck, one of whom hit and injured the master Southcott. Pigot ordered their bodies thrown into the sea with the words "throw the lubbers overboard". "Lubbers" meant "awkward fools" and was a serious insult in the seaman's vocabulary. He then instructed two boatswain's mates to flog the rest of the topmen when they complained. This sentence was carried out the next morning.

The humiliation of Casey, the deaths of the topmen and the severe punishments of other sailors afterward triggered the mutiny. The evening of 21 September 1797, a number of the crew, drunk on stolen rum, rushed Pigot's cabin and forced their way in after overpowering the marine stationed outside. They hacked at Pigot with knives and cutlasses before throwing him overboard, probably while he was still alive. The mutineers, probably led by a core group of just 18, went on to murder another eight of Hermione's officers: First Lieutenant Samuel Reed, Second Lieutenant Archibald Douglas, Third Lieutenant Henry Foreshaw, the Marine commander, Lieutenant McIntosh; Bosun William Martin, Purser Pacey and Surgeon Sansum. The captain's clerk and two midshipmen were also killed and all the bodies were thrown overboard. Three warrant officers survived, the gunner and carpenter were spared because they were considered useful to the ship, and Southcott the master was spared so he could navigate. Southcott lived to be a key witness, along with Casey, who was also spared, and their eyewitness accounts and testimony were key to the trials of many of the mutineers. Three petty officers joined the mutiny, one midshipman, Surgeon's Mate Cronin, and Master's Mate Turner.

Fearing retribution for their actions, the mutineers decided to navigate the ship toward Spanish waters. One reason the master's life was spared was because Turner could not navigate the ship properly without his help. The Hermione sailed to La Guaira, where they handed the ship over to the Spanish authorities. The mutineers claimed they had set the officers adrift in a small boat, as had happened in the mutiny on the Bounty some eight years earlier. The Spanish gave the mutineers just $25 each in return, and presented them with the options of joining the Spanish army, heavy labour, or refitting their ship. The Hermione was taken into service with the Spanish and renamed Santa Cecilia. The ship was manned by 25 of her former sailors under Spanish guard.

=== Recovery and renaming ===
Meanwhile, news of the fate of Hermione reached Sir Hyde Parker when HMS Diligence captured a Spanish schooner. Parker wrote to the governor of La Guaira, demanding the return of the ship and the surrender of the mutineers. He also despatched HMS Magicienne under Captain Henry Ricketts to commence negotiations. He also set up a system of informers and posted rewards, which eventually led to the capture of 33 of the mutineers, some of whom were tried aboard HMS York. Of these, 24 were hanged and gibbetted, one was transported, and eight were acquitted or pardoned. To Parker's fury, Admiral Richard Rodney Bligh (only distantly related to William Bligh of HMS Bounty) had issued pardons to several former members of Hermione's crew, including Pigot's elderly servant and his twelve-year old son, on the grounds that they could not reasonably have been expected to resist armed mutineers. Parker forced Bligh to resign and return to Britain. The Hermione had meanwhile sat in Puerto Cabello until Captain Edward Hamilton, aboard HMS Surprise cut her out of the harbour on 25 October 1799. The Spanish lost 119 dead and 231 were taken prisoner, while another 15 jumped or fell overboard. Hamilton had 11 injured, four seriously, but none killed.

Parker had the recaptured Hermione renamed HMS Retaliation, after which the Admiralty ordered her to be renamed HMS Retribution on 31 January 1800.
