= Battle of Jean-Rabel =

Naval Battle off the coast of Haiti in 1797

- Part of the Haitian Revolution and the War of the First Coalition
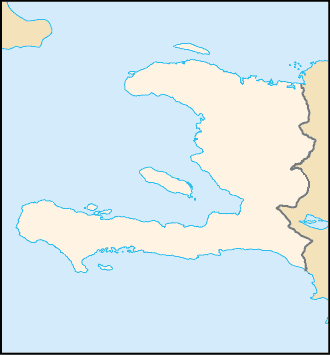
- Map of Saint-Domingue with the location of the action marked.
Date	15–21 April 1797
Location	Jean-Rabel, Saint-Domingue (Haiti) 19°55′06″N 73°12′00″W
Result	British victory

Belligerents
Great Britain	France

Commanders and leaders
William Ogilvy; Hugh Pigot	Commander Simon Billiette (a.k.a. Billiet)

Strength
ships of the line HMS Thunderer and HMS Valiant. Subsequently a squadron of three frigates and two smaller vessels.	frigate Harmonie

Casualties and losses
None	Harmonie destroyed 9 merchant ships captured

The Battle of Jean-Rabel consisted of two connected minor naval engagements of the French Revolutionary Wars and the Haitian Revolution. The first engagement saw an overwhelming British Royal Navy force consisting of two ships of the line attack and destroy a French Navy frigate in Moustique Inlet near the town of Jean-Rabel on the Northern coast of the French colony of Saint-Domingue (which later gained independence as Haiti). The second engagement took place four days later when a force of boats launched from a British frigate squadron attacked the town of Jean-Rabel itself, capturing a large number of merchant ships in the harbour that had been seized by French privateers.

The engagements came during a campaign for supremacy in the Caribbean Sea as warships and privateers launched from French colonies sought to disrupt the lucrative trade between Britain and the British colonies in the West Indies. In the spring of 1797, most British forces in the region were deployed in the Leeward Islands against the colonies of Spain, which had recently entered the war on the French side. As a result, the waters of the Northern Caribbean were lightly defended, resulting in an increase in the activity of French privateers.

The destruction of Harmonie and the elimination of the privateer base at Jean-Rabel contributed towards a reduction in privateer activity in the region and cemented British control of the Northern Caribbean sea lanes, although British forces were unable to make an impact on French control of Saint-Domingue itself, and withdrew from the island later in the year.

== Background ==
During the French Revolutionary Wars British and French rivalry in the Caribbean Sea, where both nations maintained extensive and lucrative colonies, was an important theatre of conflict. Although by 1797, Britain maintained a measure of regional maritime supremacy, the French colonies were strongly held and provided numerous and well defended harbours from which warships and privateers could launch attacks against British trade convoys. British attacks against the French colonies had resulted in few successes: one such was the occupation of the port of Môle-Saint-Nicolas on the North-Western tip of the French colony of Saint-Domingue in 1793. From here Royal Navy warships could control the Windward Passage, a vital artery for the Jamaican trade.

The rest of the Northern coast of Saint-Domingue was still in French hands however, and in the autumn of 1796 the balance of power in the Caribbean shifted with the declaration of the Treaty of San Ildefonso, in which Spain, which also maintained substantial Caribbean colonies, declared war on Britain. In response, British forces in the Caribbean were split, with the majority attached to a fleet under Rear-Admiral Henry Harvey, which captured Trinidad in February 1797 before unsuccessfully attacking Puerto Rico. With British forces distracted, the French privateer fleets were able to launch a series of attacks against commerce in the Northern Caribbean, capturing numerous American vessels trading with British colonies.

The privateers took many of these captured ships to small harbours along the northern coast of Saint-Domingue. There the privateers thought they and their prizes would be safe from the British squadron under Rear-Admiral Sir Hyde Parker, which based at Môle-Saint-Nicolas. In early April 1797, the French civilian governors at the capital of Cap-Français on the Northeastern coast insisted that these vessels come to the capital; the governors ordered the French frigate Harmonie, based in the port, to sail to Port-de-Paix and back, collecting all prize vessels that lay in harbour there and at the nearby town of Jean-Rabel.

== Destruction of Harmonie ==
The officers of Harmonie objected to their orders, considering that the journey was too dangerous given the proximity of Parker's squadron. However they were overruled and she sailed in mid-April 1797. Shortly after Harmonie departed Cap-Français, a cruising British frigate, the 32-gun HMS Janus under Captain James Bissett, spotted her. Although Janus was significantly smaller than Harmonie, the French ship did not offer battle but instead turned for the port of Marégot. Bissett meanwhile sailed westwards until he encountered Parker's squadron off Môle-Saint-Nicolas on 15 April. Parker had three ships of the line at his disposal, his own flagship HMS Queen, HMS Thunderer under Captain William Ogilvy and HMS Valiant under Captain Edward Crawley, and he despatched the latter ships to Marégot in search of Harmonie, while his flagship put into port for fresh provisions.

On the afternoon of 15 April, Thunderer discovered Harmonie sailing through the Tortuga Channel between the northern coast of Saint-Domingue and the small island of Tortuga. Giving chase, the large warship pursued the frigate to Mostique Inlet near Jean-Rabel, where Harmonie anchored in shallow water off the rocky shoreline. Ogilvy relayed the frigate's location to Parker and was ordered to enter the inlet with Thunderer and Valiant and capture or destroy the French ship. At 16:15 the British warships examined the mouth of the inlet, straying into dangerously shallow water in their efforts to close with Harmonie. The wind was strengthening however and Ogilvy eventually decided that it was too dangerous to risk wrecking his ships on the shore in the conditions. At 17:00 both British ships were able to fire several broadsides at the French frigate without response, but there was no noticeable damage and the wind remained strong and so Ogilvy retired for the night to a safe distance.

On the morning of 16 April, Thunderer and Valiant returned, both ships opening fire on Harmonie in the calmer weather. Recognising that their ship could not escape and faced impossible odds, the French officers took the only available option and deliberately drove their ship onshore at 07:00, setting the vessel on fire as they evacuated. Harmonie's ammunition stores detonated at 08:47, destroying the ship completely as Thunderer and Valiant retired. French casualties are unknown, while both British ships escaped without loss and only minor damage.

== Raid on Jean-Rabel ==
Alerted to the presence of the large number of prize ships at Jean-Rabel by Harmonie's unsuccessful cruise, Parker ordered Captain Hugh Pigot, commander of the British frigate HMS Hermione, to recapture them. Pigot was commander of a frigate squadron consisting of HMS Quebec under Captain John Cooke and HMS Mermaid under Captain Robert Otway and two smaller vessels the brig Drake and cutter Penelope. Pigot had a reputation as a successful coastal raider: on 22 March, Hermione had attacked and destroyed a number of small French vessels off Puerto Rico. Having gathered the squadron, Pigot brought his ships to Jean-Rabel at 15:00 on 20 April to repeat this earlier victory. Remaining out of sight to the northwest until night fell, the crews began preparations for a cutting out expedition, in which parties of sailors in ship's boats of the squadron would row into the fortified bay under cover of darkness and attempt to board and capture the vessels in the harbour before sailing them out to the waiting squadron.

During the evening of 20 April the sea was calm with a strong easterly current, which enabled Pigot's squadron to close within 2 nautical miles (3.7 km) of the port of Jean-Rabel unobserved. The squadron's boats, commanded by the ships' junior officers, then approached the shore silently. To distract any watchers on the shore, Pigot brought his ships across the entrance to the inlet, attracting the defenders' attention away from the harbour. This enabled the boats to come alongside the shipping in the port undetected, each vessel keeping to the shallows close inshore until they reached their targets. At 01:00 on 21 April the attack commenced with a heavy volley of musketry from the boats as British sailors swarmed onto the captured merchant vessels. Fighting was brief, although the gunfire had alerted the cannon batteries overlooking the port. Unable to determine friend from foe in the harbour, the guns instead fired on the frigates in the bay, Pigot ordering his ships to return fire.

By 04:00, the ship Polly; brigs Two Sisters, Abiona and Sally; schooners Columbia, Juno and Citizen Snow Hill and sloops Industry and a second unnamed were in British hands, their captors sailing the nine prizes out of the port and towards Pigot's waiting ships. All that remained of the prizes in Jean-Rabel harbour were two rowing boats, which had been dragged up the beach before the attack began. All these vessels were American-flagged ships, although their papers of ownership had in most cases been sent to Cap-Français. French casualties in the operation were not reported, although the British assault force did not lose a single man.

== Aftermath ==
These operations firmly established British control of the waters around Saint-Domingue, eliminating a significant opponent in the French Harmonie and destroying a port used frequently by privateers to store their prizes. It was not enough however to solidify the British presence in Saint-Domingue and by 1798 British forces withdrew entirely from the colony. Pigot, Ogilvy and Parker all sent despatches to the Admiralty recounting the action, although historian William James notes that Pigot neglected to give credit by name to the junior officers who participated in the operation. Pigot was a notoriously unpopular officer – six months later he would be beaten, stabbed and thrown overboard by his own crew in the infamous HMS Hermione mutiny.
