= Sir Edward Hamilton, 1st Baronet =

Royal Navy Admiral (1772–1851)

Admiral Sir Edward Hamilton Bt KCB
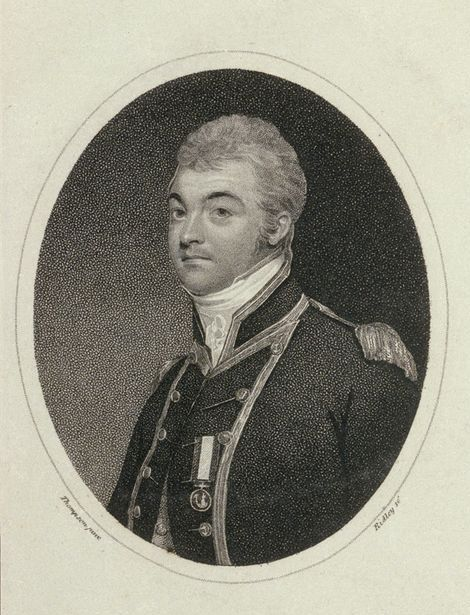
- Portrait of Hamilton
- Born: 22 March 1772
- Died: March 21, 1851 (aged 78); London, England
- Relatives: Sir John Hamilton (father); Sir Charles Hamilton (brother)
- Military career
- Allegiance: Great Britain; United Kingdom
- Branch: Royal Navy
- Service years: 1777–1851
- Rank: Admiral
- Commands: HMS Comet; HMS Surprise
- Conflicts: French Revolutionary Wars; Battle of the Hyères Islands; Cutting-out of HMS Hermione
- Awards: KCB

Admiral Sir Edward Joseph Hamilton, 1st Baronet, KCB (22 March 1772 – 21 March 1851) was a Royal Navy officer who served in French Revolutionary and Napoleonic Wars, eventually rising to the rank of admiral.

== Family and early life ==
Hamilton was born on 22 March 1772, the second and younger son of Captain John Hamilton, who was subsequently created a baronet in 1776. Edward Hamilton's mother was Cassandra Agnes, sister of Admiral Charles Chamberlayne. Edward first appeared on the muster books of his father's ship, the 74-gun HMS Hector, in 1777 when he was five years old. He did not actually join the ship until the age of seven, when he came aboard on 21 May 1779 at the rank of midshipman. He sailed with the Hector to the Jamaica station, where he was subsequently lent to HMS Ramillies. He returned to England after the end of the war and attended the Royal Grammar School, Guildford. He subsequently returned to active service in 1787, spending the next three years aboard the 74-gun HMS Standard. He took and passed his lieutenant's examination in 1790, after which he moved aboard the 36-gun frigate HMS Melampus, under Captain Charles Pole.

== Early French Revolutionary Wars ==
Hamilton then joined the 100-gun HMS Victory, which at that time was the flagship of Vice-Admiral Sir Samuel Hood. He then entered another period of retirement from active service, during which time he studied at the University of Caen, and travelled through both France and Portugal. After the French First Republic declared war on Britain in February 1793, Hamilton again returned to active service, being assigned to Lord Howe's flagship, the 100-gun first rate HMS Queen Charlotte. By July he had moved to his brother, Sir Charles Hamilton's ship, the 28-gun HMS Dido, and was commissioned as a lieutenant on 29 October 1793. While serving on the Dido he helped in the capture of a privateer and her crew. He took a boat, crewed by only eight sailors, and captured the grounded privateer, put out the fire that had been set by her crew to destroy her, and then went ashore to capture her escaped crew. He was later present at the siege of Bastia, and was given command of 100 British and 300 Corsican soldiers at Girolate. Here he constructed a number of batteries within pistol shot of French forces, from which he was able to subject them to continuous bombardment. The French surrendered after 13 days under fire.

He returned to the Victory on 10 July 1794, being appointed her ninth lieutenant. Admiral Hood showed him special favour, though, when he exercised his right to promote whom he wished, and on 7 October he appointed Hamilton as Victory's first lieutenant. It was not long before Hood was ordered to return to Britain though, and after his arrival he struck his flag to spend the winter ashore. With Hood gone, Victory returned to being a private ship, and Hamilton returned to being a junior lieutenant. Hamilton and the Victory were back at sea in 1795, returning to the Mediterranean. He was present at the Naval Battle of Hyères Islands on 13 July 1795, shortly after which Admiral Jervis arrived to take command of the fleet. Jervis promoted Hamilton to commander on 11 February 1796, and appointed him to the fireship HMS Comet with orders to sail to the West Indies. Hamilton did so, returning to Lisbon with dispatches.

== Promotion to command ==
He was again promoted, this time to post-captain on 3 June 1797, and was initially appointed to serve aboard the 114-gun first-rate HMS San Josef, which had been captured at the Battle of Cape St Vincent. He was then transferred to the 24-gun HMS Surprise, aboard which he sailed to Newfoundland, and then on to Jamaica, where he remained between October 1798 and January 1800, serving with the squadrons under Sir Hyde Parker. He was a particularly effective frigate captain, capturing or destroying over 80 armed vessels, privateers and merchants, bringing in an estimated £200,000 in prize money. It was while serving with Parker that Hamilton carried out the most famous act of his career, the cutting-out of the former HMS Hermione from the Spanish port of Puerto Cabello.

=== Recovering the Hermione ===
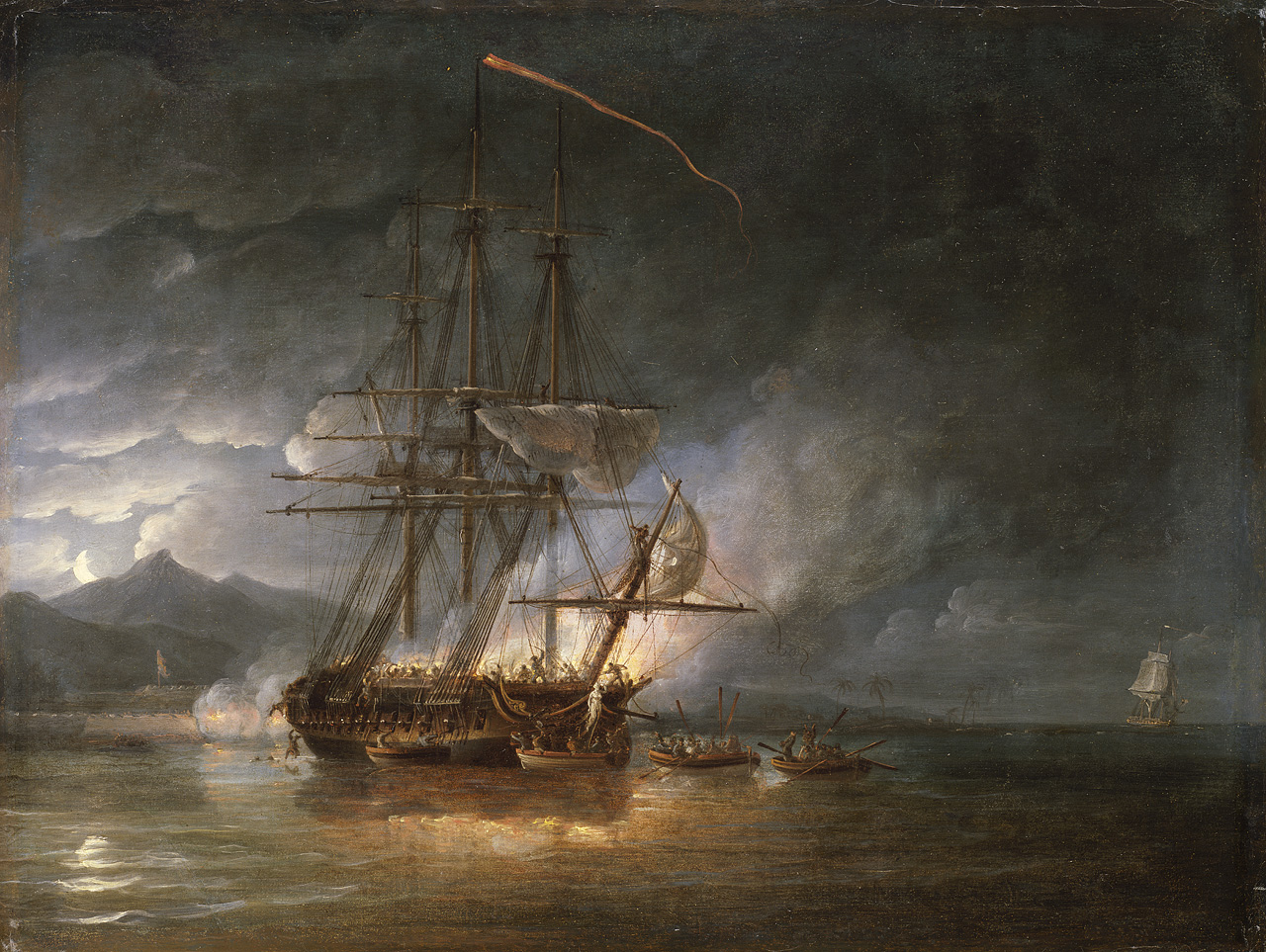
Santa Cecilia, the former Hermione, is cut out at Puerto Cabello by boats from HMS Surprise

The Hermione was a former frigate of the Royal Navy, commanded by Captain Hugh Pigot. In September 1797 a number of the crew had risen up against the apparently tyrannical Pigot and murdered him and nine other officers, throwing their bodies overboard. Fearing retribution for their actions, the mutineers had sailed the Hermione to the Spanish port of La Guaira, and handed her over to the authorities. When news of the mutiny reached Parker, he demanded the return of the ship and the surrender of the mutineers, instigating a process that would eventually see the apprehending of 33 of them. The Hermione meanwhile had been renamed Santa Cecilia, but remained in port. News eventually reached Parker that the Santa Cecilia had been sighted in Puerto Cabello, and ordered the Surprise to intercept her, should she attempt to put to sea. Hamilton decided that the honour of the Royal Navy depended on the recovery of the ship, and was determined to retake her. Anchoring near the port he devised a plan to cut her out of the harbour and asked for a boat and an extra 20 men from Parker. Parker declared the scheme too risky, and refused to send the men, but Hamilton went ahead anyway.

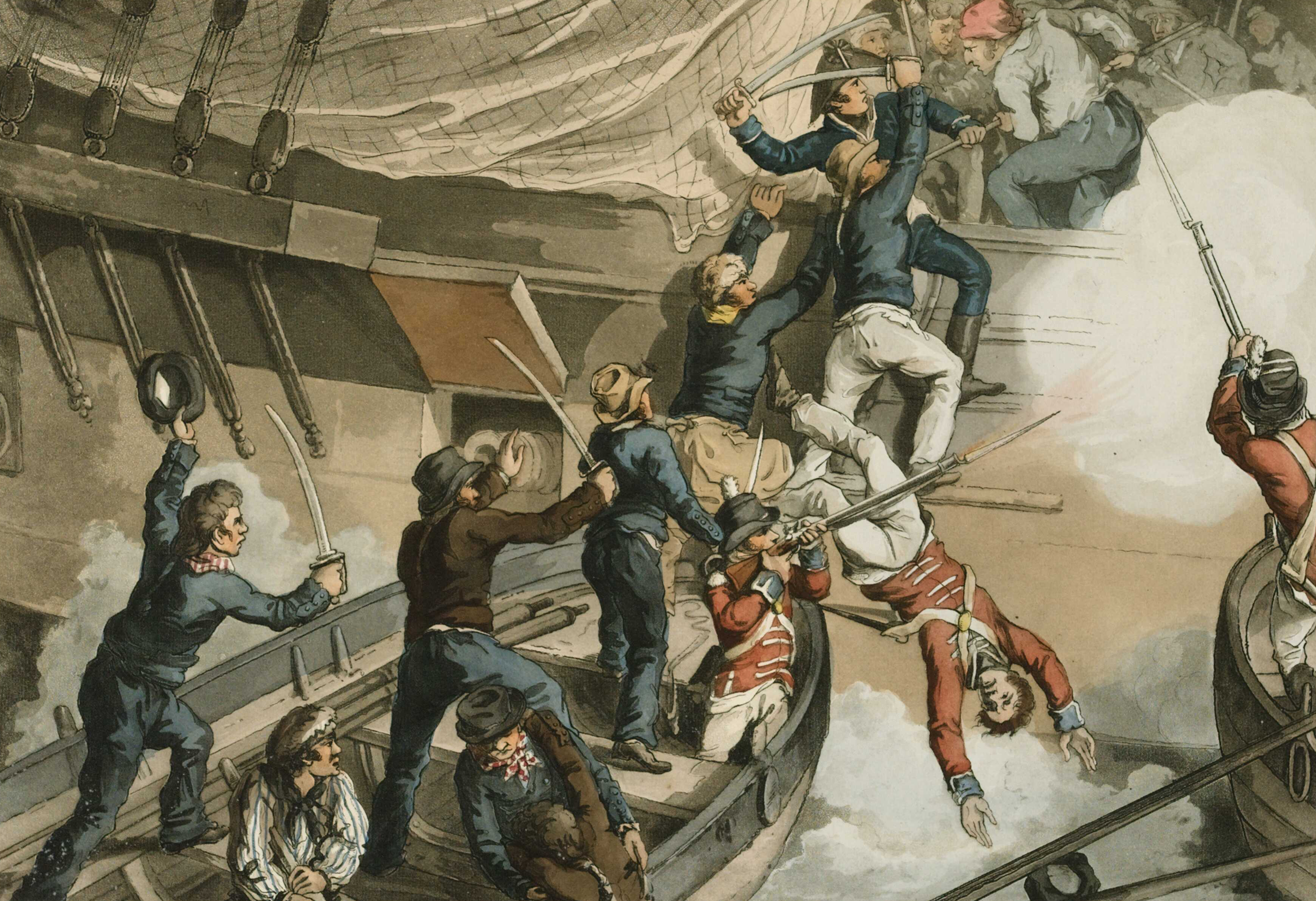
The men from Surprise rush aboard the Santa Cecilia in Puerto Cabello.

He and a force of some 100 soldiers and sailors in ships' boats approached the Santa Cecilia, which was heavily manned with around 400 Spanish, and lay under the guns of two shore batteries, together mounting some 200 guns. In the ensuing struggle Hamilton and his men fought their way aboard the ship, overpowered the Spanish defenders after a hard-fought battle, and sailed the Hermione out of the port. The Spanish had lost 119 killed, while 231 were taken prisoner, 97 of whom were wounded. All but three were subsequently returned to the port the next day. Another 15 Spanish escaped by jumping overboard and swimming ashore, while 20 more escaped in a launch that had been guarding the ship. By contrast the British had not lost a single man, and had just 11 wounded, four of them seriously. One of them was Hamilton himself, who had suffered a blow to the head from a musket, and cuts from sabre, pike and grapeshot. Parker had the recaptured Hermione renamed HMS Retaliation, after which the Admiralty ordered her to be renamed HMS Retribution on 31 January 1800.

== Rewards ==
Hamilton was widely lauded for his daring feat. The House of Assembly in Jamaica awarded him a £300 sword. King George III created him a Knight Bachelor on 1 February 1800. Hamilton also received a Naval Gold Medal for the action. He was also voted a freeman of the City of London on 6 March 1800, which was to be awarded him in a gold box with a value of 50 guineas. The wounded Hamilton was sent home to recover aboard the Jamaica packet, but on her voyage she was captured by the French and Hamilton was taken prisoner. He was sent to Paris, where he seems to have come to the attention of Napoleon Bonaparte. Hamilton spent six months in prison, before being released and repatriated, having been exchanged for four French midshipmen. He finally made it to London, in time to be present at a special banquet held by the Court of Common Council of the City of London to celebrate the anniversary of his cutting out of the Hermione. Here he received his gold box and the freedom of the city. He was also offered a pension of £300 a year for his wounds, which he turned down. He was both rich enough from his prize money not to need the pension, and also feared that taking it might be used as an excuse not to give him active employment again.

== Decline ==
Perhaps due to the injury to his head he had sustained in the action on the Hermione, or because of a degree of insanity aggravated by the hero worship he received, Hamilton soon revealed a ruthless streak. In October 1800, he was appointed to HMS Trent and on 22 January 1802 brought to court-martial on a charge of having strung his gunner and the gunner's mates in the rigging for a trivial offence, a punishment that was both excessive and illegal. The court-martial was held on board HMS Gladiator with Vice-admiral Sir Andrew Mitchell, Rear-admiral John Holloway and Rear-admiral Cuthbert Collingwood among those presiding The court heard how, before going ashore, Hamilton had left orders with the gunner, William Bowman, for the guns and carronades on the quarterdeck to be cleaned. On returning, Hamilton, being dissatisfied with what he saw, "dammed the gunner for an old rascal" and instantly ordered him and his whole crew seized up in the shrouds. The first Lieutenant stated that the guns appeared remarkably clean save for the footprints of the topmen who had stood on them to ascend the shrouds some time after. This was explained to Hamilton and verified by the other officers and quartermasters. The weather was cold and frosty and after an hour-and-a-half, the elderly gunner appealed to the ship’s surgeon, who was on the quarterdeck, and after the surgeon had spoken to the captain, Bowman was cut down.

The offence against Hamilton was proved and he was dismissed from the navy. He was restored in June 1802 but never again received employment in an operational role.

George Vernon Jackson joined Trent in 1801 as a midshipman and found his new captain to be a man who ran his ship in much the same way as Pigot. Trent's log book reveals that Hamilton was every bit as fond of the lash, which Jackson described as being "incessantly at work". Later, having risen to the rank of admiral, he recalled his time aboard;

I should be loth to say what my opinion of Sir Edward Hamilton might have become had I stopped much longer in Trent. As each new day passed, so did I conceive new terrors of this man. A more uncompromising disciplinarian did not exist, or one less scrupulous in exacting the due fulfilment of his orders, whatever they were The Trent, I must admit, was in excellent order; indeed as regards discipline and the general efficiency of her company, she was equal, if not superior, to any other frigate afloat; but those qualities had all been prompted at no small sacrifice to humanity. No sailor was allowed to walk from one place to another on deck, and woe betide an unfortunate fellow who halted in his run aloft.

Admitted as fellow-commoner to Emmanuel College, Cambridge in March 1802, Hamilton did not take a degree at Cambridge. He married on 1 November 1804, and in June 1806 was appointed to the royal yacht Mary. He moved to command the Prince Regent, where he remained until his resignation on 7 January 1819. He was nominated a KCB on 2 January 1815, and was created a baronet on 26 January 1819. He also served for a time as Deputy Lieutenant of Brecknockshire. Through his seniority he continued to receive promotions. He became a rear-admiral on 19 July 1821, a vice-admiral on 10 January 1837 and finally an admiral on 9 November 1846. He died at 17 Cumberland Terrace, Regent's Park on 21 March 1851 at the age of 79, his wife having predeceased him on 27 March 1840. His son, Edward Hamilton, inherited the baronetcy.

== See also ==
- O'Byrne, William Richard (1849). "Hamilton, Edward" . A Naval Biographical Dictionary . John Murray – via Wikisource.

== Notes ==
Honorary titles
Preceded by William Stretton	High Sheriff of Brecknockshire; 1835	Succeeded by John Lloyd Vaughan Watkins
Baronetage of the United Kingdom
New creation	Baronet (of Trebinshun House); 1819–1851	Succeeded by Edward Hamilton
