= John Boteler Parker =

British Army general (1786–1851)

Major-General John Boteler Parker CB
- Born: 29 May 1786
- Died: 25 March 1851 (aged 64); Woolwich Common
- Burial place: Charlton, London
- Military career
- Allegiance: United Kingdom
- Branch: British Army
- Rank: Major-General
- Commands: Royal Military Academy, Woolwich
- Conflicts: Napoleonic Wars; Walcheren Campaign; Peninsular War; Hundred Days

Major-General John Boteler Parker (29 May 1786 – 25 March 1851) was a British Army general of the early 19th century. He saw action at the Battle of Waterloo, and later became Commandant of the Royal Military Academy, Woolwich.

== Career ==
Parker was the second son of Admiral Sir Hyde Parker and Anne Boteler.

Joining the army, Parker served in the Walcheren Campaign in 1809, and in operations up to and including the siege of Flushing in the same year. In February 1812, he embarked for Lisbon with the Duke of Wellington's army till the conclusion of the Peninsular War in 1814, taking part in the Battle of Vitoria, the Siege of San Sebastián, the Battle of Orthez, the action at Tarbes, and the Battle of Toulouse.

As a second captain in Captain Hew Ross' Royal Horse Artillery Troop, Parker fought at Waterloo, being (brevet) promoted to major on 18 June 1814, wounded and having his left leg amputated. For his services at the battle, he was nominated to be appointed a Companion of the Most Honourable Military Order of the Bath, upon the recommendation of Field Marshal the Duke of Wellington.

He was second captain to the Company of Gentlemen Cadets from 28 December 1821 to 18 January 1837. He lived for a time in Government House (situated at the junction of Woolwich New Road and Nightingale Place) in Woolwich, commissioning architect John Douglas Hopkins to enhance the building in 1840. He was Lieutenant-Governor (Commandant) of the Royal Military Academy from 1 April 1846, until his death, aged 66, at Woolwich Common on 25 March 1851. His remains were interred in a vault at St Luke's Church in nearby Charlton.

== Family ==
Parker married Mary Popham, daughter of Admiral Sir Home Riggs Popham, on 3 November 1814. They had at least eight children: Mary Elizabeth (born 25 August 1815), Hyde Popham (born 1818), Home John (2 June 1819 - 15 October 1881), Harry Richard (8 May 1821 - 16 August 1907), Arthur Charles (born 26 May 1822), Caroline (born 26 Apr 1824), Emily Fanny Eliza (born 26 September 1826) and Matilda Anne (died 26 February 1904).

Parker's elder brother, Hyde Parker III, like their father, became a notable English naval officer.

Military offices
Preceded by George Whitmore (British Army officer)	Commandant of the Royal Military Academy Woolwich; 1846–1851	Succeeded by Colonel G. G. Lewis
