= HMS Drake (1779) =

Brig-sloop of the Royal Navy

History

Great Britain
- Name: HMS Drake
- Builder: Henry Ladd, Dover
- Launched: May 1779
- Fate: Condemned as unfit for service in September 1800

General characteristics
- Class & type: brig-sloop
- Tons burthen: 22073/94 bm
- Length: 78 ft 10 1/2 in (24.0 m) (overall); 59 ft 8 in (18.2 m) (keel)
- Beam: 26 ft 4 1/2 in (8.0 m)
- Depth of hold: 10 ft 9 1/2 in (3.3 m)
- Propulsion: Sails
- Sail plan: Two masted square rigged with a spanker on the main mast
- Complement: 80
- Armament: 14 × 4-pounder guns (replaced by 6-pounders by 1783) + 12 × 1/2-pounder swivel guns

HMS Drake was a 14-gun brig-sloop of the Royal Navy. She was bought from a commercial builder during the early years of the American War of Independence, and went on to support operations in the English Channel and the Caribbean. At one stage she assisted an attack on a French-held island, an expedition commanded by a young Horatio Nelson. Laid up for a time after the end of the American War of Independence, she returned to service shortly before the outbreak of the French Revolutionary Wars. Drake spent most of her time in Caribbean waters, until being declared unfit for service in 1800 and deleted from the navy lists.

== Construction and commissioning ==
Drake was built by Henry Ladd, of Dover and purchased while on the stocks as a cutter in March 1779. She was registered and established as a sloop on 19 March 1779, and launched in May that year, having commissioned in March under Commander William Brown. After being launched she was sailed to Deptford where she was fitted and coppered between 22 May and 19 July 1779 for the sum of £1,797 17s 6d.

== American War of Independence ==
Drake was initially assigned to Admiral Sir Charles Hardy's fleet during the invasion crisis in 1779, and after the crisis had passed, went out to the Leeward Islands in February 1780. Commander Richard Curgenven succeeded Brown in April 1781, and in December that year command passed to Commander Charles Dixon.

Dixon took Drake back to England, where she was refitted between April and June 1782 for the sum of £1,595 5s 4d. She then returned to the West Indies.

In early March 1783, Captain James King of the frigate Resistance fell in with the frigates Albemarle (under the command of Captain Horatio Nelson) and Tartar, and the brigs Drake and Barrington (or Admiral Barrington). From here on accounts diverge.

Schomberg's account: King decided, on the basis of the information he had gathered from a French frigate that he had captured on 2 March, to capture Turk's Island. The British landed some 350 seamen and marines under the command of Dixon, while the two brigs positioned themselves to cover the landing and fire on the town if necessary. However, two shore batteries (one of four 24-pounder guns and one of five 6-pounder guns) that the British had not expected opened fire on the brigs. Their fire wounded seven men on Drake and two on Barrington. and forced the two brigs to withdraw. At the same time Dixon ran into a well-entrenched French force that outnumbered his landing party. He was able to extricate his force without casualties. King contemplated a second attack with the frigates, but the winds were not favorable and ultimately the British squadron withdrew.

Nelson's account: Nelson in his letter of 9 March 1783, reports that he was in command of the squadron and the operation. The squadron also included Coquette, a French frigate prize to Resistance, that remained out of the action. Shortly after the squadron arrived at Turk's Island, Tartar left without explanation.

Nelson states that he sent Dixon under a flag of truce to ask the French commander to surrender; he refused. The British then landed 167 troops, under Dixon. Unexpectedly, a shore battery of three guns opened fire on the brigs. Drake's master was wounded, as were some seven men aboard the General Barrington. Dixon reported that seamen were manning the French guns and that the French troops had several field pieces. Nelson then decided to withdraw.

== Interwar years and French Revolutionary Wars ==
With the conclusion of the American War of Independence Drake was paid off in July 1783 to ordinary at Sheerness. She underwent repairs and a refit at Sheerness for £2,981 between October 1787 and December 1788, recommissioning in November 1788 under Commander Jeremiah Beale. Drake was initially assigned to operate in the English Channel, at first under Beale, then from November 1789 under Commander George Countess, and from January 1791 under Commander John Dowling. She passed under Commander Samuel Brooking in December 1793, and went out to Jamaica in May 1795. Commander Thomas Gott succeeded Brooking in October 1796, and in turn Commander John Perkins succeeded Gott in 1797. (Note: Gott went on to command Cormorant, but was killed when she caught fire and exploded on 24 December 1796.)

On 20 April 1797 Drake formed part of a squadron under Captain Hugh Pigot, consisting of the 32-gun frigates Hermione, Mermaid and Quebec, and the cutter Penelope. The squadron cut out nine ships at Jean-Rabel without suffering any casualties.

On 17 September, Pelican engaged the French schooner Trompeuse, of twelve 6-pounder guns and 78 crew. During the engagement Trompeuse blew up, though boats from Pelican were able to rescue 60 of the crew. During the chase and engagement, Drake was inshore of Pelican and sailed to cut Trompeuse off from taking refuge in Jean-Rabel. Pelican lost one man killed and had five men wounded but Drake apparently was not exposed to hostile fire and so did not suffer any casualties.

On 25 October 1798 Drake captured the French privateer Favorite. (Note: The head money for the captain was £53 13s and 9d; a fifth-class share, that of a seaman, was worth 14s 3 3/4d.)

On 3 November, 1799 she recaptured an American brig that had been captured 5 days earlier by a French privateer. In Drake Perkins, in company with Solebay, Captain Poyntz, shared in the capture of four French corvettes on 24 November 1799 off Cape Tiburon. All four were sailing from Cape François to Jacquemel. Solebay captured Egyptienne, which was of 300 tons burthen, was armed with 18 guns, and had a crew of 140 men.

One of the vessels was the 16 or 18-gun Eole, which the British took into service as Nimrod. (Note: Eole's name is variously also given as Ealan, or Eolan.) A third vessel was the 12-gun Sarier. The fourth was the 8-gun Vengeur, the former Royal Navy schooner Charlotte. (Note: James gives her name as Levrier rather than Vengeur.)

== Fate ==
Drake continued in the navy until being deleted from the lists by Admiralty order on 3 July 1800. She was subsequently condemned at Jamaica as unfit for service.
