= French frigate Harmonie =

French naval ship

History

France
- Name: Harmonie
- Builder: Bordeaux
- Laid down: May 1794
- Launched: December 1795
- Completed: May 1796
- Fate: Beached and burnt 16 April 1797

General characteristics
- Class & type: Virginie-class frigate
- Displacement: 1,390 tonneaux
- Tons burthen: 720 port tonneaux
- Length: 47.4 m (156 ft)
- Beam: 11.9 m (39 ft)
- Draught: 5.5 m (18 ft)
- Armament: 44 guns

Harmonie was a 40-gun Virginie-class frigate of the French Navy. Her crew scuttled her on 17 March 1797 to avoid having the Royal Navy capture her. She on being burned was reported as pierced for 44 guns

== Career ==
On 7 June 1796, Harmonie departed Rochefort to ferry weapons and ammunition to Cap-Français, under Captain Joshua Barney. (Note: Barney was an American naval officer in both the American Revolutionary War and the War of 1812. Between 1796 and 1802 he served in the French Navy.) She then cruised in the Caribbean between Havana and Chesapeake Bay, returning to Cap-Français on 17 October. Lieutenant Simon Billiette took command of Harmonie on 19 August 1796; he was promoted to Commander on 22 September. (Note: Billiette was also called "Billiet" (Quintin & Quintin 2003, p. 69))

In April 1797, Harmonie was ordered to escort a convoy of merchantmen waiting in Jean-Rabel. She departed Cap Français but on 15 April the ships of the line HMS Thunderer and HMS Valiant intercepted her. In the ensuing Battle of Jean-Rabel, Harmonie sought refugee in the shallow waters off le Marigot, and the ships of the line departed after firing on her with little effect for several hours or otherwise reported were struggling to keep station because of the wind. On 16 April, however, the ships returned, and the crew of Harmonie, seeing her hopelessly cornered, scuttled her by burning. Billiette sustained two wounds at the left leg.

On 20 April, the British ships captured most of the convoy that Harmonie had been tasked to escort. Billiette was court-martialled for the destruction of his frigate, and on 26 April 1798 found innocent of the loss of the ship.
