= HMS Hermione (1782) =

Hermione-class frigate of the Royal Navy

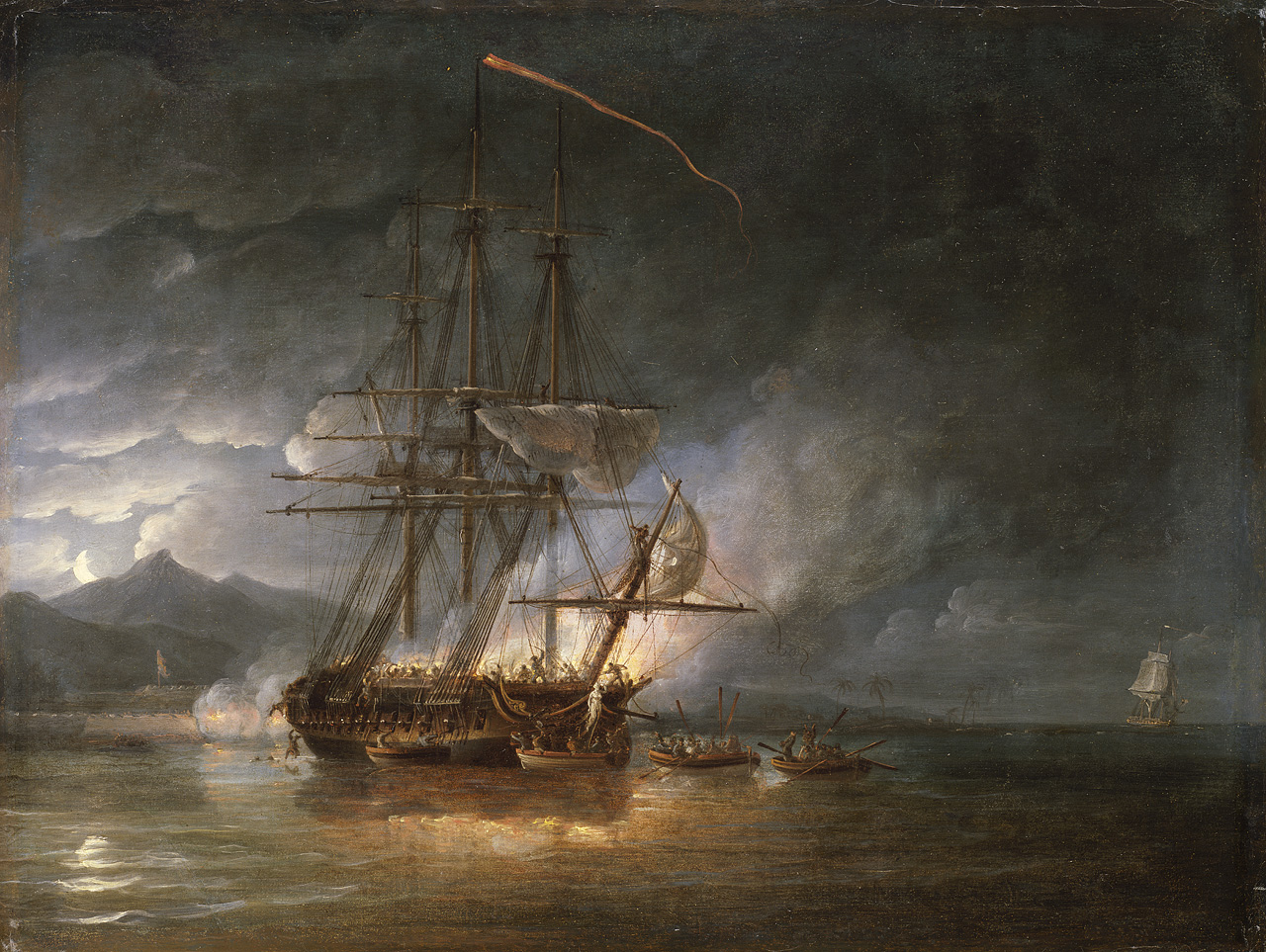
- Santa Cecilia being recaptured on 25 October 1799

History

Great Britain
- Name: HMS Hermione
- Ordered: 20 March 1780
- Builder: Sydenham Teast, Bristol
- Laid down: June 1780
- Launched: 9 September 1782
- Commissioned: January 1783 (at builder); Between 7 April and 28 June 1783 at Sheerness
- Out of service: Taken by mutineers on 21/22 September 1797; Handed over to the Spanish on 27 September

Spain
- Name: Santa Cecilia
- Acquired: 27 September 1797
- Captured: By the Royal Navy on 25 October 1799

Great Britain
- Name: HMS Retaliation
- Acquired: Recaptured on 25 October 1799
- Commissioned: September 1800
- In service: 1782-1805
- Renamed: HMS Retribution on 31 January 1800
- Fate: Broken up in June 1805

General characteristics
- Class & type: 32-gun Hermione-class fifth rate
- Tons burthen: 714 70/94(bm)
- Length: 129 ft 0 in (39.3 m) (gun deck); 106 ft 10 1/2 in (32.6 m) (keel)
- Beam: 35 ft 5 1/2 in (10.8 m)
- Draught: 9 ft 2 in (2.8 m); 15 ft 3 in (4.6 m) (loaded)
- Depth of hold: 12 ft 8 in (3.9 m)
- Propulsion: Sails
- Sail plan: Full-rigged ship
- Complement: 220
- Armament: Upper deck: 26 × 12-pounder guns; QD: 4 × 6-pounder guns + 4 × 18-pounder carronades; Fc: 2 × 6-pounder guns + 2 × 18-pounder carronades

HMS Hermione was the lead ship of the Hermione class, a six-ship class of 32-gun fifth-rate frigates of the Royal Navy. She was launched on 9 September 1782, at Bristol. Hermione was commissioned and then paid off a number of times during the 1780s. She underwent repairs between October 1790 and June 1792, followed by a period spent refitting at Chatham Dockyard until January 1793. She was recommissioned in December 1792, before sailing to the Jamaica in March 1793. Hermione served in the West Indies during the early years of the French Revolutionary Wars, participating in the British attack on Port-au-Prince, where she led a small squadron that accompanied troop transports.

In February 1797 — the year of the Spithead and Nore mutinies — Captain Hugh Pigot took command of Hermione. She saw action in 1797, under Pigot including leading a squadron that cut out nine ships at the Battle of Jean-Rabel without suffering any casualties. Pigot was a cruel officer who meted out severe and arbitrary punishments to his crew. This treatment of the crew led to the bloodiest mutiny in British naval history in September 1797, which saw Pigot and most of the ship's officers murdered. The mutineers then handed the ship over to the Spanish on 27 September 1797, who renamed her Santa Cecilia. On 25 October 1799, boats from HMS Surprise under Captain Edward Hamilton, cut her out of Puerto Cabello harbour. She was returned to Royal Navy service under the name Retaliation and the British Admiralty later renamed her Retribution on 31 January 1800. She returned to Portsmouth in 1802, and in October 1803, she was fitted for service for Trinity House. She was broken up at Deptford in June 1805.

== Early years ==
HMS Hermione was the lead ship of a six-ship class of frigates designed by Edward Hunt and termed the Hermione class. (Note: The initial design was modified after the first two ships to raise the waist, and all were officially referred to as the Andromeda class.) She was 129 ft 0 in (39.3 m) long with a 106 ft 10 1/2 in (32.6 m) keel, a beam of 35 ft 5 1/2 in (10.8 m), a draught of 9 ft 2 in (2.8 m), and a hold depth of 12 ft 8 in (3.9 m). She was 714 70/94 (bm) tons burthen. She was ordered 20 March 1780, and the keel was laid down in June 1780. She was launched on 9 September 1782 from Teast's of Bristol, having cost £11,350.14s.4d to build, with a further £4,570.2s.2d spent on dockyard expenses, and £723.16s.9d on fitting out.

Hermione was commissioned initially under Captain Thomas Lloyd, who commanded her until she was paid off in April 1783. She recommissioned that same month under Captain John Stone, who sailed her to Nova Scotia on 17 October, after which she was paid off in 1785. Hermione may have then been recommissioned under Captain William H. Ricketts during the Spanish Armament of 1790, though this is uncertain. She did, however, undergo a repair between October 1790 and June 1792, followed by a period spent refitting at Chatham Dockyard until January 1793. She was recommissioned in December 1792, under Captain John Hills, under whom she sailed to Jamaica on 10 March 1793.

Hermione served in the West Indies during the early years of the French Revolutionary Wars. On 2 June 1794, under Hills, the ship participated in the British attack on Port-au-Prince, where she led a small squadron that accompanied troop transports. Hermione had five men killed and six wounded in the attack.

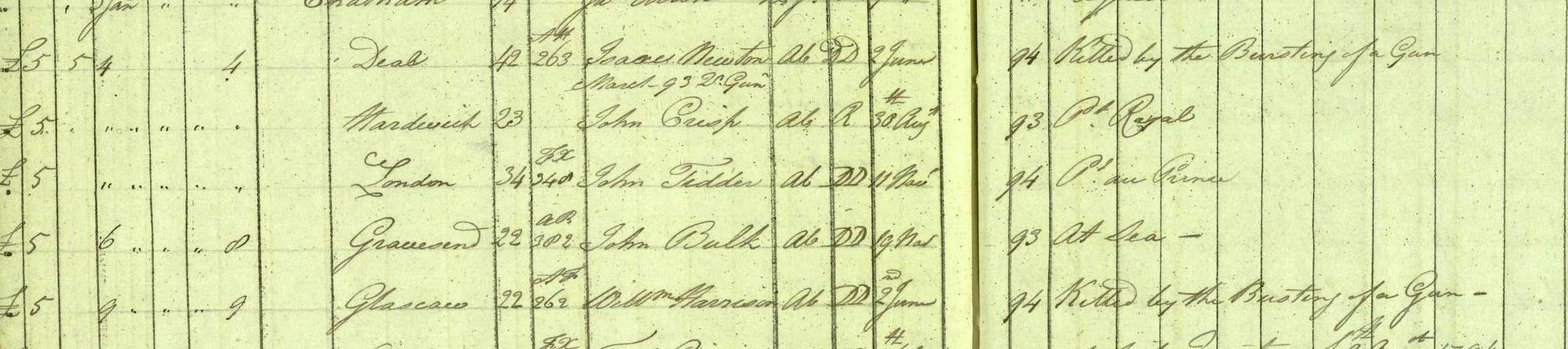
HMS Hermione muster 1797, listing 145 & 149 two seamen killed by a bursting cannon on 2 June 1794

The British captured the port and its defences, and in doing so captured a large number of merchant vessels. Hermione was also among the vessels that shared in the capture on 17 July, of the Lady Walterstasse."Many of the Hermione crew came down with yellow fever or malaria during the course of 1794. Of these, some 40 died." In late August, Hills himself fell ill, first with dysentery and then yellow fever. He died at Port Royal on 4 September 1794. Captain Philip Wilkinson replaced Hills and was himself replaced in February 1797 — the year of the Spithead and Nore mutinies — by Captain Hugh Pigot. Pigot was a cruel officer who meted out severe and arbitrary punishments to his crew. During a nine-month period, as captain of his previous command HMS Success he ordered at least 85 floggings, the equivalent of half the crew; two men died from their injuries.

Hermione was sent to patrol the Mona Passage between the Dominican Republic and Puerto Rico. Under Pigot, she destroyed three privateers at Puerto Rico on 22 March 1797. On 20 April, Hermione was the lead ship in a squadron formed of the 32-gun frigates HMS Mermaid and HMS Quebec, the 14-gun brig HMS Drake, and the cutter HMS Penelope. The squadron cut out nine ships at the Battle of Jean-Rabel without suffering any casualties. On 6 September 1797, she was in company with HMS Diligence and HMS Renommee when Diligence captured a Spanish 6-gun packet ship with troops on board.

== Mutiny ==
The disrating of Midshipman David O'Brien Casey, an experienced junior officer who had served competently under Captain Pigot during the previous months, was one of the primary triggers to the mutiny. About a week before the mutiny, Casey was at his station on the main top, and Pigot noticed that a gasket, one of the ties that held the sail securely, had not been tied by one of the sailors under Casey's supervision. Brought before Pigot, Casey apologized and took responsibility for the oversight. Pigot demanded that Casey apologize on his knees, an unacceptable and debasing demand of a gentleman. When Casey twice refused to be humiliated in such a way, the captain ordered that he receive 12 lashes (more commonly a sailor's punishment than that of a junior officer), and he was disrated, which would effectively end his career as a naval officer. Casey was a popular officer amongst the crew and they felt that he was punished unfairly. The topmen began to plot mutiny.

Pigot had also developed the practice of frequently flogging the last sailor down from working aloft. On 20 September 1797, he ordered the topsails to be reefed after a squall struck the ship. Dissatisfied with the speed of the operation because "these would be the yard-arm men, the most skilful topmen" he gave the order that the last men off the yard would be flogged. This policy was particularly unreasonable as the men would be spaced along the yard, and the two whose stations were furthest out would always be the last down. Three young sailors, in their haste to get down, fell to their deaths on the deck. One of the sailors hit and injured the master, Mr. Southcott. Pigot ordered their bodies thrown into the sea with the words "throw the lubbers overboard"; a particularly offensive insult in the seaman's vocabulary. He then instructed two boatswain's mates to flog some of the topmen when they complained. Other topmen were flogged the next morning. (Note: However, Casey's account to the Admiralty does not contain this detail.)

The combination of the humiliation of Casey, the deaths of the three topmen, and the severe punishment of other sailors appears to have driven some of the crew to mutiny. These immediate factors were, however, also the final events in a series of harsh and brutal punishments by Pigot. Dudley Pope, in his book The Black Ship, argues that it was not Pigot's cruelty that drove the men to mutiny but his showing favouritism to some crewmen while inflicting overly harsh punishment on others. Had Pigot been more even-handed in his discipline, the mutiny might have been avoided.

The last surviving muster book, July 1797, reflects Hermione had a diverse crew, with about half of the crew born in England, and a fifth in Ireland. The remaining sailors were from Germany, Norway, America, Canada, Denmark, and Portugal. Two of the men were of African descent. At least twenty of these seaman were Americans, "among them mariners from Charleston, Norfolk, Philadelphia, New York and Nantucket." Of the twenty Americans aboard the Hermione, a slight majority appear to have received bonuses for "enlisting", with a distinct likelihood that the remainder had been pressed." As he had when in command of HMS Success, Captain Pigot continued to impress seamen. Many of these men were "pressed" or forcibly conscripted from merchant vessels. For example, six Americans were pressed on 4 July 1795, from the American merchant ship Two Brothers. This led to a diplomatic incident and the intervention of the American Consul, Silas Talbot, with their eventual release. Seaman John Farrel of New York and Bosun's Mate Thomas Nash of Waterford, Ireland would both take significant leadership roles during the mutiny.

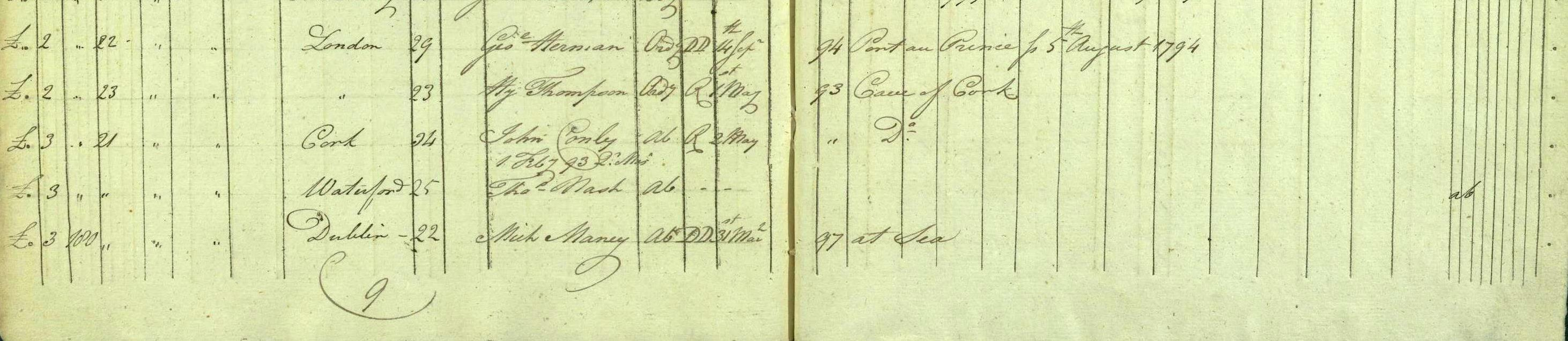
# 179, Thomas Nash, aka Jonanthan Robbins, AB born Waterford Ireland, British National Archives, HMS Hermione Muster 1797, (ADM 36/12011), p. 9

Thomas Nash aka Jonathan Robbins, after his extradition to Great Britain, was convicted of murder by court-martial in 1799 and hanged. However his case United States vs Robbins 1799 led to the historic decision to grant political asylum to refugees.

Mrs. Fanny Martin, the wife of boatswain William Martin, was aboard with Captain Pigot's approval. Her husband was murdered during the mutiny, and Mrs. Martin, on 16 February 1798, swore out a deposition against some of the mutineers. As a prosecution witness, however, Mrs. Martin was a mixed blessing, having by then blamed Captain Pigot's cruelty for the mutiny in a widely printed newspaper story. In 1803 though, Mrs. Martin was granted a pension by the Court of Navy Commissioners.

On the evening of 21 September 1797, a number of the crew, drunk on stolen rum, rushed Pigot's cabin and forced their way in after overpowering the marine stationed outside. They hacked at Pigot with knives and cutlasses before throwing him overboard. The mutineers, probably led by a core group of just 18 men, went on to murder another eight of Hermione's officers: the first lieutenant, Samuel Reed; the second lieutenant, Archibald Douglas; the third lieutenant, Henry Foreshaw; the marine commander, Lieutenant McIntosh; boatswain William Martin; purser Stephen Turner Pacey; surgeon H.T. Sansum; and the captain's clerk. Two midshipmen were also killed, and all the bodies were thrown overboard.

Subsequent court-martial testimony by a surviving midshipman describes the behavior of the mutineers as "truly savage and brutal". Pigot and a number of other victims were still alive when they were thrown overboard, while the marine officer McIntosh was dying of yellow fever when the mutineers dragged him from his bunk. Third Lieutenant Foreshaw had fallen on a mizen chain whaler platform extending from the side of the ship, but was hacked to death when he regained the deck. The majority of the crew emerged leaderless from their sleeping quarters to a scene of chaos. No effort was made to oppose those actively involved in the mutiny, even by the sailors whom Pigot had brought with him from his previous ship and generally favoured.

Three warrant officers survived: the mutineers refrained from killing the gunner and carpenter because they were considered useful to the ship, and Southcott, the master, was spared so he could navigate. Southcott lived to be a key witness, along with Casey, who was also spared, and their eyewitness accounts and testimony were critical to the trials of many of the mutineers. Three petty officers joined the mutiny together with one midshipman, Surgeon's Mate Cronin, and Master's Mate Turner.

Fearing retribution for their actions, the mutineers decided to navigate the ship toward Spanish waters. One reason the master's life was spared was that Turner could not navigate the ship properly without his help. Hermione sailed to La Guaira, where the mutineers handed the ship over to the Spanish authorities. The mutineers claimed they had set the officers adrift in a small boat, as had happened in the mutiny on the Bounty some eight years earlier. The Spanish gave the mutineers just 25 dollars each in return, and presented them with the options of joining the Spanish colonial army, heavy labour, or being employed in refitting their ship. The Spaniards took Hermione into service under the name Santa Cecilia; her crew included 25 of the former seamen, who remained under Spanish guard.

Only one of the small detachment of marines on board participated in the mutiny. While the half-dozen remaining were too outnumbered and taken by surprise to fulfill their role of shipboard police and oppose the mutineers, they remained under the leadership of a sergeant and insisted on being treated as prisoners of war by the Spanish authorities. The marines were accordingly exchanged six months later, along with the surviving warrant officers. HMS Valiant later captured some of the mutineers on a French privateer, Petite Magicienne.

== Recapture and renaming ==
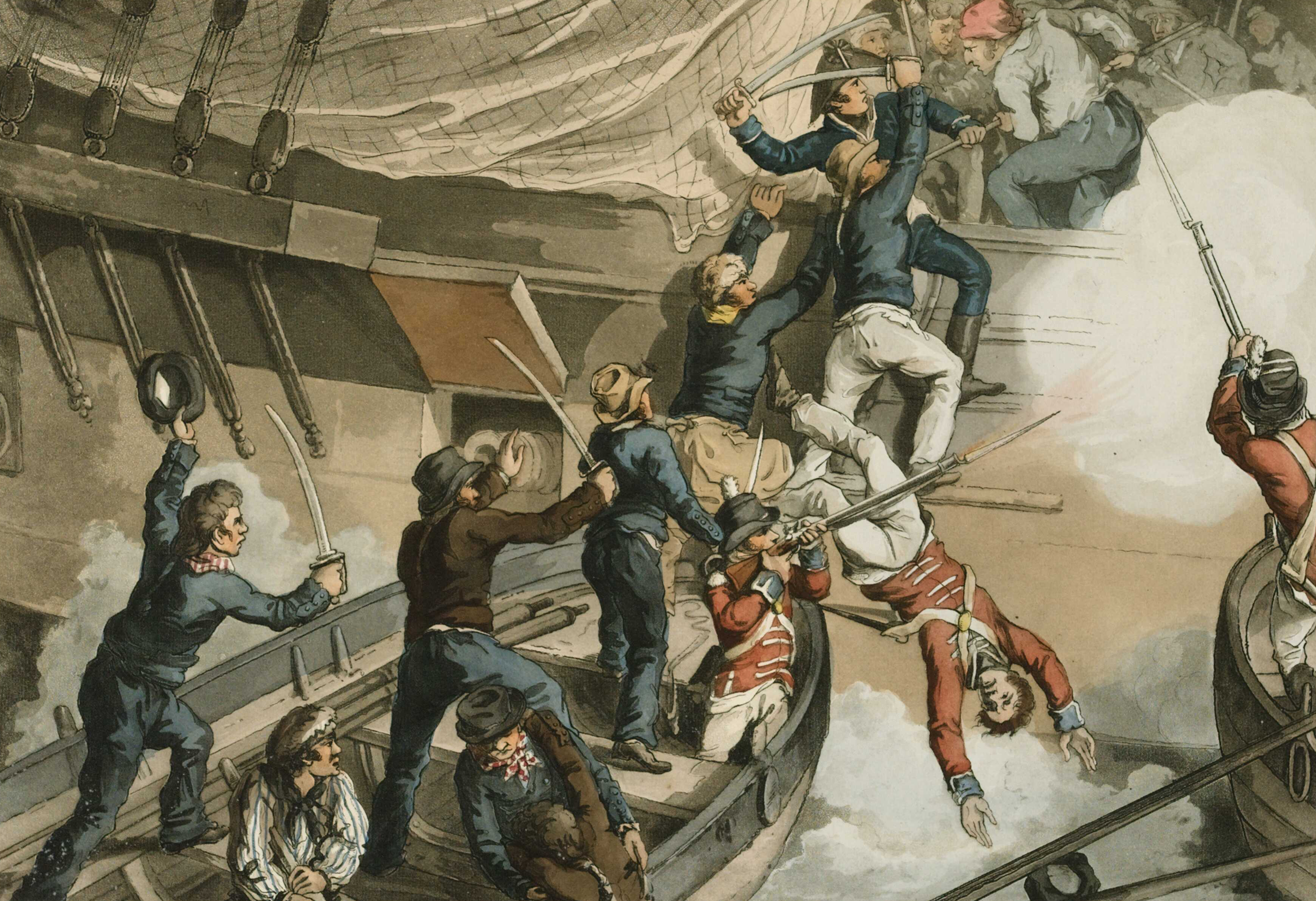
British sailors and marines boarding Hermione

Meanwhile, news of the fate of HMS Hermione reached Admiral Sir Hyde Parker when HMS Diligence captured a Spanish schooner. Parker wrote to the governor of La Guaira, demanding the return of the ship and the surrender of the mutineers. Meanwhile, he despatched HMS Magicienne under Captain Henry Ricketts to commence negotiations. Parker also set up a system of informers and posted rewards that eventually led to the capture of 33 of the mutineers, some of whom were tried aboard HMS York, and at least one aboard HMS Gladiator. Of these, 24 were hanged and gibbetted, one was transported, and eight were acquitted or pardoned. To Parker's fury, Admiral Richard Rodney Bligh (Note: Admiral Bligh was a cousin to Captain William Bligh of Bounty mutiny notoriety.) had issued pardons to several crew members. These included Pigot's elderly servant and the servant's twelve-year-old son, who Bligh concluded could not reasonably have been expected to resist armed mutineers. Acting against regulations, Parker forced Bligh to resign his command and return to Britain in the summer of 1799.

Meanwhile the Santa Cecilia, under the command of Captain Ramón Echalaz, was moved to Puerto Cabello, heavily manned, with around 400 Spanish crewmen on board. The ship lay under the guns of two shore batteries, together mounting some 200 cannons. Captain Edward Hamilton, aboard HMS Surprise, cut her out of the harbour on 25 October 1799. Hamilton led a boarding party to retake Hermione and, after an exceptionally bloody action, sailed her out of danger under Spanish gunfire. The Spanish casualties included 119 dead; the British took 231 Spaniards prisoner, while another fifteen jumped or fell overboard. Hamilton had eleven men injured, four seriously, but none killed. Hamilton himself was severely wounded.

For his daring exploit, Hamilton was made a knight by letters patent, a Knight Commander of the Order of the Bath (2 January 1815), and eventually became a baronet (20 October 1818). The Jamaica House of Assembly awarded him a sword worth 300 guineas, and the City of London awarded him the Freedom of the City in a public dinner on 25 October 1800. (Note: While Hamilton was on his way back to England in April 1800, a French privateer captured the packet in which he was sailing; however, he was soon exchanged for a French officer. Later, a court-martial would dismiss Hamilton from the Navy for having administered excessive and illegal punishment to the gunner and gunner's mates on HMS Trent, which he captained. Hamilton was later reinstated.) In 1847, the Admiralty awarded Hamilton a gold medal for the recapture of Hermione, and the Naval General Service Medal with the clasp, "Surprise with Hermione", to the seven surviving claimants from the action.

== Return to British service ==
Parker renamed Santa Cecilia Retaliation. In late 1799 or early 1800, Retaliation captured four vessels. These were the two American brigs Gracey, sailing from Trinidad bound for Baltimore with a cargo of sugar, honey, and hides; Peggy, sailing from Cartagena to New York with a cargo of sugar, coffee, cotton, fustick, and hides; and the Danish sloop Sisters, which was sailing from Jamaica to Baltimore with a cargo of sugar, and which had just left St Thomas.

The Admiralty then renamed her Retribution on 31 January 1800. She was recommissioned in September 1800, at Jamaica under Captain Samuel Forster. Apparently before that she detained an American schooner sailing from Port Republic with a cargo of coffee and logwood. In early 1801, Retribution detained the Spanish schooner La Linda, which was sailing from Campeachy to Havana, and the American schooner Sea Horse, which was sailing from Porto Cavello to New York. Retribution sent both into Jamaica. On 1 October, Melampus, Juno, and Retribution were in company when they captured Aquila. (Note: Head money was paid in 1829. A first-class share was worth £33 18s. 3½d.; a fifth-class share, that of a seaman, was worth 2s. 4¼d.)

== Fate ==
Retribution arrived at Portsmouth on 20 January 1802, and sailed for Woolwich on 6 February, to be paid off from the Navy. She was subsequently fitted out at Woolwich in October 1803 for a brief service for Trinity House at a cost of £484, equal to £43,018.06 today; she sailed on her first voyage for Trinity House on 16 October. She arrived at Deptford on 8 June 1804, docked in August 1804, to have her copper sheathing removed, and was finally broken up there in June 1805.

== See also ==
- List of ships captured in the 19th century
