= HMS Diligence (1795) =

Sloop of the Royal Navy

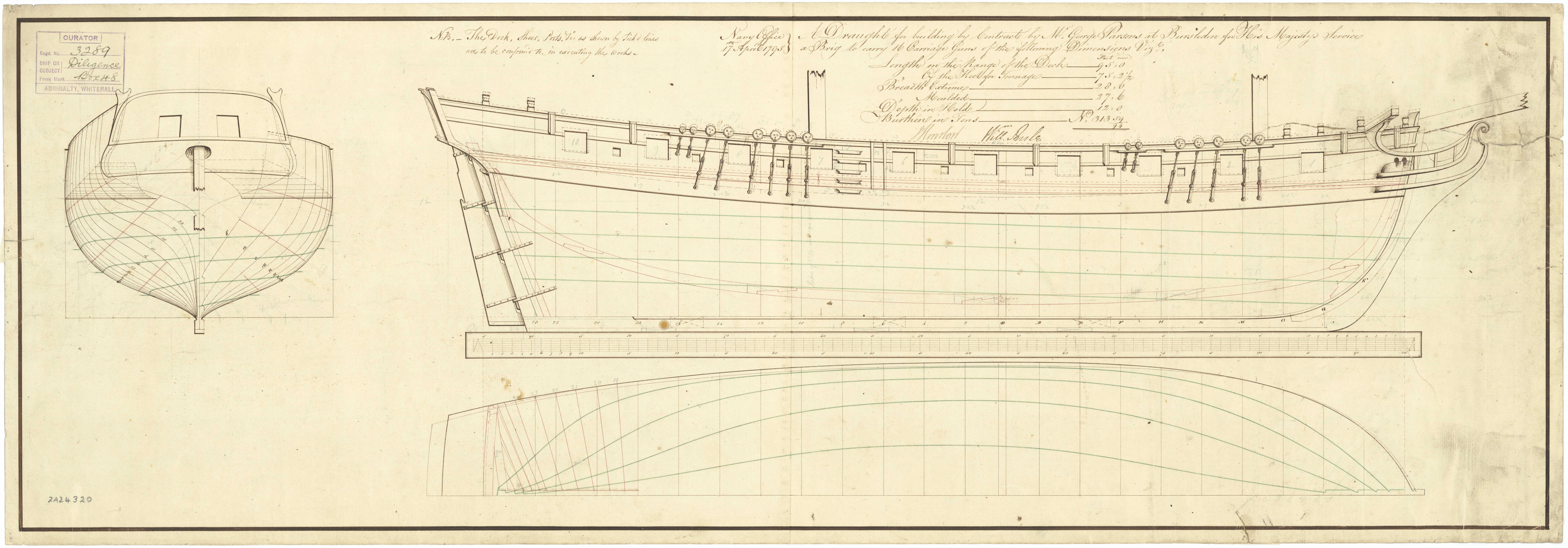
- Drawing showing the body plan with stern board outline, sheer lines with scroll figurehead, and longitudinal half-breadth for the Diligence, 1795

History

Great Britain
- Name: HMS Diligence
- Ordered: 4 & 18 March 1795
- Builder: John Parsons, Bursledon
- Laid down: April 1795
- Launched: 24 November 1795
- Commissioned: 26 November 1795 – 20 February 1796
- Fate: Wrecked 8 October 1800

General characteristics
- Class & type: Diligence-class brig-sloop
- Type: 18-gun brig-sloop
- Tons burthen: 318 41/94 (bm)
- Length: Gundeck: 95 ft 0 1/2 in (29.0 m); Keel: 75 ft 1 1/2 in (22.9 m)
- Beam: 28 ft 2 3/41 in (8.6 m)
- Depth of hold: 12 ft 1 1/4 in (3.7 m)
- Sail plan: Brig
- Complement: 121
- Armament: 16 × 32-pounder carronades; 2 × 6-pounder chase guns

HMS Diligence was the name ship of her class of brig-sloops of the Royal Navy. She was launched in 1795 and lost in 1800. She spent her brief career on the Jamaica station where she captured four armed vessels, one of them after a short engagement, and many small Spanish and French merchant vessels in the Caribbean inter-island and coastal trade.

== Career ==
Originally her name was Spencer but she was renamed Diligence in 1795. She was commissioned in November 1795 under Commander John West, who sailed her for Jamaica on 16 April 1796. She remained on the Jamaica station and in January 1797 Commander Robert Mends replaced West.

In early 1797 Diligence captured the Fogouse, a privateer of six guns and 57 men.

Diligence cleared the Bahama Straits on 3 March and the next day she was ten leagues SW of the Pan of Motonzas when she encountered and captured Nativetas (or Natividad) after an action that lasted three-quarters of an hour. Nativetas was about 500 tons (bm), was armed with 16 guns, and carried a crew of 50 men. She was carrying a cargo of logwood and had that day left Havana for Cadiz.

In September Diligence was in company with Hermione and Renommee when Diligence captured a Spanish packet ship of six guns that was also carrying troops.

On 27 September, Diligence captured the French privateer Epervier (or Espervier). Head money for 57 men was paid in July 1830. (Note: A first-class share of the head money was worth £75 0s 6d; a fifth-class share, that of a seaman, was worth 12s 7 3/4d.)

In late 1797 or early 1798, the frigate Magicienne, troopship Regulus, and Diligence captured the French privateer Brutus, of nine guns.

By late 1798, Diligence had captured 13 merchant vessels. She took seven more in early 1799. Then she took a Dutch schooner, laden with provisions. Next, she captured another Dutch schooner, the Governor Lauffer, of 90 tons (bm), two guns and 19 men. Governor Lauffer was carrying coffee from Jackamel to Curacoa. Diligence also captured the Dutch schooner Kleine, which was taking dry goods and provisions from Curacoa to Acquain, and the French schooner Helene, which was carrying coffee from Jackamel to Curacoa. Diligence's boats cut out a French schooner in ballast from Maregot. In mid-1799 she captured more merchant vessels, mostly schooners. Polly was sailing under Danish colours but under "irregular" passes and had a crew of Dutchmen and Spaniards. She was carrying coffee from Curacoa to Saint Thomas. Foregat too was sailing under Danish colours, with a Spanish crew. She was sailing from Jacquemel to Saint Thomas with 30,000 pounds of coffee. A Spanish schooner that was coppered and designed like a Virginia pilot boat was carrying 45,000 pounds of coffee from Saint Martha to Curacoa. Lastly, Diligence's boats destroyed a Dutch schooner, a French schooner, and a sloop-rigged boat in the Gulf of Venezuela.

From November 1799 the frigate Trent and Diligence captured or destroyed even more merchant vessels. One was the French schooner Constance, of 17 men, which was carrying coffee from Lans de Naud to St. Jago. There were two French schooners of unknown names carrying coffee from Tuenice to St Jago. Trent and Diligence detained the ship Washington, which was sailing in ballast from Curacoa to Baltimore. Diligence took several vessels by herself. One was the Danish schooner Margarette, of 60 tons (bm) and ten men, which was carrying coffee from Jacquemel to St Thomas. Another was the Spanish schooner Del Carmen, of 35 tons (bm) and 11 men, was carrying mahogany from St Domingo to Curacoa. Diligence's boats cut out of Corro a Spanish sloop of 70 tons (bm) and eight men and two unnamed schooners of 30 tons, all laden with mahogany. Diligence captured the Danish schooner Mahomet, of 140 tons (bm) and 14 men, which was carrying coffee from Aux Cayes to Curacoa. Then Diligence's boats cut out the French brig Bon Adventure, of 140 tons (bm) and her cargo of coffee from Lans de Naud Bay. The American schooner Harriott, of 90 tons and 11 men, was carrying mahogany, coffee, and sugar from St Domingo to Boston. The Spanish brig Esperanso, of 100 tons, was laden with mahogany when Diligence's boats cut her out of the Macoris River, east of St Domingo. A Spanish felucca of 60 tons (bm) with a cargo of mahogany was cut out of the Romain River, near St Catherines. Lastly, Diligence captured the Hamburg brig Gluk Luke Peter, of 160 tons (bm) and nine men, which was carrying coffee, cocoa, and indigo from La Guira to Hamburg. The Danish Schooner Margaretta, which had been sailing from Jacquemel to St. Thomas's with coffee and cotton had fallen prey to a Spanish privateer; Diligence detained Margaretta, and Echo captured the privateer. The French schooner Artibonelte was sailing from Mole St. Nicholas to St. Marcs with provisions. The French sloop Gorade too was sailing from the Mole with provisions, but to Tiberoon. Diligence burnt the French schooner Christine, which had been sailing from the Mole in ballast. When Diligence intercepted a French schooner sailing from Cap François to Port Dauphin with dry goods, the British took the cargo but let the vessel alone as she was of no value. However, Diligence detained the Danish schooner Betsey Loyed, which was sailing from Baltimore to St Thomas, and the American ship Aurora, sailing from Norfolk to Carthagena, with provisions, wine, raisins, and the like. Lastly, Diligence captured the Spanish schooner N.S. Montfretta, which was carrying rice and tobacco from St. Domingo to San Juan.

From March 1800 captured more merchant vessels. She captured the Spanish vessel Diana, which was carrying logwood, the Spanish sloop Ovier, laden with dry goods, the French schooner Eagle, which was carrying coffee, and the Spanish schooner Consualidad, which was carrying mules from Porto Cavallo. Diligence's boats cut the Dutch brig Minerva and her cargo of mahogany out of the Higuay (Higüey) River, and the Spanish brig Del Carpner and her cargo of mahogany. Diligence also captured the French schooner Rosario, which was carrying coffee from Jeremie to Curacoa, and the Danish sloop Aurora sailing from St Croix to Aux Cayes. Diligence's boats cut out a Danish brig and ship from the River Triest, both of which were carrying mahogany. Diligence and Volage detained the American brig Resolution, carrying coffee, hides, and cocoa, and Diligence and Surprise detained the Danish schooner Foresight, carrying coffee from Acquin to St Thomas.

In May 1800 Mends was promoted to post captain, and Commander Charles B.H. Ross replaced him as captain of Diligence in June.

== Loss ==
On 8 October 1800 Diligence was cruising the north coast of Cuba in search of a Spanish polacre privateer reported to be in the area. At 7:30 in the evening Diligence hit a reef. Despite efforts to lighten her, she remained stuck on the reef and filling with water. Daylight revealed that she was five miles from shore so she used her boats to transfer provisions and some of her crew there. The next day, Thunderer came on the scene and rescued the entire crew. The British set fire to Diligence as they left. It turned out that she had hit an uncharted shoal near Rio Puercos.
