= Hyde Parker (Royal Navy officer, born 1739) =

Royal Navy officer (1739–1807)

Admiral Sir Hyde Parker
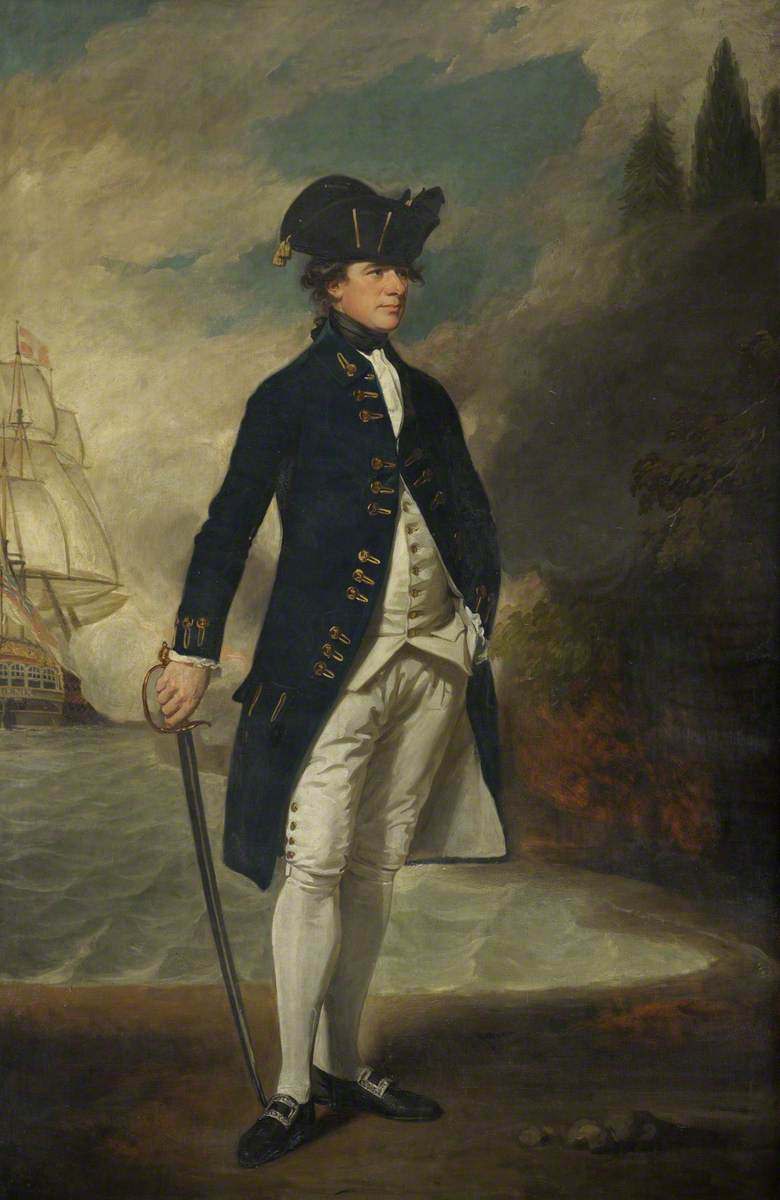
- Portrait by George Romney, c. 1760
- Born: 1739; Devonshire, England
- Died: 16 March 1807 (aged 67–68); London, England
- Military career
- Allegiance: Great Britain; United Kingdom
- Branch: Royal Navy
- Service years: 1751–1807
- Rank: Admiral of the White
- Commands: North Sea Fleet; Leeward Islands Station; Jamaica Station; Baltic Fleet
- Conflicts: Seven Years' War; American War of Independence; New York and New Jersey campaign; Capture of Savannah; Battle of Cape Spartel; Fourth Anglo-Dutch War; Battle of Dogger Bank (1781); French Revolutionary Wars; Mediterranean campaign of 1793–1796; Siege of Toulon (1793); Invasion of Corsica (1794); Battle of Genoa (1795); Battle of the Hyères Islands; Battle of Copenhagen (1801)

Admiral of the White Sir Hyde Parker (1739 – 16 March 1807) was a Royal Navy officer who served in the Seven Years' War, American War of Independence and French Revolutionary Wars.

== Life ==
Hyde Parker was born in 1739 in Devonshire, the second son of Sir Hyde Parker, 5th Baronet. He joined the Royal Navy in 1751 as a midshipman onboard his father's ship HMS Vanguard, transferring to HMS Cruizer alongside the elder Parker before the younger Parker transferred to HMS Medway. Parker was promoted to lieutenant on 25 January 1758 onboard HMS Brilliant during the Seven Years' War. On 16 December 1762 was promoted to command Manila, from which, on 18 July 1763, he was posted to Baleine.

From 1766 onwards for many years he served in the West Indies and in North American waters, particularly distinguishing himself during the New York and New Jersey campaign in breaking past the American defences at the North River in 1776 as captain of HMS Phoenix. His services on this occasion earned him a knighthood in 1779. In 1778 he participated in the capture of Savannah, and in the following year his ship was wrecked on the Cuban coast. His men, however, entrenched themselves, and were in the end brought off safely. He became commander-in-chief of the Leeward Islands Station in 1779.

Parker served under his father at the Battle of Dogger Bank, and served under Admiral of the Blue Richard Howe at the Battle of Cape Spartel. He was promoted to Rear-Admiral of the White on 1 February 1793, the same day that Revolutionary France declared war on Britain. Parker served under Vice-Admiral of the Red Lord Hood at the siege of Toulon and invasion of Corsica. He was promoted to Vice-Admiral of the Blue on 4 July 1794 and took part in the battles of Genoa and Hyères Islands under Vice-Admiral of the Red William Hotham. From 1796 to 1800 he was in command at the Jamaica Station and ably conducted British naval operations in the West Indies. These included the tracking down and execution of a number of crewmen involved in the mutiny on board HMS Hermione in 1797. On 14 February 1799 Parker was promoted to Admiral of the White.

In 1801 he was appointed to command the Baltic Fleet ordered to break up the Second League of Armed Neutrality, with Vice-Admiral of the Blue Sir Horatio Nelson as his second-in-command. Copenhagen, the first objective of the expedition, fell in the Battle of Copenhagen on 2 April 1801 to the fierce attack of Nelson's squadron – Parker, with the heavier ships, taking little part due to the shallowness of the channel. At the height of the battle Parker, who was loath to infringe the customary rules of naval warfare, raised the flag to disengage. Famously, Nelson ignored the order from his commander by raising his telescope to his blind eye and exclaiming "I really do not see the signal " (although this is generally accepted to be a myth). Nelson pressed on with the action and ultimately triumphed over the Danish fleet. Parker's hesitation to advance up the Baltic Sea after his victory was later severely criticised. Soon afterwards he was recalled and Nelson succeeded him. He died on 16 March 1807. (Note: "Bromley mentions two portraits of Parker: one by Sir Joshua Reynolds, which was engraved by C. Townley, and the other by Romney, engraved in 1780 by J. Walker" (Laughton 1895, p. 245).)

== Character assessment ==
In Parker's entry in the Oxford Dictionary of National Biography his biographer Clive Wilkinson writes that until the Copenhagen affair he had "a good professional reputation" but after Copenhagen he was "considered irresolute and dilatory. In Wilson's opinion "As an officer, Parker was an able administrator rather than a great leader and this was to prove a weakness when it came to having both St Vincent as his chief and Nelson as a subordinate"; and that "He was evidently a popular man for as Nelson wrote after Copenhagen:"

We all respect and love Sir Hyde; but the dearer his friends, the more uneasy they have been at his idleness for that is the truth—no criminality. I believe Sir H. P. to be as good a subject as His Majesty has.

== Family ==
Parker was twice married: first, to Anne, daughter of John Palmer Boteler, and by her had three sons; second, in 1800, he married Frances, a daughter of Admiral Sir Richard Onslow, and made their home at the manor house in Benhall on the Suffolk coast.

His first son – the third Hyde Parker (1786–1854) – became a rear admiral in turn on 23 November 1841 and vice admiral on 4 June 1852. From 1853 he served as First Sea Lord of the Royal Navy, and died on 25 May 1854. His son Hyde, a captain in the navy, commanded Firebrand in the Black Sea, and was killed on 8 July 1854 when storming a Russian fort at the mouth of the Danube.

Two other notable family members who fought in the Napoleonic wars are Parker's second son, John Boteler Parker, who died a major general and C.B. in 1851, and the youngest, Harry, a lieutenant in the guards, who fell at the Battle of Talavera.

== Notes ==
Military offices
Preceded by John Byron	Commander-in-Chief, Leeward Islands Station; 1779–1780	Succeeded by Sir George Brydges Rodney
Preceded by Richard Rodney Bligh	Commander-in-Chief, Jamaica Station; 1796–1800	Succeeded by Lord Hugh Seymour
