= HMS Surprise (1796) =

Frigate of the Royal Navy

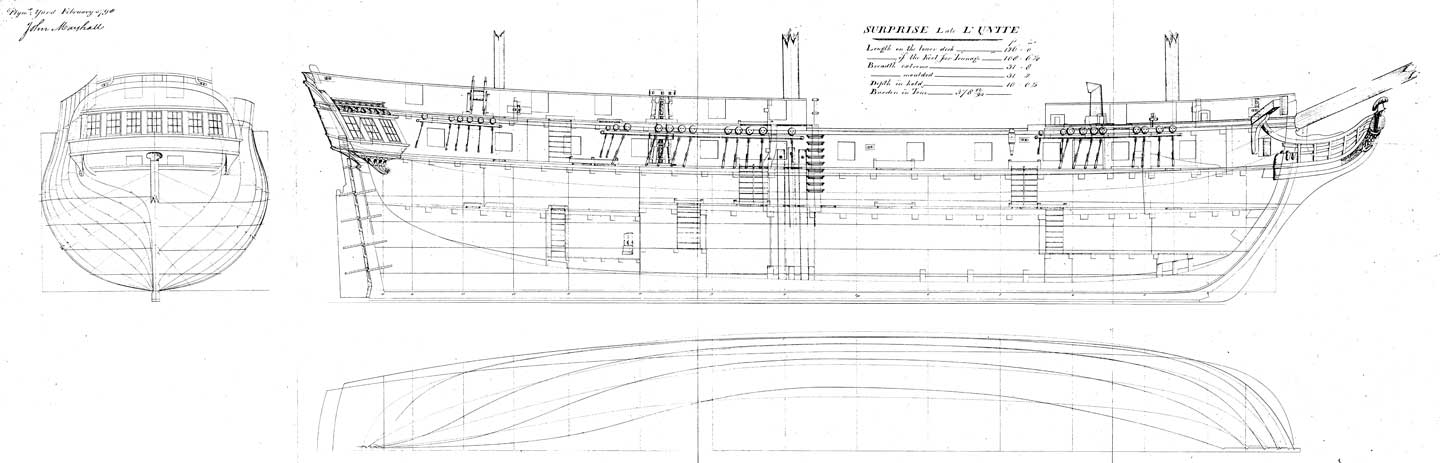
- Contemporary plans of HMS Surprise

History

France
- Name: Unité
- Builder: Jean Fouache, Le Havre
- Laid down: August 1793
- Launched: 16 January 1794
- Commissioned: April 1794
- Captured: 20 April 1796 by HMS Inconstant

Great Britain
- Name: HMS Surprise
- Operator: Royal Navy
- Acquired: 1796 by purchase of a prize
- Fate: Sold at Deptford in February 1802

General characteristics
- Class & type: Unité-class corvette
- Displacement: 657 tons
- Tons burthen: 57873/94 bm
- Length: 126 ft 0 in (38.4 m); 108 ft 6 1/8 in (33.1 m) keel
- Beam: 31 ft 8 in (9.7 m)
- Draught: 14 ft 0 1/2 in (4.3 m)
- Depth of hold: 10 ft 0 in (3.0 m)
- Sail plan: Full-rigged ship
- Complement: 172 (peace) & 220 (war)
- Armament: As Unité; 24 × 8-pounder long guns; 8 × 4-pounder long guns; As HMS Surprise; Upper deck: 24 × 9-pounder guns; QD: 8 × 4-pounder guns + 4 × 12-pounder carronades; Fc: 2 × 4-pounder chase guns + 2 × 12-pounder carronades

HMS Surprise was the name the Royal Navy gave to the French Navy's corvette Unité after its capture in 1796. Unité was launched on 16 January 1794. Surprise gained fame in 1799 for the recapture of HMS Hermione. In 1802 Surprise was sold out of the service.

Historical fiction author Patrick O'Brian set many of his Aubrey–Maturin series aboard HMS Surprise. The 2003 film adaptation of his books, Master and Commander: The Far Side of the World, would also be set aboard it.

== Construction ==
Pierre-Alexandre Forfait designed Unité, the name ship for a class of corvette. Although the French initially rated Unité as a corvette, the ships of her class bridged a gap between smaller warships and frigates, and at various times were rated as frigates.

== French service ==
On 20 March 1794, lieutenant de vaisseau Jean le Drézénec, who was 41 years old and had entered the naval service soon after the revolution from a career in the merchant service, arrived to take command of Unité. He supervised the fitting out of the ship, and found the long guns were too large to be easily reloaded, and the lower sails were also too large. He notified the authorities, who urged him to finish fitting out the ship because a major naval operation was imminent. Soon afterwards, Unité took part in the battle of the Glorious First of June by escorting the dismasted Révolutionnaire as she was towed by the Audacieux.

In June 1794 Unité completed repairs in Saint-Malo and Brest to damage she had sustained in the battle. In the following months she escorted merchant vessels along the coasts of France. On 28 September, with the corvette Bergere and under the command of Lieutenant de Vaisseau Gouley, the two ships left Brest to sail northwest in between Ireland and the islands of the Hebrides and St Kilda to intercept enemy merchant ships. On 17 October, the ships captured a 200-ton merchant ship Dianne. The next day the weather turned foul and the two ships were separated. Unwilling or unable to continue the mission alone, Unité searched for Bergere fruitlessly for sixteen days before finally returning to Brest on 1 November.

== Capture by the Royal Navy ==
After repairs, Unité was ordered to join the Mediterranean fleet at Toulon, and arrived there in March 1795. She spent the remainder of the year either blockaded in port or serving as a courier. In April 1796, she was ordered on one such courier mission to North Africa to deliver personnel and messages to the port of Bône. At the time, Le Drézénec, who had been recently promoted to capitaine de frégate, was suffering from smallpox and was incapacitated. Consequently, her first lieutenant, Lieutenant Le Breton, commanded Unité.

Captain Thomas Fremantle in command of the frigate HMS Inconstant had heard there was a French frigate in Bône, and sailed to intercept her. When Unité arrived in the afternoon of 20 April 1796, the watch aboard Unité wrongly identified Inconstant as a neutral vessel and Le Breton did not clear the ship for action. About an hour later, Inconstant sailed alongside, boarded and captured Unité intact.

== Royal Navy ==
Commander Edward Hamilton commissioned Surprise in June 1796. He sailed for Jamaica on 29 July. He was promoted to post captain in July 1797. She returned to England and underwent refitting at Plymouth between January and May 1798.

She returned to the Caribbean and sailed on the Jamaica station.

In November, Surprise and Amaranthe captured the French 4-gun privateer Petite Française.

On 19 March 1799 Surprise captured Betsey and the 5-gun Lionne.

At 8 P.M. on 15 April, she captured a French privateer. At 1 A. M. on 16 April, Surprise recaptured the American merchant ship Britannia, which the French privateer had captured on 15 April.

On 17 April, Surprise captured Chien de Chasse. (Note: In the year leading up to her capture, Chien de Chasse had captured four merchant vessels from the United States: Phoebe (21 April 1798), Active and Lydia (both 9 May 1798), and Hopewell (16 April 1799). When Surprise captured Chien de Chasse she also recaptured Hopewell. Chien de Chasse's captain had pressed five American sailors from Hopewell, and Hamilton proceeded to press the same five for Surprise, despite remonstrations by Henry Dandelot, Hopewell's master. A Vice admiralty court at St Jago de la Vega condemned Hopewell and her entire cargo to the benefit of Surprise. Hopewell's owner appealed to the High Court of Admiralty in London, which reduced Surprise's claim to costs plus one-eighth of the value of vessel and cargo.)

On 10 October 1799, in the harbour of Aruba Surprise used her boats to cut out a privateer of ten guns, and two sloops. One of her officers, an acting lieutenant, was killed in the action. She then sailed on to Venezuela.

=== Recapture of HMS Hermione ===
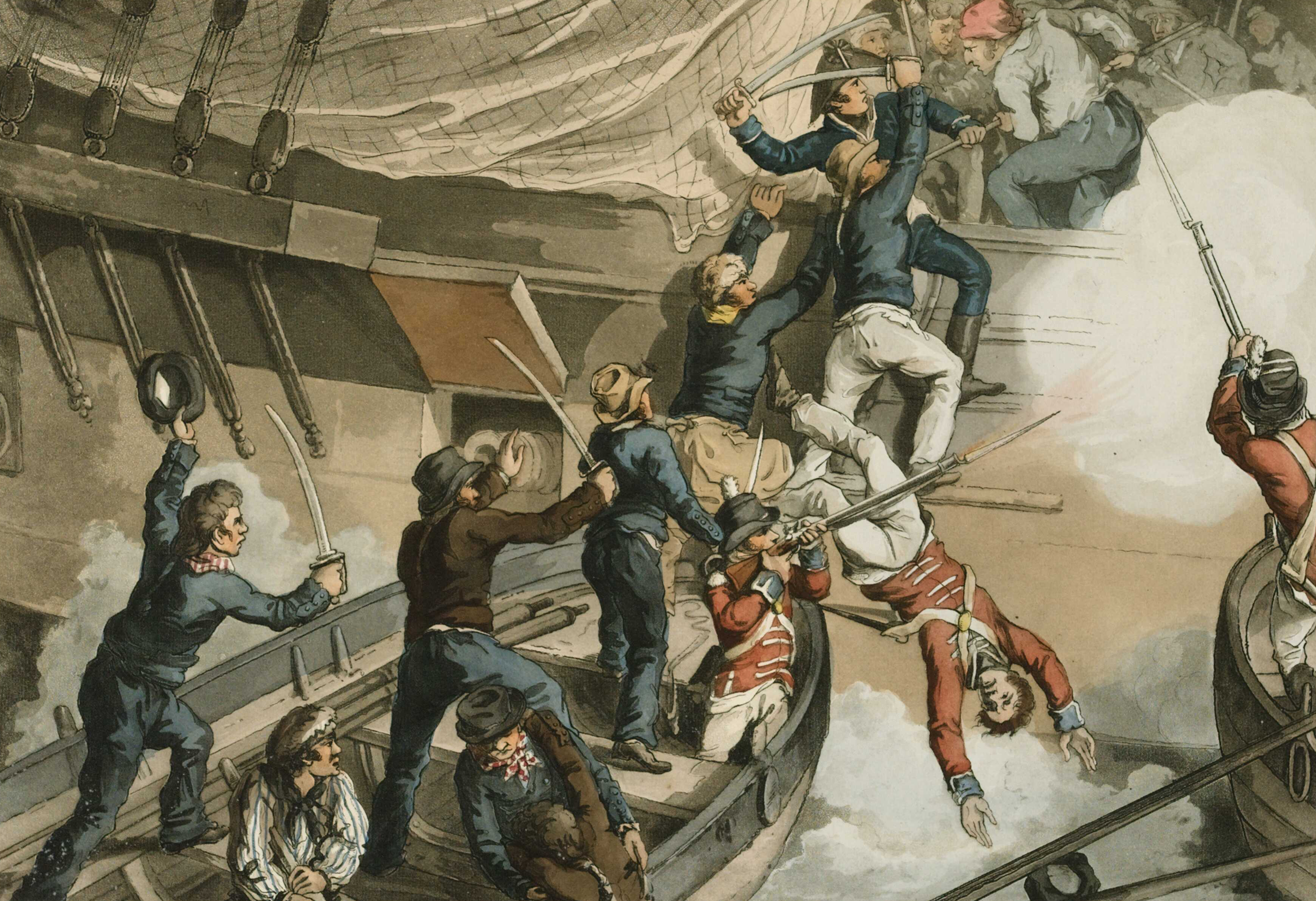
The crew of Surprise boarding Hermione

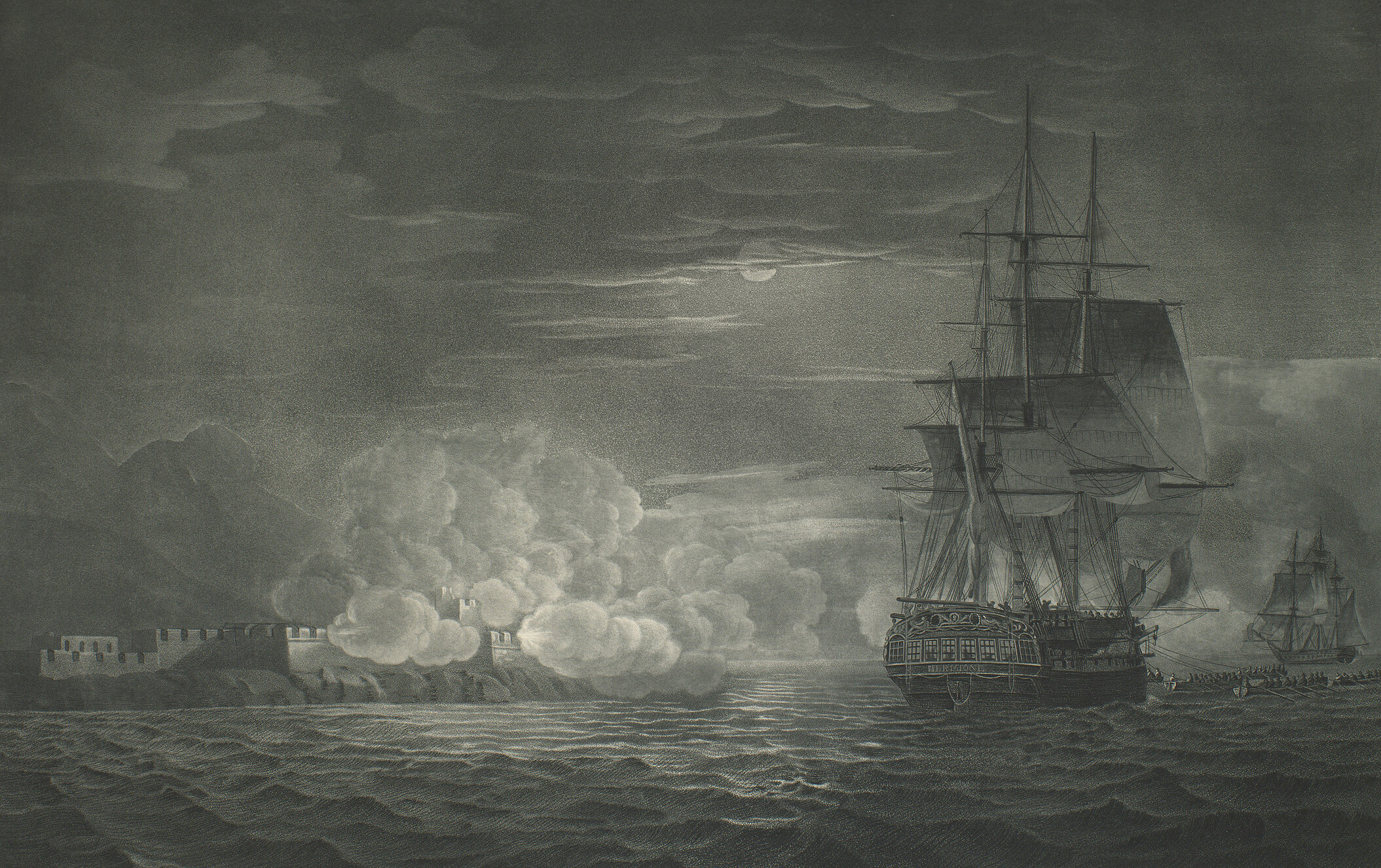
Boats from Surprise (far right) towing Hermione away from the fort's batteries

Surprise gained fame for the cutting-out expedition on 25 October 1799, of HMS Hermione. Hermione's crew had mutinied, and had sailed her into the Spanish possession of Puerto Cabello. Captain Edward Hamilton of Surprise led a boarding party to retake Hermione and, after an exceptionally bloody action, sailed her out under Spanish gunfire. The Spanish casualties included 119 dead; 231 were taken prisoner, while another 15 jumped or fell overboard. Hamilton had 11 injured, four seriously, but none killed. In January 1801 Captain Christopher Laroche assumed command of Surprise. Captain James Oswald replaced Laroche in August.

== Fate ==
After the Treaty of Amiens, the Royal Navy sold Surprise out of the service at Deptford in February 1802 and she was broken up.

== Surprise in fiction ==
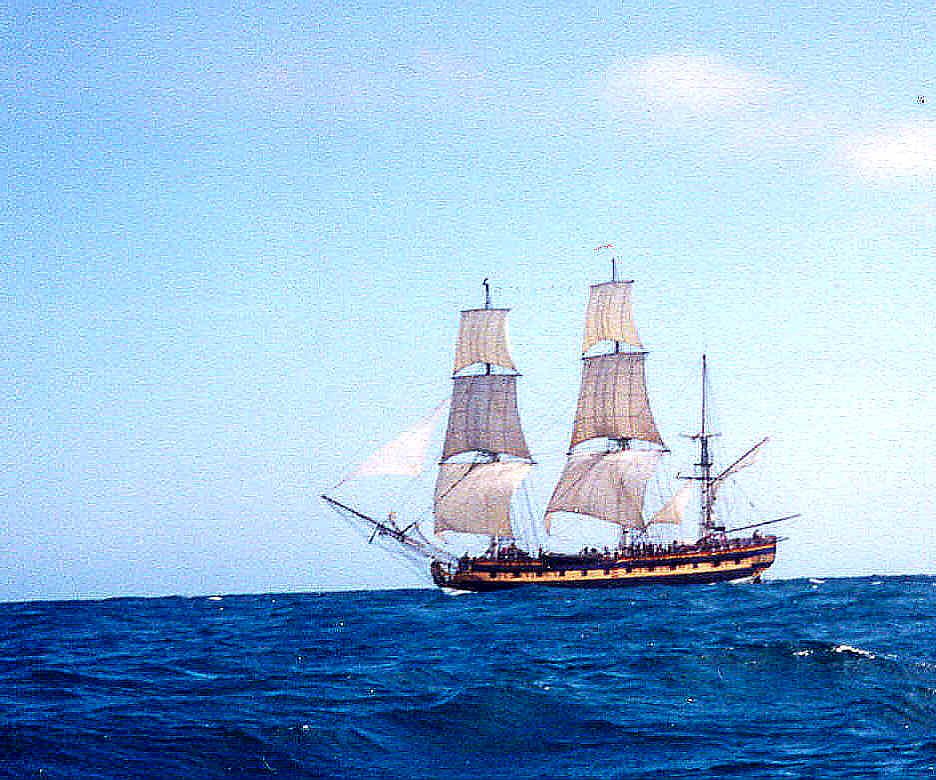
The replica of HMS Rose in 2000 painted to resemble Surprise at O'Brian's suggestion

HMS Surprise was the ship chosen by author Patrick O'Brian to restore Captain "Lucky" Jack Aubrey of the Aubrey–Maturin series to his place as a captain, and eventually see him raise his flag as an admiral of the Royal Navy. Surprise is an important element of the series, both because of her importance to the running plotline, and because of the emotional attachment she has earned among the characters in the book and real life fans of the series.

In the late 1990s, publisher W. W. Norton & Company rented the replica of HMS Rose in New York for a pier-side party to celebrate the publication of Patrick O’Brian's latest novel. O’Brian himself was present, and he casually mentioned to the frigate's captain, Richard Bailey, that if the Rose were painted in an 1805 colour scheme she would be a "dead ringer" for the frigate Surprise that appeared in his books. Bailey quickly ordered his crew to get out the paint and make the changes. O’Brian was so impressed that he changed his mind about his prohibition of having any of his books converted into film, and Norton immediately started looking for a Hollywood production company. For the 2003 film Master and Commander: The Far Side of the World, the role of Surprise was filled by the same replica of HMS Rose, which was purchased by the film studio and extensively modified at Baja Studios to resemble the original Surprise for the role.

The book HMS Surprise by O'Brian also mentions Aubrey being a midshipman aboard Surprise. (Note: This chronology is contradicted by a later book in the series, The Wine-Dark Sea, which has Aubrey as a lieutenant in HMS Queen in 1792.) The series has the Surprise in service until O'Brian's extended fictional year of 1812, using the latitude of fiction in The Reverse of the Medal. In that era, the Royal Navy commissioned a 38-gun frigate by this name in September 1812.

The fictional Surprise is sold out of the service in The Reverse of the Medal, being purchased by Stephen Maturin and employed first as a letter of marque and later as His Majesty's hired ship Surprise under Aubrey's command. Maturin agrees to sell the Surprise to Aubrey in The Nutmeg of Consolation, though later novels suggest that never transpired and Maturin continued to own the ship. Surprise's ultimate fictional fate is unknown although she was still at sea in 1817 when Aubrey receives news of his promotion to Rear-Admiral of the Blue in her great cabin at the end of Blue at the Mizzen, the last completed novel in the series.

The Surprise public house in Chelsea, London, established in 1853, is named after the ship with the pub sign containing an image of the ship.
