= Boyne-class ship of the line (1810) =

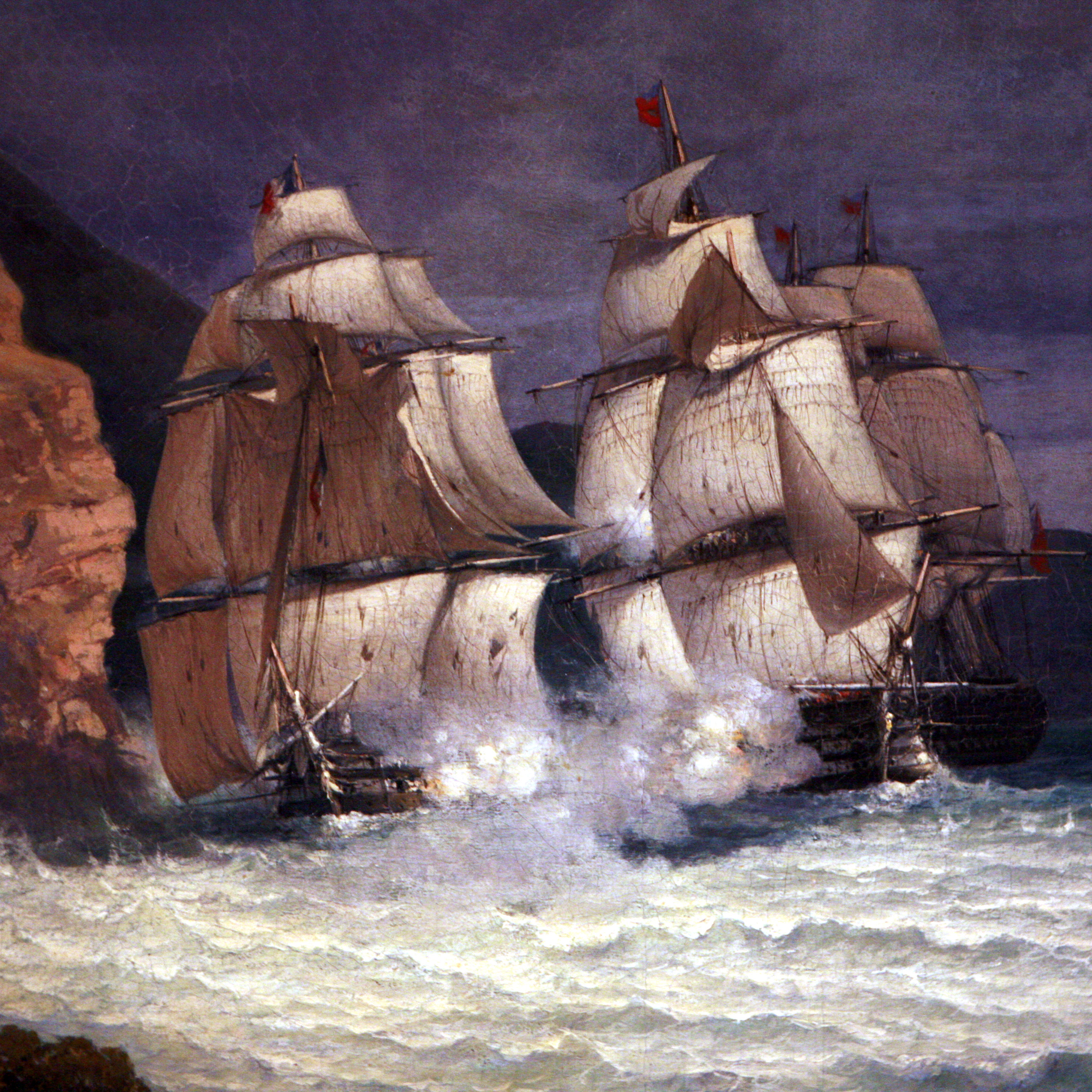
- Fight of the Romulus with Boyne and Caledonia

Class overview
- Name: Boyne
- Operators: Royal Navy
- Preceded by: Neptune class
- Succeeded by: Rodney class
- In service: 3 July 1810–1861
- Completed: 2
- Scrapped: 2

General characteristics as built
- Type: Ship of the line
- Tons burthen: 2,16222/94 (bm)
- Length: 186 ft (56.7 m) (at the gun deck)
- Beam: 51 ft 10 in (15.8 m)
- Draught: 18 ft 1 in (5.5 m)
- Depth of hold: 21 ft 6 in (6.6 m)
- Sail plan: Full-rigged ship
- Complement: 738
- Armament: 104 muzzle-loading, smoothbore guns; Lower gun deck: 28 × 32 pdr guns; Middle gun deck: 30 × 18 pdr guns; Upper gund eck: 30 × 12 pdr guns; Quarterdeck: 4 × 12 pdr guns, 8 × 32 pdr carronades; Forecastle: 2 × 12 pdrs, 2 × 32 pdr carronades

The Boyne class consisted of two 98-gun, second rate ships of the line built for the Royal Navy (RN) during the first decade of the 19th century. The sisters only saw active service during the last few years of the Napoleonic Wars and only Boyne actually saw combat. Union was placed in ordinary in 1814 and Boyne briefly served as a flagship in 1816 before she was placed in ordinary that same year. Boyne was cut down (razeed) into a two deck, 76-gun, third rate in 1826. Union was also ordered to be cut down the following year, but it was never completed and the ship was broken up for scrap in 1833.

Boyne was converted into a gunnery training ship in 1833–1834 and was renamed Excellent. She was renamed Queen Charlotte in 1859 and broken up in 1861.

== Design and description ==
The Boyne class were designed as copies of Sir Thomas Slade's Victory and were initially classified as 100-gun, first rate ships, although the design was revised to 98 guns around the time that construction began in 1806. This change made them second rates by the Admiralty's rating system. The Boyne-class ships measured 186 feet (56.7 m) on the gun deck and 153 feet 9 inches (46.9 m) on the keel. They had a beam of 51 feet 10 inches (15.8 m), a deep draught of 18 feet 1 inch (5.5 m), a depth of hold of 21 feet 6 inches (6.6 m) and had a tonnage of 2,162 22/94 tons burthen. The ships were armed with 104 muzzle-loading, smoothbore guns that consisted of twenty-eight 32-pounder guns on their lower gun deck, thirty 18-pounder guns on their middle gun deck and thirty 12-pounder guns on their upper gun deck. Their forecastle mounted four 12-pounder guns and a pair of 32-pounder carronades. On their quarterdeck they carried four 12-pounders and eight 32-pounder carronades.

Boyne was ordered to be cut down into a two-deck, 76-gun, third rate ship in 1826. Her crew was reduced to 650 men and her armament modernized, albeit in fewer number. The ship's lower gun deck was equipped with twenty-six 32-pounders (63 cwt) and two 68-pounder carronades while the upper gun deck had twenty-eight 32-pounders (54 cwt) and two 68-pounder carronades. A pair of 18-pounders and a dozen 32-pounder carronades were positioned on the quarterdeck and two 18-pounders and a pair of 32-pounder carronades were on the forecastle. In 1840 Boyne was ordered to exchange her 18-pounders for lightweight 32-pounder guns.

== Ships ==
Construction data
Ship	Builder	Ordered	Laid down	Launched	Commissioned	Fate
Boyne	HM Dockyard, Portsmouth	25 June 1801	April 1806	3 July 1810	January 1811	Scrapped, 25 June 1861
Union	HM Dockyard, Plymouth	16 September 1801	October 1805	16 November 1811	April 1812	Scrapped, March 1833

== Service history ==
Boyne was commissioned in January 1811 as the flagship of Rear-Admiral Sir Harry Burrard Neale. In February 1814 she unsuccessfully fought the French 74-gun ship of the line Romulus in an action off Toulon, France. The ship was refitted in Portsmouth from August to December to serve as a flagship in the Mediterranean. Boyne briefly served as the flagship for Admiral Lord Exmouth in 1816. The ship was refitted as a guard ship for duty in the English Channel from July to September 1816. She was reclassified as a 104-gun first rate in February 1817 when the Admiralty revised its rating system and now counted carronades in the gun count. Boyne received a lengthy repair from July 1818 to November 1819. The ship was ordered to be razeed into a 76-gun third rate in July 1826. She was recommissioned in April 1832 and was modified to serve as a gunnery training ship at Portsmouth from October 1833 to March 1834. Boyne was renamed Excellent in November 1834 and then to Queen Charlotte in November 1859. She was paid off a month later and broken up in June 1861.

Union was commissioned in April 1812 and sailed for the Mediterranean the following month. She was paid off in July 1814 and placed in ordinary. The ship was reclassified as per her sister ship in 1817. Union was refitted from November 1819 to January 1820. In 1827 the ship was ordered to be cut down into a two deck, 80-gun, second rate, but this was changed to a 76-gun third rate in late 1832 and was cancelled less than a month later. Union was broken up in March 1833.
