= HMS Boyne (1810) =

Ship of the line of the Royal Navy

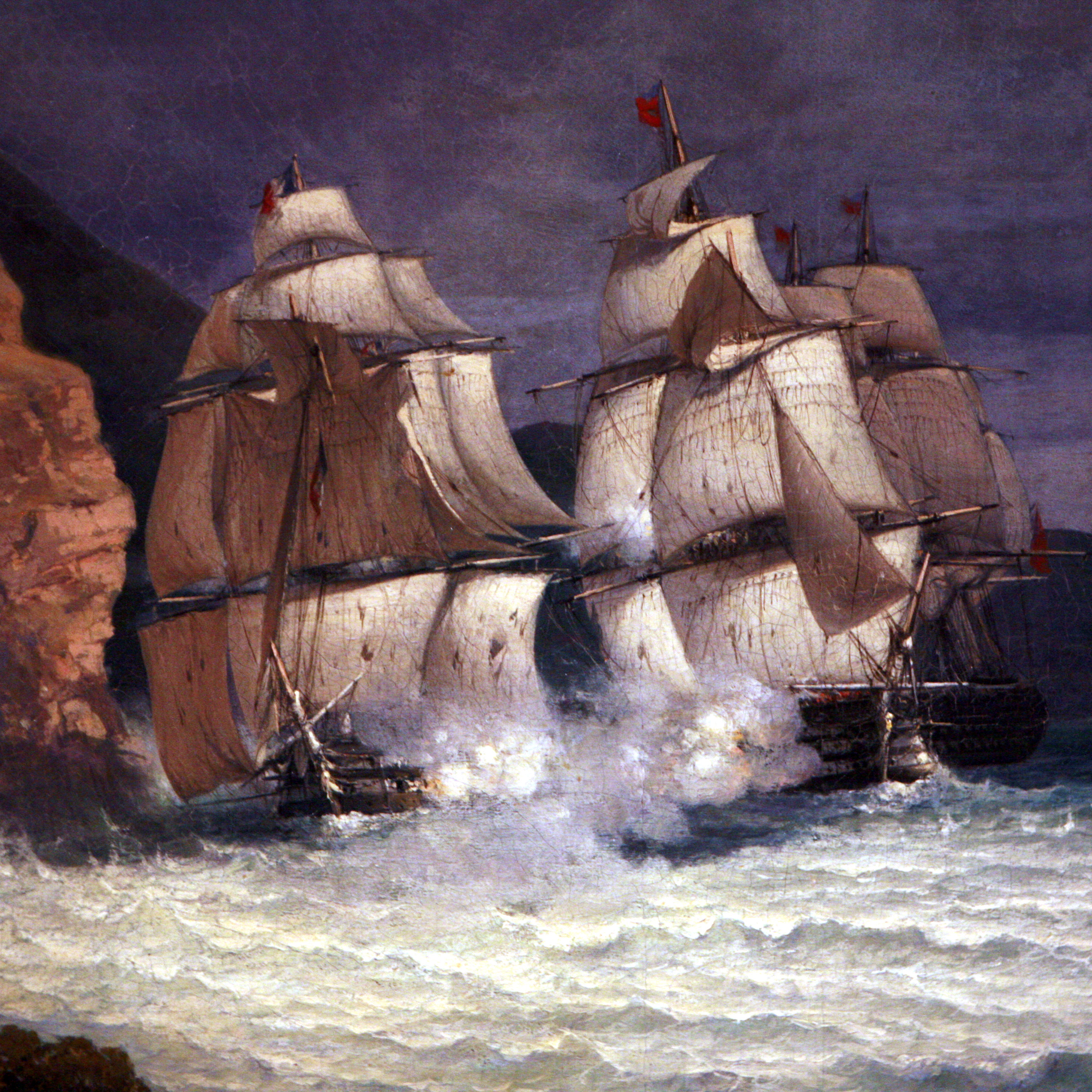
- Fight of the Romulus against HMS Boyne and HMS Caledonia, by Vincent Courdouan (1848)

History

United Kingdom
- Name: HMS Boyne
- Namesake: Battle of the Boyne
- Ordered: 25 June 1801
- Builder: Portsmouth Dockyard
- Laid down: April 1806
- Launched: 3 July 1810
- Renamed: HMS Excellent, 1834
- Fate: Broken up, 1861

General characteristics
- Class & type: Boyne-class ship of the line
- Tons burthen: 2155 bm
- Length: 186 ft (57 m) (gundeck)
- Beam: 51 ft 5 in (15.67 m)
- Depth of hold: 22 ft (6.7 m)
- Propulsion: Sails
- Sail plan: Full-rigged ship
- Complement: 738 (650 razeed)
- Armament: 98 guns: Gundeck: 28 × 32 pdrs; Middle gundeck: 30 × 18 pdrs; Upper gundeck: 30 × 18 pdrs; Quarterdeck: 2 × 18 pdrs, 12 × 32 pdr carronades; Forecastle: 2 × 18 pdrs, 2 × 32 pdr carronades; 76 guns (after being razeed): Gundeck: 26 × 32 pdrs, 2 × 68 pdr carronades; Upper gundeck: 28 × 32 pdrs, 2 × 68 pdr carronades; Quarterdeck: 2 × 18 pdrs, 12 × 32 pdr carronades; Forecastle: 2 × 18 pdrs, 2 × 32 pdr carronades

HMS Boyne was a 98-gun second rate ship of the line of the Royal Navy, built by Nicholas Diddams at Portsmouth Dockyard and launched on 3 July 1810 at Portsmouth. On 12 February 1814 she took part with HMS Caledonia in a hot action against the French line-of-battle ship Romulus off Toulon; the French 74 managed to escape to Toulon by sailing close to the coast to avoid being surrounded. With the 1817 changes to the rating system Boyne was rerated as a 104-gun first rate ship.

On 23 November 1824, Boyne was driven ashore at Portsmouth during a gale. In 1826 she was cut down (razeed) to become a two-deck, 76-gun third-rate ship of the line. On 1 December 1834 she was renamed HMS Excellent and became a training ship. On 22 November 1859 she was renamed HMS Queen Charlotte and paid off the following month before being broken up from December 1861.

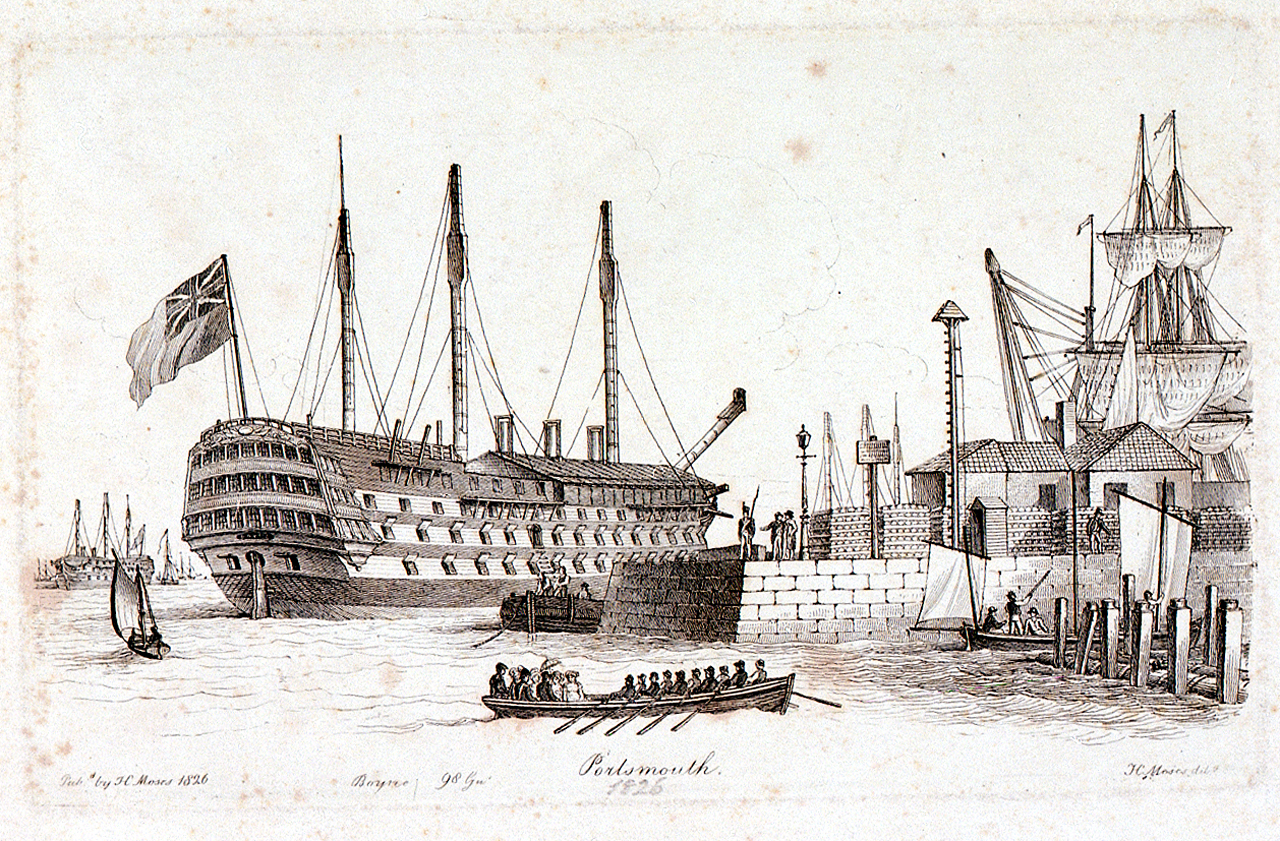
Boyne at Portsmouth 1826
