= Martha Lloyd =

Martha Lloyd may refer to:

- Martha Lloyd, second wife of Francis Austen (1774–1865)
- Martha Lloyd, a fictional character in the Death in Paradise TV series
