= Francis Austen =

Royal Navy officer (1774–1865)

Admiral of the Fleet Sir Francis Austen GCB
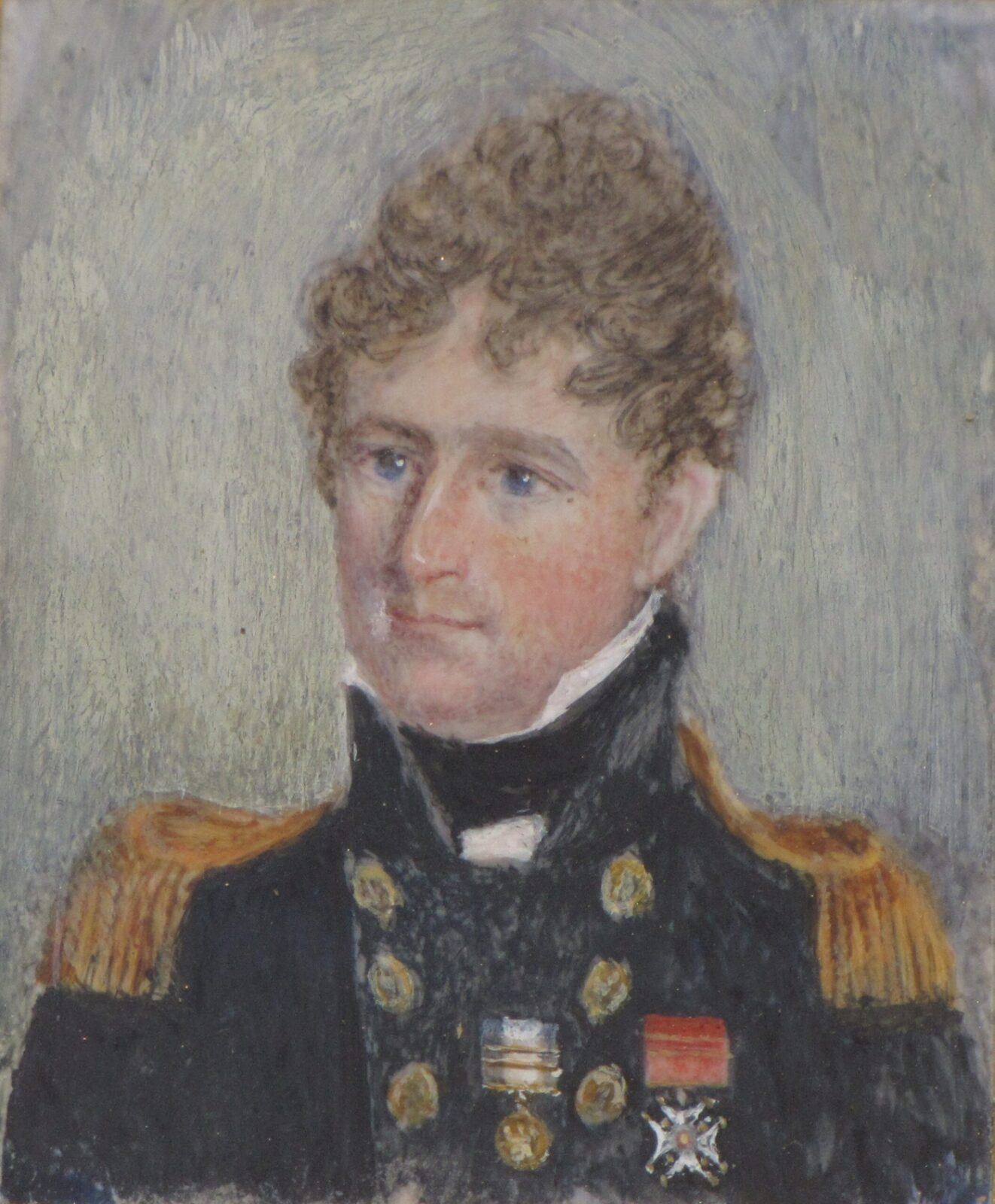
- 1806 portrait
- Born: 23 April 1774; Steventon, Hampshire
- Died: 10 August 1865 (aged 91); Widley, Hampshire
- Burial place: St Peter and St Paul, Wymering, Portsmouth
- Education: Royal Naval Academy
- Spouses: Mary Gibson; Martha Lloyd
- Relatives: George Austen (father); James Austen (brother); Edward Austen Knight (brother); Henry Thomas Austen (brother); Cassandra Austen (sister); Jane Austen (sister); Charles Austen (brother); Philadelphia Austen Hancock (aunt)
- Military career
- Allegiance: Great Britain; United Kingdom
- Branch: Royal Navy
- Service years: 1786–1865
- Rank: Admiral of the Fleet
- Commands: HMS Peterel; HMS Neptune; HMS Leopard; HMS Canopus; HMS St Albans; HMS Caledonia; HMS Elephant; North America and West Indies Station
- Conflicts: French Revolutionary Wars; Napoleonic Wars; War of 1812
- Awards: Knight Grand Cross of the Order of the Bath

Admiral of the Fleet Sir Francis William Austen, GCB (23 April 1774 – 10 August 1865) was a Royal Navy officer and an elder brother of the novelist Jane Austen. As commanding officer of the sloop HMS Peterel, he captured some 40 ships, was present at the capture of a French squadron, and led an operation when the French brig Ligurienne was captured and two others were driven ashore off Marseille during the French Revolutionary Wars.

On the outbreak of Napoleonic Wars Austen was appointed to raise and organise a corps of Sea Fencibles at Ramsgate to defend a strip of the Kentish coast. He went on to be commanding officer of the third-rate HMS Canopus, in which he took part in the pursuit of the French Fleet to the West Indies and back and then fought at the Battle of San Domingo, leading the lee line of ships into the battle. He later commanded the third-rate HMS St Albans and observed the Battle of Vimeiro from the deck of his ship before embarking British troops retreating after the Battle of Corunna. He went on to be commanding officer of the third-rate HMS Elephant and captured the American privateer Swordfish during the War of 1812.

As a senior officer Austen served as Commander-in-Chief, North America and West Indies Station.

== Early career ==
Born the son of the Reverend George Austen and Cassandra Austen (the daughter of the Reverend Thomas Leigh), Francis Austen joined the Royal Navy in April 1786. After graduating at the Royal Naval Academy at Portsmouth, he was appointed to the fifth-rate HMS Perseverance on the East Indies Station. Promoted to midshipman in December 1789, he joined the third-rate HMS Crown and then transferred to the fifth-rate HMS Minerva in November 1791. In HMS Minerva he took part in a blockade of the coast of Mysore.

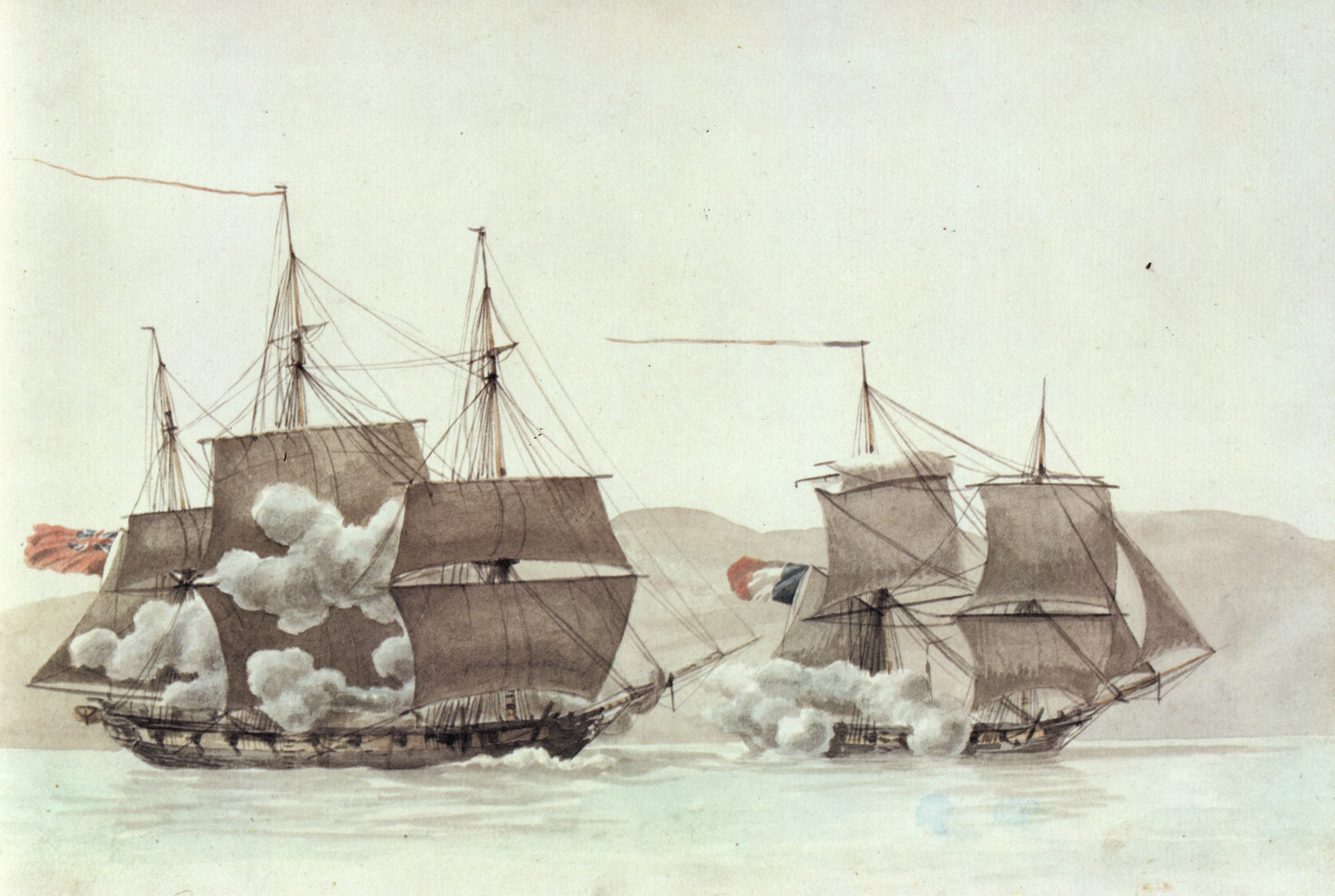
HMS Peterel under Austen capturing Ligurienne on 21 March 1800

Promoted to lieutenant on 28 December 1792, Austen transferred to the sloop HMS Despatch and then returned to England at the end of 1793. In March 1794 he joined the sloop Lark, a brig that was part of a fleet that evacuated British troops from Ostend and Nieuwpoort after the French captured the Netherlands during the French Revolutionary Wars. In March 1795 HMS Lark was part of a squadron that escorted Princess Caroline of Brunswick to England. Austen transferred to the fifth-rate HMS Andromeda in May 1795 and to the second-rate HMS Glory in Autumn 1795. In HMS Glory he escorted the troops of General Ralph Abercromby destined for the West Indies in December 1795. He moved to the fifth-rate HMS Shannon in early 1796, to the fifth-rate HMS Triton in September 1796 and to the fifth-rate HMS Seahorse in March 1797. He then joined the second-rate HMS London in February 1798 and took part in the blockade of Cádiz. After securing the patronage of Admiral Lord Gambier, he was promoted to commander on 3 January 1799 and became commanding officer of the sloop HMS Peterel in February 1799. In Peterel he captured some 40 ships, was present at the capture of a French squadron in June 1799 and led an operation which captured the French brig Ligurienne off Marseille on 21 March 1800. He also took part in the blockade of Genoa in May 1800 and, having been promoted to captain on 13 May 1800, was present at the blockade of Abu Qir in August 1800.

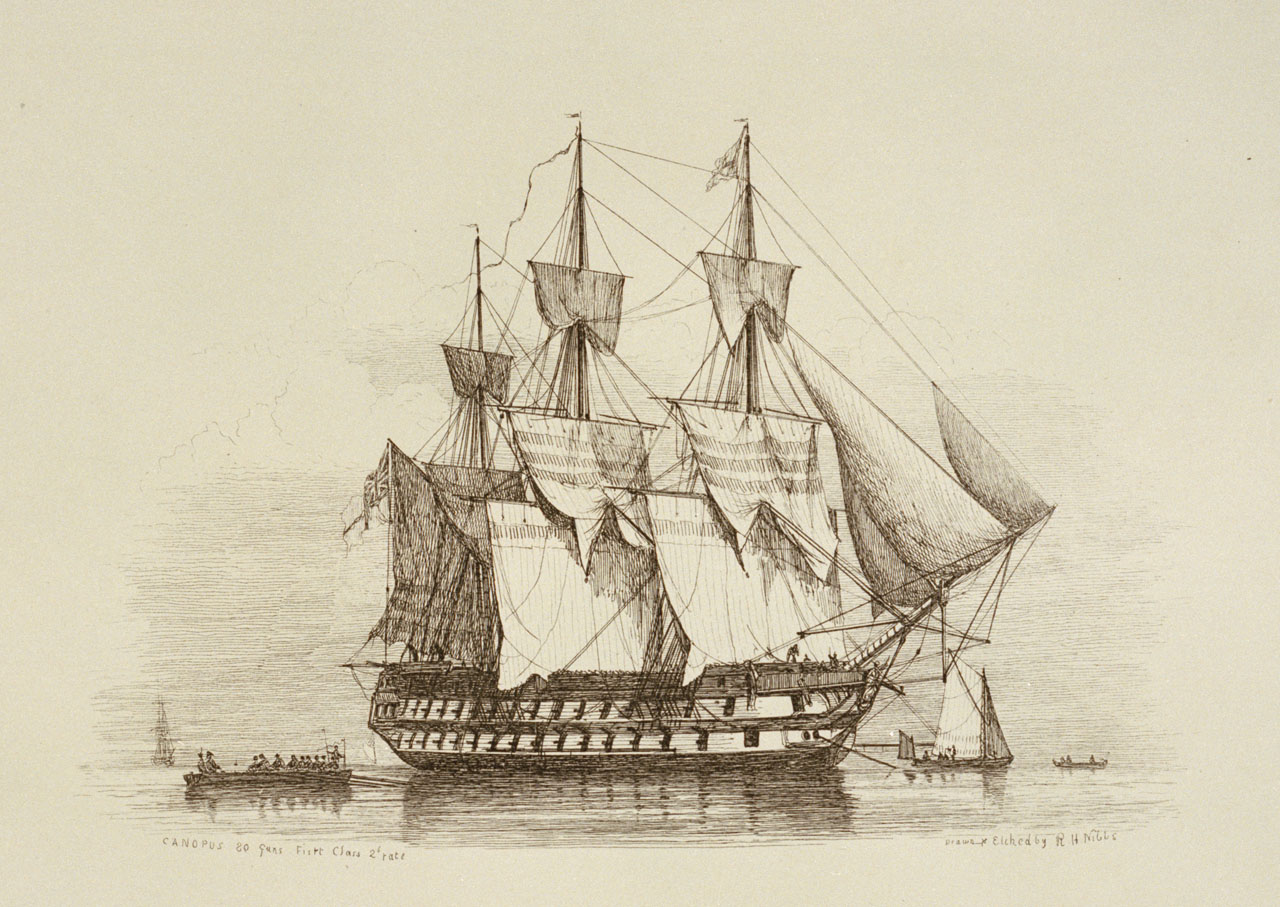
HMS Canopus, which Austen commanded during the pursuit of the French fleet to the West Indies and back

Austen became Flag Captain to Lord Gambier, in the second-rate HMS Neptune in August 1801 and earned a reputation for seeing to the welfare and health of his men. On the outbreak of Napoleonic Wars he was appointed to raise and organise a corps of Sea Fencibles at Ramsgate to defend a strip of the Kentish coast. He went on to be commanding officer of the fourth-rate HMS Leopard, flagship of Rear Admiral Sir Thomas Louis, in May 1804 and then took part in the blockade of Boulogne. He next became commanding officer of the third-rate HMS Canopus, a French ship of the line captured in the Battle of the Nile (as the Franklin), early in 1805. In HMS Canopus he took part in the pursuit of the French Fleet, under the command of Admiral Pierre-Charles Villeneuve, to the West Indies and back in Summer 1805.

Austen was temporarily detached from the fleet for convoy duty in the Mediterranean and missed the Battle of Trafalgar. However, he did command HMS Canopus at the Battle of San Domingo, leading the lee line of ships into the battle, in February 1806. He went on to be commanding officer of the third-rate HMS St Albans in March 1807. On 13 July 1808, the East India Company gave Austen £420 with which to buy a piece of plate: this was a substantial gift (perhaps the equivalent of a year's salary) in thanks for his having safely convoyed to Britain from Saint Helena seven of their Indiamen, plus one extra (voyage chartered) ship. In HMS St Albans he observed the Battle of Vimeiro from the deck of his ship in August 1808 and then embarked British troops retreating after the Battle of Corunna in January 1809.

Austen became Flag Captain to Lord Gambier, Commander-in-Chief of the Channel Squadron, in the first-rate HMS Caledonia in September 1810. He went on to be commanding officer of the third-rate HMS Elephant in the North Sea in 1811 and took part in a blockade of the Scheldt. While in command of Elephant, he captured the American privateer Swordfish in December 1812 during the War of 1812. He was appointed a Companion of the Order of the Bath on 4 June 1815.

== Senior command ==
Promoted to rear admiral on 22 July 1830, Austen was advanced to Knight Commander of the Order of the Bath on 28 February 1837 and promoted to vice admiral on 28 June 1838. He became Commander-in-Chief, North America and West Indies Station, with his flag in the third-rate HMS Vindictive, in December 1844. His main role was to protect British commercial interests during the Mexican–American War, which broke out in 1846, and to disrupt the activities of slave traders. Promoted to full admiral on 1 August 1848, he was advanced to Knight Grand Cross of the Order of the Bath on 18 May 1860 before being appointed Rear-Admiral of the United Kingdom on 5 June 1862 and then Vice-Admiral of the United Kingdom on 11 December 1862. He was promoted to Admiral of the Fleet on 27 April 1863.

Austen died at his home Portsdown Lodge at Widley in Hampshire on 10 August 1865 and was buried in the churchyard at St Peter and St Paul, Wymering, Portsmouth.

== Family ==
In July 1806 Austen married Mary Gibson (eldest daughter of John Gibson); they had ten children. Following the death of his first wife, he married Martha Lloyd (eldest daughter of the Reverend Nowes Lloyd (son of Reverend John Lloyd and Isabella Lloyd, nee Nowes)) in July 1828; they had no children. Martha's collection of recipes used at Chawton, which were later compiled into A Jane Austen Household Book by Peggy Hickman, David & Charles, Ltd. 1977, and in The Jane Austen Cookbook by Maggie Black and Deirdre Le Faye, British Museum Press, 1995; (ISBN 0-7141-2769-8). Martha Lloyd is directly mentioned in Jane Austen's poem, Oh! Mr. Best You're Very Bad.

Austen's siblings included Jane Austen, the novelist, Cassandra Austen, the watercolor painter, and Charles Austen, a naval officer. In an 1808 letter written to his family, Austen expressed anti-slavery sentiments, writing that "slavery however it may be modified is still slavery, and it is much to be regretted that any trace of it should be found to exist in countries dependent on England, or colonized by her subjects".

== Sources ==
- Heathcote, Tony (2002). The British Admirals of the Fleet 1734 – 1995. Pen & Sword. ISBN 0-85052-835-6.
- Le Faye, Deirdre (2006). A Chronology of Jane Austen and her Family: 1700-2000. Cambridge University Press. ISBN 978-0521810647.
- Poplawski, Paul (1998). A Jane Austen Encyclopedia. Westport: Greenwood. ISBN 978-0313300172.

Military offices
Preceded by Sir Charles Adam	Commander-in-Chief, North America and West Indies Station; 1844–1848	Succeeded by Sir Thomas Cochrane
Honorary titles
Preceded by Sir Graham Eden Hamond, Bt	Rear-Admiral of the United Kingdom; 1862	Succeeded by Sir William Parker, Bt
Preceded by Sir Graham Eden Hamond, Bt	Vice-Admiral of the United Kingdom; 1862–1863	Succeeded by Sir Thomas Cochrane
