= HMS Vincejo =

Brig of the Royal Navy

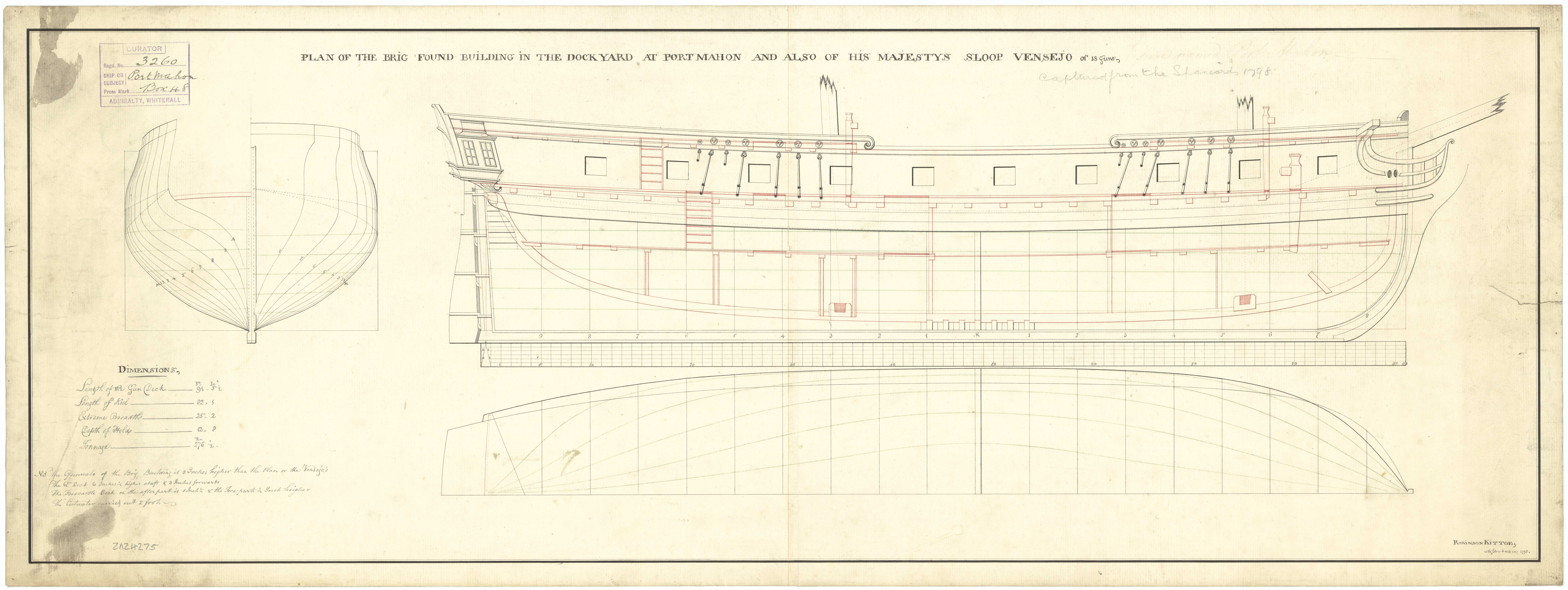
- The body plan, and sheer lines with inboard detail and longitudinal half-breadth for Port Mahon (captured 1798), an 18-gun brig sloop found building at Port Mahon when the port was taken. The plan also relates to Vincejo (Vensejo) (captured 1799), a Spanish 18-gun brig sloop. There are some differences in gunwale heights between the two brigs. The plan is signed by Robinson Kittoe as 'acting Storekeeper 1798' at Mahon.

History

Spain
- Name: Vencejo
- Builder: Port Mahon (probably)
- Launched: c.1797
- Captured: 19 March 1799

Great Britain
- Name: HMS Vincejo
- Acquired: 19 March 1799 by capture
- Nickname(s): Vincey Joe
- Captured: 8 May 1804

France
- Name: Victorine
- Acquired: 8 May 1804 by capture
- Fate: Sold 1805

France
- Name: Comte de Regnaud (or Comte de Reginaud)
- Acquired: By purchase circa or post January 1805
- Captured: 30 November 1811

General characteristics
- Displacement: 290 tons
- Tons burthen: 276 50/94 bm
- Length: 91 ft 5 1/2 in (27.9 m) (overall); 82 ft 1 in (25.0 m) (keel)
- Beam: 25 ft 2 in (7.7 m)
- Depth of hold: 12 ft 8 in (3.9 m)
- Sail plan: Brig
- Complement: Spanish service: 144 men; British service:95 men
- Armament: Spanish service: Gun deck: 18 × 6-pounder guns (gun deck); QD: 6 × brass 4-pounder guns; Fc: 2 × brass 4-guns; British service: 16 × 18-pounder carronades + 2 × 6-pounder bow chasers; French service: 10 × 18-pounder carronades + 4 × 9-pounder guns

HMS Vincejo (or Vencejo or Vencego, or informally as Vincey Joe), was the Spanish naval brig Vencejo, which was built c.1797, probably at Port Mahon, and that the British captured in 1799. The Royal Navy took her into service and she served in the Mediterranean where she captured a privateer and a French naval brig during the French Revolutionary Wars. After the start of the Napoleonic Wars, the French captured Vencejo in Quiberon Bay in 1804. The French Navy took her into service as Victorine, but then sold her in January 1805. She then served as the French privateer Comte de Regnaud until the British recaptured her in 1810. The Royal Navy did not take her back into service.

== Origin and capture ==
The Spanish built Vencejo as a quarterdecked and forecastled brig, possibly around 1797, and probably in Port Mahon. Cormorant captured her on 19 March 1799. Cormorant was in the Mediterranean proceeding to a rendezvous with Centaur when she sighted a brig. After a chase of four hours, Cormorant succeeded in capturing Vincejo. Vincejo was armed with eighteen 6-pounder guns on her gun deck, six brass 4-pounders on her quarterdeck, and two on her forecastle. She also had a crew of 144 men. During the chase Vincejo had thrown six of her 6-pounder guns overboard.

== British service ==
=== French Revolutionary Wars ===
Commander George Long commissioned Vincejo in November. However, she had long since already started to serve with the Royal Navy.

In the action of 18 June 1799, a French frigate squadron under Rear-admiral Perrée, which had escaped Alexandria on 17 March and was now returning to Toulon from Syria, met a 30-ship British fleet under Lord Keith. Three ships of the line and two frigates detached from the British squadron, and a 28-hour running battle ensued. When the British ships overhauled them, the French frigates Junon, Courageuse, and Alceste, and the brigs Salamine and Alerte had no choice but to surrender, given their opponents' overwhelming strength. Vincejo was part of Kieth's fleet and shared in the prize money. A few days later, on 25 June, Vincejo sailed close enough to shore near Genoa that shore batteries fired on her; they ceased firing when she hoisted Spanish colours.

In the latter part of 1799, Keith detached a squadron of four vessels, one being Vincejo, under the command of Captain George Cockburn in Minerve. The squadron's task was to patrol the bay of Genoa to cut communication between Italy and France.

During this time Vincejo came to intercept, after a long chase and a warning shot, a large (6-700 ton (bm)) vessel. She turned out to be the Hercules, of Boston, and hence neutral, with no apparent cargo. The American captain explained to Long that Hercules had taken cargo to Leghorn, sold it there, and then had agreed to take a small number of invalid French officers to a French port where he might find a return cargo for the United States. Long was suspicious and ordered Hercules to accompany him overnight in Long's hope that they might encounter Cockburn and that he would decide what to do with the American vessel. Next day, when it turned out that Minerve was nowhere in sight, Long released the American vessel, which sailed off to Nice. Later, the British learned that Hercules had been ballasted with brass guns (violating her neutrality), and had hidden aboard her French plunder in the form of statues, pictures, plate, and the like. (Note: It is not clear that had the British taken the Hercules that they would have been awarded the plundered goods. They might well have received only a salvage award, but that, even if shared among the vessels of the squadron, would still have been a worthwhile sum.)

On 1 August boats from Minerve and Peterel cut out two vessels from the Bay of Diano, near Genoa. One was a large settee carrying wine, and the other was the French warship Virginie, which was a Turkish-built half-galley of 26 oars, six guns and 36 men, that the French had captured at Malta the year before. Minerve and Peterel shared the proceeds of the capture of Virginie with Santa Teresa and Vincejo.

On 17 October Admiral Nelson ordered Long to take Vincejo on a fortnight's cruise off Toulon and the Îles d'Hyères. One month later, on 16 November, Vincejo communicated with Nelson at Palermo that six French vessels (two Venetian ships armed en flute, two frigates, and two corvettes) had left Toulon. Long believed that they were sailing to Malta to reinforce the French there and so he was sailing there too to warn the Marquise of Niza, the commander of the Portuguese squadron that Nelson had sent to Valletta to initiate a blockade.

In December, Vincejo captured a French vessel carrying a General Voix and 75 officers, mostly members of Napoleon's staff, on their way back to France from Egypt. Long was able to retrieve the dispatches the French had thrown overboard as they had failed to weight them adequately.

On 8 February 1800, Vincejo left Port Mahon as escort to a transport that was carrying to Malta a surgeon's mate and some medical stores that General Henry Edward Fox, lieutenant-governor of Menorca, had provided. The British forces besieging Valletta, especially the Royal Marines and the 89th Regiment of Foot, were suffering from fever, probably typhus.

In late February and early March Vencejo was still off Valletta. Then on 10 March Nelson put the squadron off Valletta, including Vincejo, under the command of Captain Troubridge in Foudroyant.

In the action of 31 March 1800, a British squadron consisting of the ships of the line Foudroyant and Lion, frigate Penelope, brigs Minorca and Vincejo, and bomb vessel Strombolo captured the French ship of the line Guillaume Tell. Although all six vessels of the British squadron shared the prize money, only the two ships of the line and the frigate actually engaged in the battle.

Northumberland, Alexander, Penelope, Bonne Citoyenne, and Vincejo shared in the proceeds of the French polacca Vengeance, captured entering Valletta, Malta on 6 April.

On 25 June, Success captured the French aviso Intreprenante (or Entreprenante). The next day Success captured another aviso, Redoutable, with the same armament, establishment, and mission as Intreprenante. Unfortunately for Success, she had to share the prize money with a large number of other British warships, including Vincejo. (Note: A first-class share of the headmoney was £4 11s 2d; a fifth-class share was worth 6d. Because Success and Vincejo, among others, had been overpaid on the prize money for the two French vessels' hulls and cargoes, £2 13s 8d for a first-class share and 3d for a fifth-class share were deducted from this payment.)

On 1 August Vincejo captured the French naval ketch Etoile, of six guns and 60 men, which was sailing from Toulon to Malta with provisions for the French forces there. French records describe Etoile as an aviso, and give the name of her captain as enseigne de vaisseau auxiliaire Reynaud and the place of capture as off Cap Bon.

The French frigates Diane (or Dianne) and Justice escaped from Valletta Harbour on 24 August. Success, Northumberland, and Genereux captured Diane, which the British took into service as HMS Niobe, but Justice escaped. As part of the blockading squadron, Vincejo shared in the prize money for Diane. (Note: The British captured Justice at the fall of Alexandria on 2 September 1801; in the division of the spoils, the Ottoman navy received Justice.)

On 17 April 1801 Vincenjo captured the privateer Superbe. Then one month later, on 15 or 17 May, Vincejo captured the privateer Serpente. (Note: Winfield has Vincejo capturing Surprise on 17 April 1800, but there is no record of this in the London Gazette. It is quite possible that Superbe, Serpente, and Surprise are all the same vessel, with a capture occurring on 17 April 1801, with confusion developing in the various records.) Vencejo was also among the vessels of the British squadron that shared in the proceeds of the capture of the St. Nicbola on 15 September. (Note: A petty officer's share was worth 10s 7d; an able seaman's share was worth 1s 11d.)

Vincejo was part of the British squadron supporting the Anglo-Tuscan forces at the Siege of Porto Ferrajo when the French attempted to force the surrender of the Tuscan fortress town of Porto Ferrajo (now Portoferraio) on the island of Elba following the French occupation of mainland Tuscany earlier in 1801. The British went on the offensive on 14 September. They assembled a force of some 449 Royal Marines, 240 seamen, and some 300 Tuscan auxiliaries to attack the French batteries that overlooked the mouth of the harbour. Renown, Gibraltar, Dragon, Alexander, Genereux, Stately, Pomone, Pearl and Vincejo, contributed the marines and seamen, all under the command of Captain George Long and Captain John Chambers White of Renown. The British-Tuscan force succeeded in destroying the batteries, though Long was killed in the attack on one. However, eventually the French, who greatly outnumbered the attackers, were able to force them to withdraw. In March 1802 under Article XI of the final terms of the Treaty of Amiens the British turned over the entire island to the French and Elba remained in French hands throughout the Napoleonic Wars.

On 2 October Pomone, Vincejo, the cutter Pigmy, in company with the privateer Furioso, captured the Belle Aurora. In April 1802 Commander James Prevost took command of Vincejo.

Vincejo arrived at Sheerness on 6 April 1803. Admiralty records show that she then underwent refitting at Chatham between September 1803 and February 1804, with Commander John Wesley Wright recommissioning her in September 1803.

=== Napoleonic Wars and capture ===
However, Wright was already in command of Vincejo in August, and carrying out secret missions on the French coast. On the night of 23 August 1803, Vincejo landed Georges Cadoudal and several other Chouans, possibly including Jean-Charles Pichegru, at the foot of the cliffs of Biville. The Chouans were royalists and intended to attempt the assassination or overthrow of Napoleon. (Note: The French government arrested Pichegru on 28 February 1804, and he was later found strangled in prison. The government reported that he had committed suicide, but the report was widely thought to be false.)

Vincejo continued to patrol the coast between the Loire and Lorient, seeking to capture coastal shipping. At night, she made other forays to liaise with the royalists. On 15 March 1804, Vincejo captured the Delphini.

Between 28 April and 4 May Vincejo chased several large French convoys into the Vilaine estuary, the Gulf of Morbihan, Crac, and Lorient. The weak and inconstant winds meant that her efforts had little effect beyond interrupting his quarries' journeys. Then on the evening of 4 May Wright sighted a large ship corvette, of 18 guns, at the entrance to Lorient. Over the next three days he attempted to intercept her and lure her out to where he could engage her. In the meantime, he forced a convoy to take shelter at Le Palais, Belle Île.

On 7 May, while trying to lure the corvette towards Belle Île Vincejo drove a sloop ashore between Saint-Gildas and Saint-Jacques. In the morning of 8 May Vincejo found herself becalmed while the tide carried her towards the Teigneuse Rock. As Wright was attempting to warp her out to the channel, he observed that a flotilla of gunboats had come out from the Morbihan and was approaching Vincejo. The gunboats started firing as soon as they were in range and continued firing as they approached. Vincejo' crew alternated between manning the larboard guns and the starboard sweeps, leaving them exhausted.

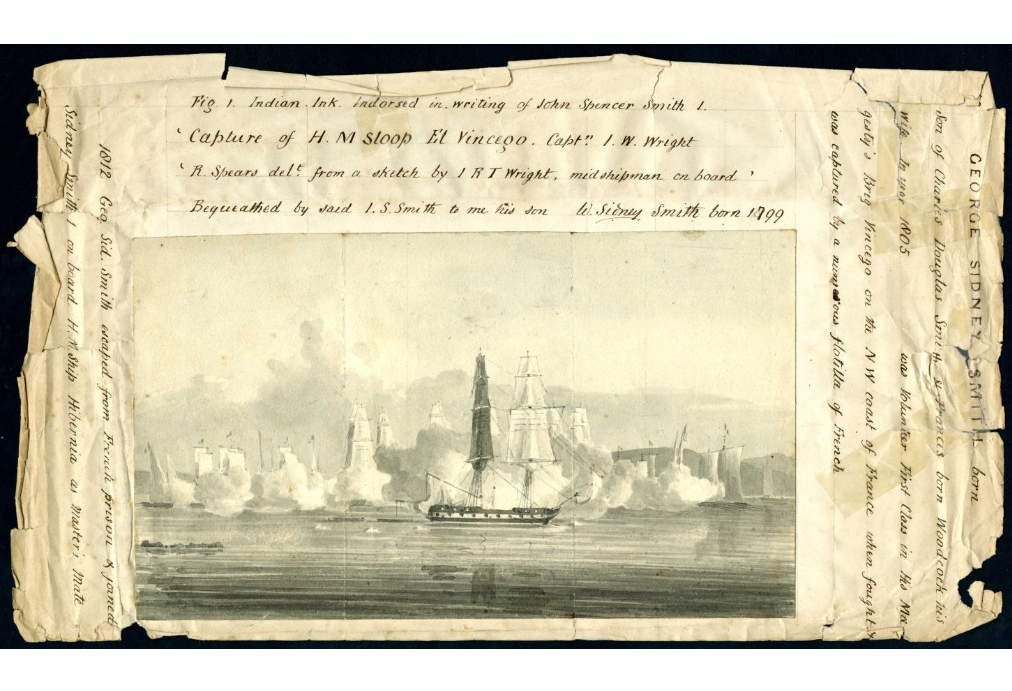
Capture of the H. M. Sloop El Vincego, 1804.

The French gunvessels stood off at a distance such that although their guns could reach Vincejo, her carronades could not reach them. After two hours of unequal combat, Wright struck Vincejo's colours. Her rigging was gone, her sails, riddled, and three guns were dismounted. She had suffered two men killed and 12 wounded. Wright wrote that he had surrendered "to preserve the lives of my brave men for some better occasion."

The French imprisoned the crew and took Wright to Paris where they imprisoned him in the Temple prison, where he had spent April 1796 to May 1798 as a prisoner while functioning as secretary to Sir Sidney Smith. Now the French interrogated Wright about what he knew of the royalists and their plans, and particularly about Georges and Pichegru. In 1805 Wright died, reportedly a suicide; British opinion was that he had been murdered.

In 1813, Lieutenant James Wallis, who had been senior lieutenant on Vincejo, escaped to Great Britain. He brought with him a letter dated 14 May 1804, that constituted Wright's official report of the loss. In his report, in addition to the casualties, Wright described 26 men as being unfit for service, without specifying what that entailed. He described the 17 gun-vessels that had captured him as consisting of six brigs each armed with three 18 and 24-pounder guns and having crews of 60 to 80 men, six cutters each armed with two 18 and 24-pounder guns and having crews of some 50 to 40 men, and five luggers each armed with one carronade or shell-firing howitzer and having a crew of 30 men. Wallis received promotion to Commander and in August 1814 command of Podargus.

== Privateer and capture ==
The French Navy took Vincejo into service as Victorine. However, the Navy sold her at Lorient in January 1805.

In 1809, the merchants Gareshé frères, Garreau et Filleau at Lorient equipped Compte de Regnaud, ex-Victorine, for an "expedition de aventure" to Isle de France (Mauritius).

On 30 November 1811, Rover captured the letter-of-marque Comte Regnaud. Comte Regnaud was armed with ten 18-pounder carronades and four 9-pounder guns. She was under the command of M. Abraham Giscard and had left Batavia on 7 August 1811 with a cargo of spices, sugar, and coffee, the greater part of which belonged to the French government, and which cargo she was taking to Rochelle. She turned out to be the former Vincejo. Although Commander Justice Finley, Rover's captain, described her as "well found in every Respect, and sails remarkably well", the Royal Navy did not take her back into service. Prize money was paid in January 1813.
