= French brig Ligurienne =

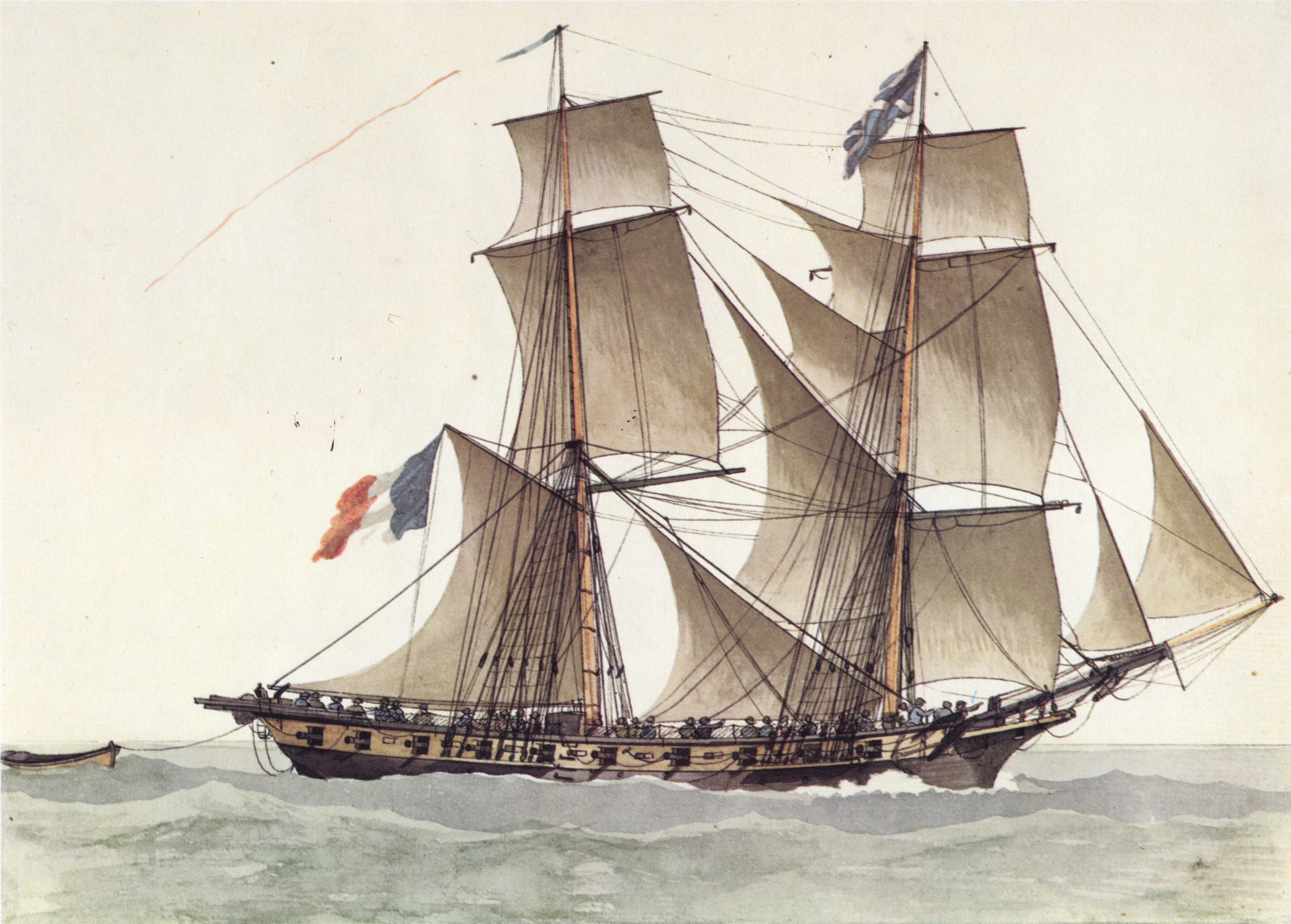
- Painting of Ligurienne by Antoine Roux

History

France
- Name: Ligurienne
- Namesake: Liguria
- Builder: Toulon, Builder: Honoré Garnier Saint-Maurice
- Laid down: March 1798
- Launched: 2 May 1798
- In service: July 1798
- Fate: Captured on 21 March 1800

General characteristics
- Class & type: Brig-corvette
- Displacement: 300 tons (French)
- Tons burthen: 150 (French; "of load")
- Length: 26 metres (85 ft)
- Beam: 7 metres (23 ft 0 in)
- Draught: 3 metres (9.8 ft)
- Complement: 104
- Armament: French account: 1 × 12-pounder gun + 6 × 6-pounder guns; British account: 14 × 6-pounder guns + 2 × 36-pounder obusiers

Ligurienne was a 16-gun sectional brig of the French Navy that was launched in 1798. The British captured her in 1800, but did not take her into service.

== Design ==
Garnier designed Ligurienne to plans by François-Frédéric Poncet, following the design specifications of General Napoleon Bonaparte. What Napoleon wanted was a ship whose hull could be split into eight sections, joined by screw bolts so that she could be dismantled, carried in 10 wagons over land, and then be re-assembled on reaching water again. This would permit the French to transfer the ship from the Mediterranean to the Red Sea, there being no Suez Canal at the time. She had 16 gun-ports, and seven small ports for oars.

== Career ==
On 21 March 1800, HMS Peterel and HMS Mermaid captured Ligurienne while she was off Marseilles escorting a convoy from Cette to Toulon. Ligurienne was under the command of Lieutenant de vaisseau François Auguste Pelabon.

Her consorts, the demi-chébecs Cerf and Lejoille, ran aground; Ligurienne resisted until 6pm before striking her colours. The French apparently were able later to refloat Cerf and Lejoille.

== British account ==
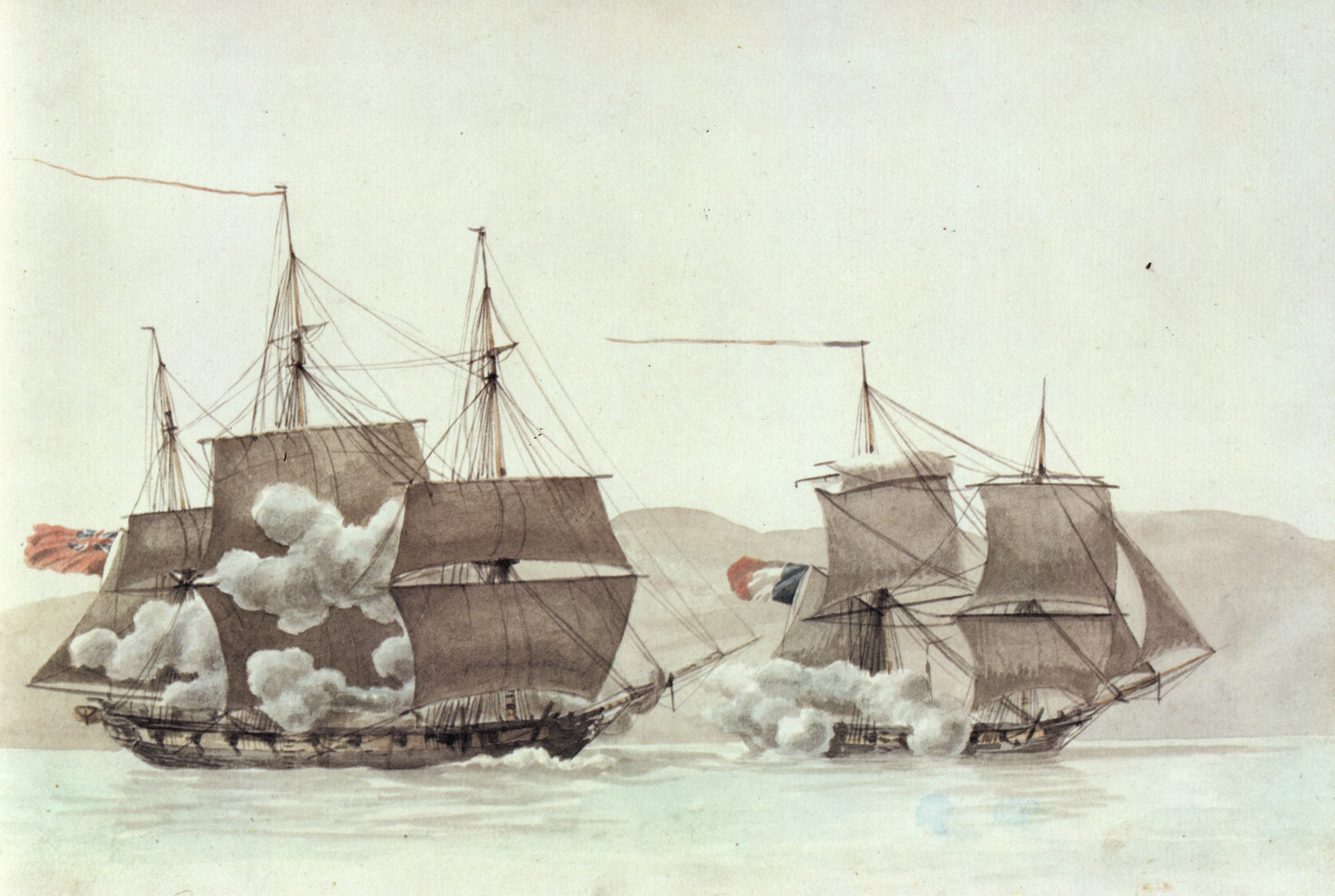
HMS Peterel (left) capturing Ligurienne on 21 March 1800

Peterel, under the command of Commander Francis Austen, was sailing off Marseille with the frigate HMS Mermaid. On 21 March 1800, Peterel spotted a large French convoy with three escorts: the brig-sloop Ligurienne, armed with 14 brass 6-pounder guns and two brass 36-pounder obusier de vaisseaus, the corvette Cerf, of fourteen 6-pounder guns, and the xebec Lejoille, of six 6-pounder guns. Peterel captured a bark of 350 tons and a bombarde (ketch) of 150 tons, both carrying wheat and which their crews had abandoned, and sent them off with prize crews; later that afternoon the escorts caught up to Peterel and attacked. Mermaid was in sight but a great distance to leeward and so unable to assist.

Single-handedly, Peterel drove Cerf and Lejoille on shore, and after a 90-minute battle captured Ligurienne, which lost Pelabon and one sailor killed and two sailors wounded out of her crew of 104 men; there were no British casualties. Some British accounts claim that Cerf was a total loss but that the French were able to salvage Lejoille. The whole action took place under the guns of two shore batteries and so close to shore that Peterel grounded for a few minutes. One month after the action, Austen was promoted to captain. In 1847 the British Admiralty awarded the Naval General Service Medal with clasp "Peterel 21 March 1800" to the two surviving claimants from the action.

== Fate ==
The British sent Ligurienne into Plymouth. Austen recommended, without success, that the Navy purchase Ligurienne, which was less than two years old.
