= Vincent Courdouan =

French painter (1810–1893)

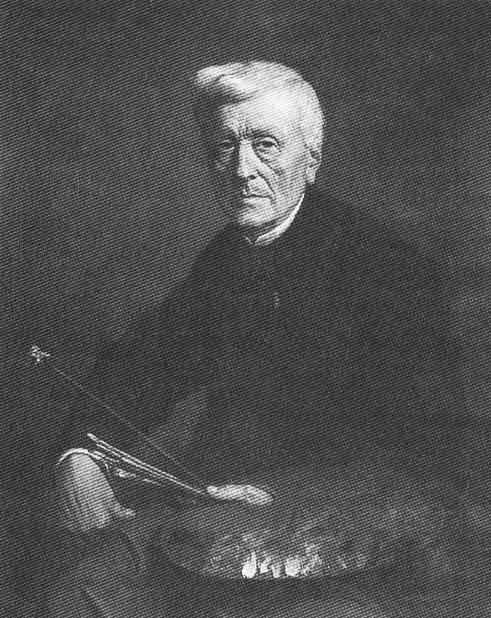
Vincent Courdouan; portrait by Louis Garcin (fl.1860s/80s)

Joseph Vincent François Courdouan (7 March 1810 – 8 December 1893) was a French painter who specialized in marine art.

== Biography ==
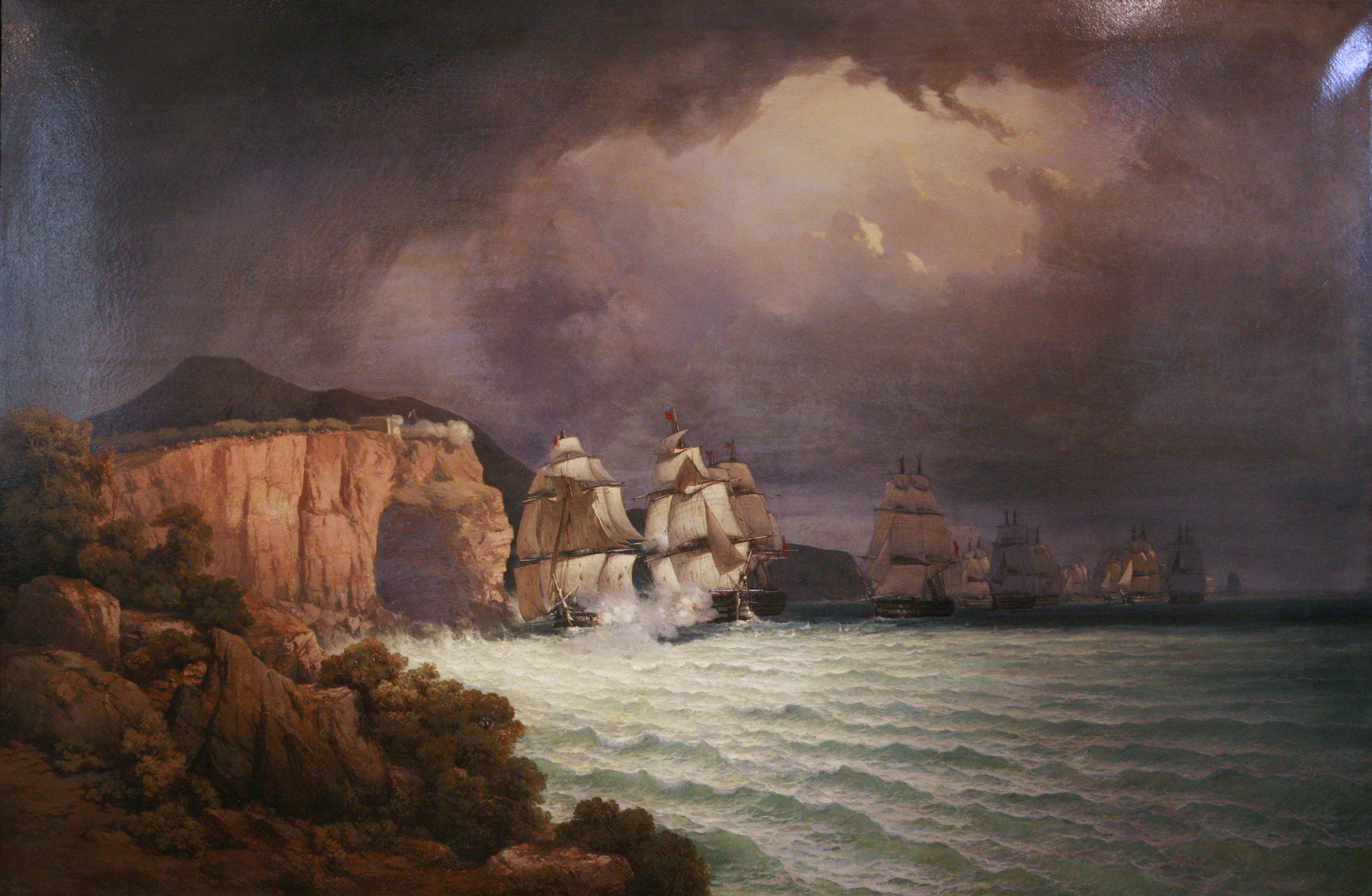
Battle of the Romulus (1848)

His father was a farrier and veterinarian. He began his artistic studies at the age of twelve with the local artist Pierre Letuaire. Later, he spent some time at the "École des Beaux-Arts de la Marine", a small school under the direction of the naval sculptor Jacques-Félix Brun. In 1829, he went to Paris where he studied engraving and worked in the studios of the painter Paulin Guérin, who was also originally from Toulon.

After completing his studies, he returned home and, in 1833, became a member of the Académie du Var, a group that promotes the arts and sciences in that region and can boast of many prominent members; including André-Marie Ampère, Louis Lumière and Georges-Eugène Haussmann. Three years later, he was back in Paris with his first exhibition at the Salon, where he continued to exhibit, winning a Third Class Medal in 1838 for his watercolors and pastels.

=== First successes ===
In 1840, he began accepting students; these included the etcher Charles Meryon. He travelled to Naples in 1844. The following year, he turned more to oil painting and exhibited widely throughout France, notably in Lyon. In 1847, he visited Algeria and achieved a gold medal at the Salon of 1848 for his painting "Battle of the Romulus". This recognition was a major factor in his receiving a Professorship at the "École de la Marine de Toulon" in 1849. Three years later, he was awarded the Légion d’Honneur.

He was named Honorary Director of the Musée d'art de Toulon in 1857 and, five years later, was admitted into the Félibrige (an Occitan cultural association) by its founder, Frédéric Mistral. The following year, at the age of 53, he married one of his students.

He continued to exhibit and travel widely for many years (including a trip to Egypt in 1866). He had his last showing at the Salon in 1883 and his last major exhibitions at Hyères and Aix-en-Provence in 1886. He died in the same house where he had been born.

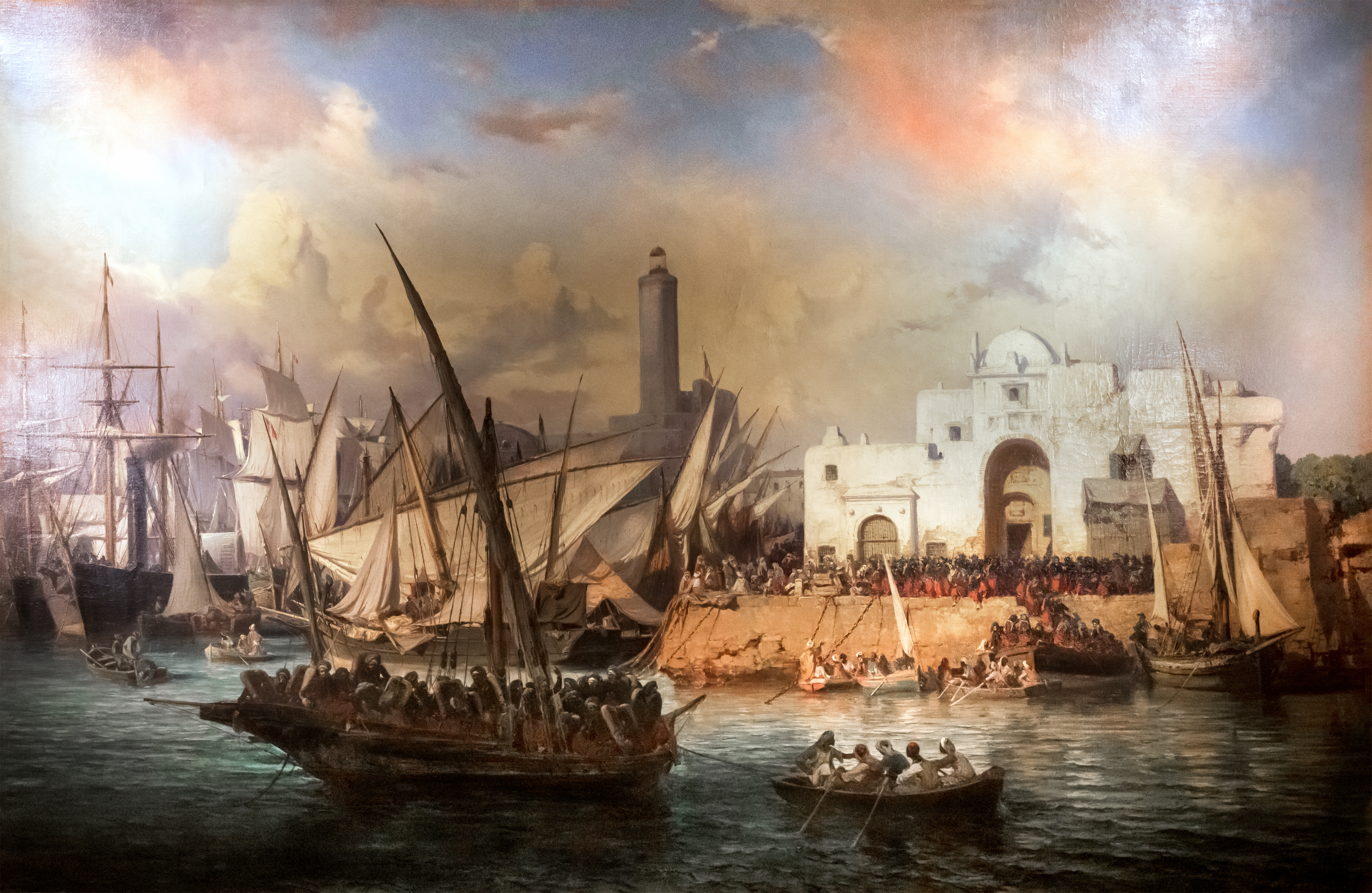
Embarkation of the Zouaves leaving Algiers for the Crimea (1855)
