= HMS Peterel (1794) =

Sloop of the Royal Navy

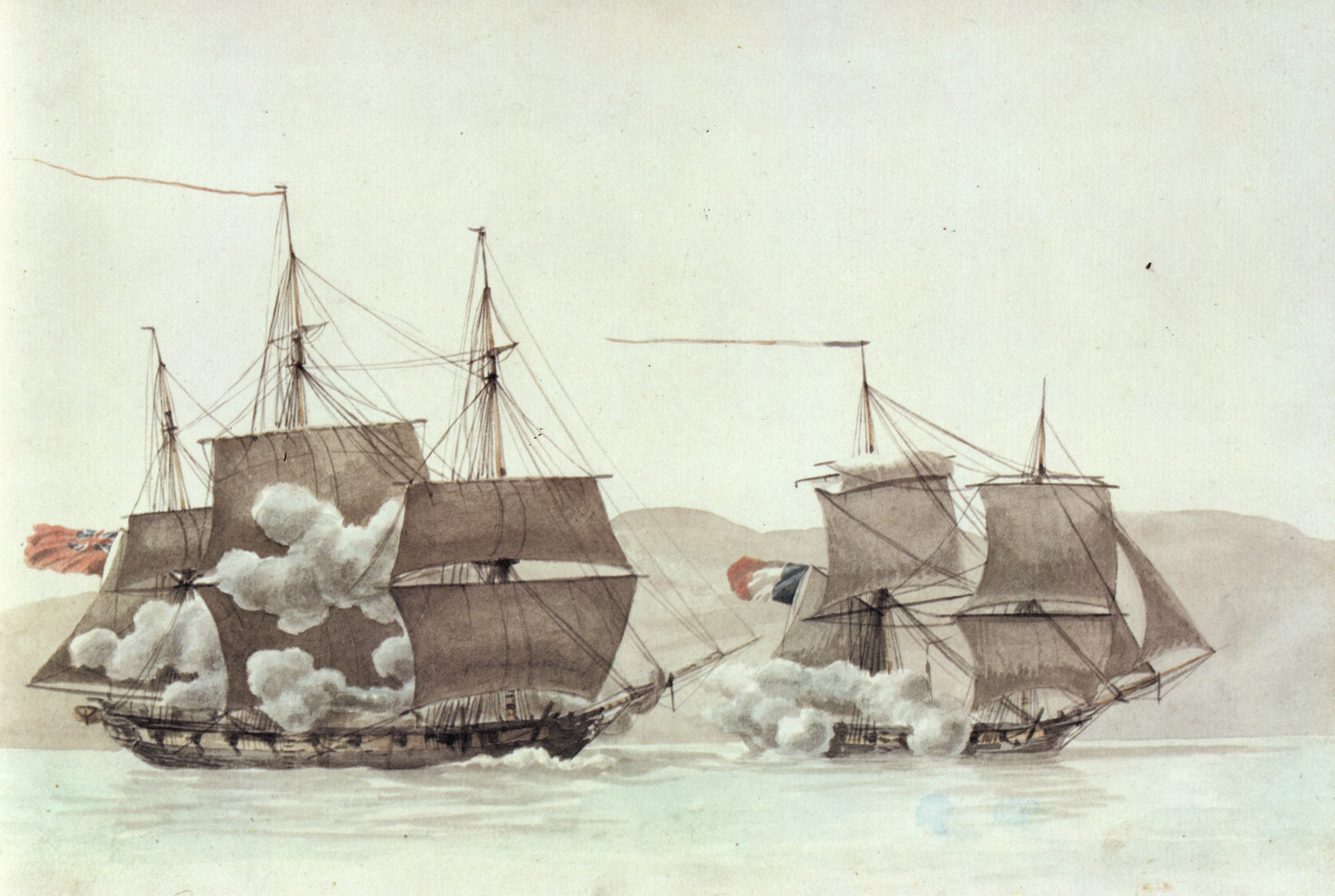
- Peterel (left) capturing Ligurienne on 21 March 1800

History

Great Britain
- Name: HMS Peterel (Note: Henderson, James, Marshall, and Winfield use the spelling Peterel, but Colledge uses the spelling Peterell. Also a survey of primary documents reveals the use of both spellings. The underlying reason is that around 1810, +/- a decade, English spelling for a number of words changed abruptly. Until 1806, notices in the London Gazette used the spelling Peterell; starting in 1805 they used the spelling Peterel.)
- Ordered: 18 February 1793
- Builder: John Wilson, Frindsbury
- Cost: £7,924
- Laid down: May 1793
- Launched: 3 April 1794
- Completed: June 1794
- Honours and awards: Naval General Service Medal with clasps; "Peterel 21 March 1800"; "Egypt"
- Fate: Sold 11 July 1827

General characteristics
- Class & type: 16-gun Pylades-class ship-sloop
- Tons burthen: 36557/94 bm
- Length: 105 ft (32.00 m) (overall)
- Beam: 28 ft (8.5 m)
- Draught: 13 ft 6 in (4.11 m)
- Sail plan: Full-rigged ship
- Complement: 121
- Armament: Initial armament: 16 × 6-pounder guns + 4 × 1/2-pounder swivel guns; Later: Gundeck: 16 × 24-pounder carronades; QD: 6 × 12-pounder carronades; Fc: 2 × 12-pounder carronades

HMS Peterel (or Peterell) was a 16-gun Pylades-class ship-sloop of the Royal Navy. She was launched in 1794 and was decommissioned in 1827. Her most famous action was the capture of the French Navy brig Ligurienne on 21 March 1800 as part of the War of the Second Coalition. During the action, after Peterel captured two French merchant ships and sent them away with prize crews three French warships attacked her. Peterel drove two on shore and captured the largest, the 14-gun Ligurienne. The British navy converted Peterel to a receiving ship at Plymouth in 1811 and sold her in 1827.

== Design and construction ==
Peterel was part of the six-ship Pylades-class of ship-sloops designed by Sir John Henslow. The ship was built by John Wilson & Company of Frindsbury, and measured 36557/94 (bm) with a total length of 105ft 1in. She was initially armed with 16 6-pound guns and 4 ½-pounder swivel guns and carried a complement of 121 men. She was later re-armed with sixteen 24-pounder carronades on the upper deck, with six 12-pounder carronades on the quarterdeck and two 12-pounder carronades on the forecastle. The ship was ordered on 18 February 1793, laid down in May 1793 and launched on 4 April 1794. She moved to Chatham to be fitted-out and have her hull covered with copper plates between 4 April and July 1794; at her completion she had cost £7,694 to build including fitting.

== Service ==
Peterel was commissioned in April 1794 under Commander Stephen Church. In October Commander Edward Leveson-Gower replaced Church, only to be replaced in turn in July 1795 by Commander Charles Ogle. Peterel was at this stage assigned to the squadron in the Downs. Commander John Temple succeeded Ogle in January 1796. By 31 May Peterel had joined Horatio Nelson's squadron patrolling off Genoa. On that day Peterel was part of a small squadron under Nelson in Agamemnon that captured six French vessels that were carrying military supplies from Toulon to St. Piere d'Acena for the siege of Mantua. In July she was under the command of Captain Stuart. Stuart and Peterel directed the landing of troops for the capture of Porto Ferrajo on 10 July.

Commander Bartholomew James took command of Peterel some time after this. He was superseded in command around August, but the officer sent to replace him, Commander Philip Wodehouse, was travelling out from England and spent four months trying to locate Peterel. He finally took command in November. In December Peterel landed a small party under Lieutenant Thomas Staines on the coast of Corsica. The landing party attacked a Martello tower, which they captured, and threw its gun, a long 32-pounder, over the cliff.

Peterel's next captain, Commander William Proby, took over in March 1797. In June 1797 Proby authorised Staines to take 20 men in two of the ship's boats to cut out a French privateer that had been preying on merchant vessels off the coast of Tuscany. After a skirmish in which the British had five men wounded and the French lost several dead and wounded, the British took the privateer, which had a crew of 45 men and was armed with two long guns and several swivels.

By August Commander Thomas Caulfield had replaced Proby. Under Caulfield's command Peterel was involved in the capture of the French privateer Léopard on 30 April 1798. Leopard was armed with twelve 6-pounder guns and 14 swivel guns. She had a crew of 100 men and had been on the prowl for 20 days, but without having captured anything.

At some later stage she was commanded by Lieutenant Adam Drummond, who was followed by Commander Henry Digby. In September 1798, Digby sailed from Gibraltar to Faro, Portugal, to deliver despatches from Earl St. Vincent for the Lisbon packet. Staines took the six men in Peterel's jolly boat to deliver the despatches to the packet when the jolly boat overturned in heavy seas. Four men drowned and Staines and the other man were only rescued after four hours.

Digby's replacement in October that year was to be Commander Hugh Downman, but in November Captain George Long was in command, serving with John Duckworth's squadron at Menorca.

== Capture and recapture ==
Peterel participated in the Capture of Menorca (1798) by the British expedition under Commodore John Duckworth. On 12 November 1798 the Spanish 40-gun frigate Flora, in company with the 40-gun Proserpina and the 34-gun ships Pomona and Casilda, captured Peterel whilst she was operating off Menorca. One of the Spanish ships fired a broadside after she surrendered. After removing the prisoners from the ship, the Spanish plundered their clothes and possessions, murdering a seaman who attempted to defend his property. Duckworth detached Argo to pursue the sloop and on 13 November she retook Peterel and her 72-man Spanish prize crew, which was under the command of Don Antonio Franco Gandrada, Second Captain of Flora. Captain James Bowen of Argo put his own prize crew of 46 officers seamen and marines aboard Peterel. Duckworth later appointed his first lieutenant, George Jones, to command Peterel. Most of the clothes belonging to Captain Long and his officers were subsequently recovered. This charge of ill-usage was officially contradicted in the Madrid Gazette of 12 April, but was, nevertheless, essentially true. (Note: Commander George Long received command of the then newly-captured Spanish brig Vincejo in November 1799. He would die at the siege of Porto Ferrajo in 1801.)

The Spanish squadron, already being chased the next day by several British ships, completely outsailed their pursuers and returned to Cartagena with the prisoners. After a detention of 14 days at Cartagena, Lieutenant Staines and his fellow prisoners were embarked in a merchant brig bound to Málaga; but they did not arrive there until 24 December, a westerly wind having obliged the vessel to anchor off Almeria, where she was detained upwards of three weeks, and her passengers confined on shore during that period. From Málaga, the British were marched to Gibraltar, under a strong escort of soldiers, who treated both officers and men with great brutality, but particularly Lieutenant Staines, who had received a sabre wound in the wrist whilst parrying a blow which one of those soldiers had aimed at his head. On their arrival at the rock, a court-martial was assembled to investigate the circumstances attending their capture by the Spanish squadron; and as no blame could be attached to any individual, the whole of them were sent back to the Peterel immediately after their acquittal.

== Resumed service ==
On 3 February 1799, Francis Austen, the brother of author Jane Austen and future admiral of the fleet, took command of Peterel. Peterel and Austen shared in the proceeds of the capture on 18 June 1799 of the French frigates Courageuse, Alceste, and Junon, and the brigs Alerte and Salamine. Under Austen, Peterel captured or cut out from ports an armed galley, a transport brig carrying cannons and ammunition, and some twenty merchant vessels. In May 1799 Peterel carried the news to Lord Nelson at Palermo, Sicily, that a large enemy fleet had passed through the straits of Gibraltar.

On the evening of 1 August 1799, at 9 P.M., Minerve's boats came alongside Peterel. Austen sent these boats and his own to cut out some vessels from the Bay of Diano, near Genoa. Firing was heard at around midnight and by morning the boats returned, bringing with them a large settee carrying wine, and the Virginie. Virginie was a Turkish-built half-galley that the French had captured at Malta the year before. She had provision for 26 oars and carried six guns. She was under the command of a lieutenant de vaisseau and had a crew of 36 men, 20 of whom had jumped overboard when the British approached, and 16 of whom the British captured. She had brought General Joubert from Toulon and was going on the next day to Genoa where Joubert was to replace General Moreau in command of the French army in Italy. Minerve and Peterel shared the proceeds of the capture of Virginie with Santa Teresa and Vincejo.

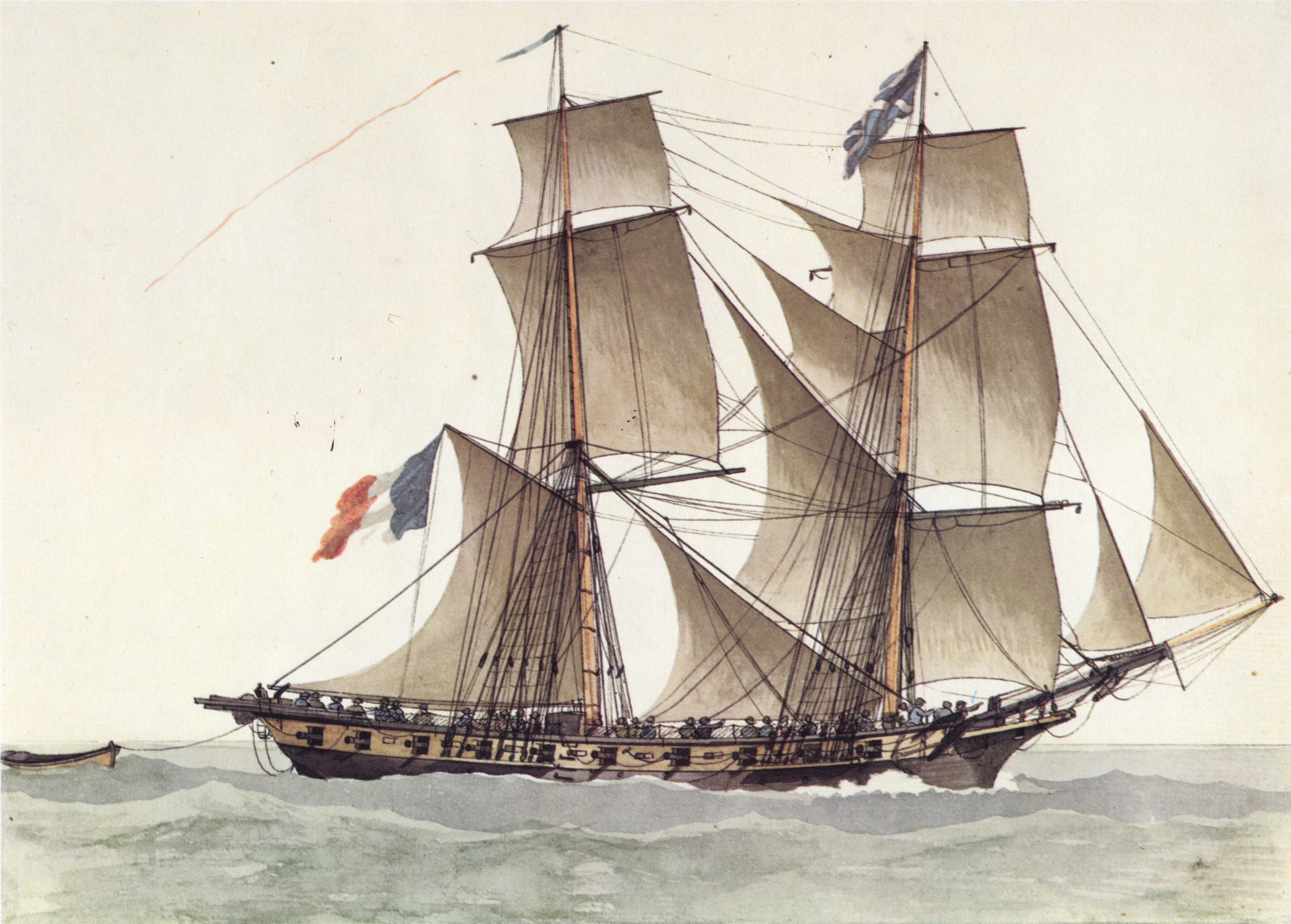
Ligurienne under way.

In March 1800, Peterel was sailing near Marseille with the frigate HMS Mermaid. On 21 March, Peterel spotted a large convoy with three escorts: the brig-sloop French brig Ligurienne, armed with fourteen brass 6-pounder guns and two brass 36-pounder howitzers, the corvette Cerf, of fourteen 6-pounder guns, and the xebec Lejoille, of six 6-pounder guns. Peterel captured a bark of 350 tons and a bombarde (ketch) of 150 tons, both carrying wheat and which their crews had abandoned, and sent them off with prize crews; later that afternoon the escorts caught up to Peterel and attacked. Mermaid was in sight but a great distance to leeward and so unable to assist. Single-handedly, Peterel drove Cerf and Lejoille on shore, and after a 90-minute battle captured Ligurienne, which lost the French commander (lieutenant de vaisseaux Citoyen Francis Auguste Pelabon), and one sailor killed and two sailors wounded out of her crew of 104 men; there were no British casualties. Cerf was a total loss but the French were able to salvage Lejoille. The whole action took place under the guns of two shore batteries and so close to shore that Peterel grounded for a few minutes. Austen recommended, without success, that the Navy purchase Ligurienne, which was less than two years old. In 1847 the Admiralty authorised the issue of the Naval General Service medal with clasp "Peterel 21 March 1800" to all surviving claimants from the action.

On 14 April 1800, Peterel and Phaeton captured St. Rosalia.

Peterel went on to take part in operations against the French forces in Egypt. On 13 August 1800, Peterel was sailing towards Alexandria when she spied a Turkish 80-gun ship of the line totally dismasted and aground near Aboukir Bay, with three Turkish frigates standing offshore, out of range of any French guns on shore. Some of the Turkish crew of the ship of the line had reached the frigates, but the captain and most of the crew had surrendered to the French. Austen sent in a pinnace and ten men who set fire to the Turkish ship to forestall any further French attempts to plunder it, especially of its guns and ammunition. Commander Charles Inglis officially replaced Austen in June 1800, but apparently did not actually take command until some months later.

On 8 March 1801, Peterel, Cameleon, and another sloop supported the British landing at Abu Qir Bay by stationing themselves close in with their broadsides towards the shore.

Peterel and Victorieuse drove a Greek caicque onshore on 11 March at Tower of Arabs. The vessel was on her way to Alexandria.

Because Peterel served in the navy's Egyptian campaign (8 March to 2 September 1801), her officers and crew qualified for the clasp "Egypt" to the Naval General Service Medal that the Admiralty authorized in 1850 for all surviving claimants. (Note: A first-class share of the prize money awarded in April 1823 was worth £34 2s 4d; a fifth-class share, that of a seaman, was worth 3s 11½d. The amount was small as the total had to be shared between 79 vessels and the entire army contingent.)

In July–August 1802, Peterel was part of a small anti-smuggling squadron under the command of Captain King, of Sirius. who further had command of a small squadron on anti-smuggling duties. The other vessels in the squadron were Carysfort, Imogen, and Rosario.

== Napoleonic Wars ==
From 29 April 1802 until 1809 Peterel was under Commander John Lamborn. In May 1804, she sailed for Jamaica and Barbados, convoying the West Indies trade, and thereafter remained in the West Indies for some years. She destroyed a small privateer on the Jamaica station on 23 January 1805. The privateer was a felucca, armed with one 4-pounder gun and a swivel gun. She had a crew of 27 men, all except one of whom escaped after they ran her on shore and before Peterel's boats arrived to burn her. (Note: A first-class share of the prize money was worth £36 8s 11¼d; a fifth-class share, that of a seaman, was worth 5s 2d.) The privateer had captured an American brig which she had sent into Havana where the brig was sold.

On 8 February, Pique captured the Spanish warship Urquixo, of 18 guns and 82 men. Peterel shared in the proceeds.

On 13 May Peterell captured the Spanish privateer schooner Santa Anna off Cuba. Santa Anna was armed with one long 18-pounder gun and four 6-pounder guns, and had a crew of 106 men. She had sailed from Santiago de Cuba only the day before and had not yet captured anything. At some point in 1805 or 1806, Peterel captured the ship Hoffnung, in sight of the armed schooner Arab, Lieutenant Carpenter, commander.

In early October 1806, Peterel was part of a convoy from Jamaica. Near North Edisto she encountered the French privateer Superbe, of 14 guns and 150 men. The privateer mistook Peterel for a guineaman and attempted to board. Peterel repulsed the attempt and then gave chase as Captain Dominique Houx (or Diron) of Superbe realized his mistake and made his escape. In the skirmish, Lieutenant Maitland of Peterel was killed, and four seamen were wounded. Peterel captured one of the French boarders who reported that a broadside from Peterel had killed some 30 to 40 men on Superbe as she came up to board. On 27 October, Pitt, under the command of Lieutenant William Fitton, caught up with Superbe in Ocoa Bay after a 50-hour chase. Pitt captured Superbe, with Drake in sight, after Houx ran her aground. Houx and most of his crew escaped, though a number had been killed in the running battle with Pitt.

== Fate ==
Peterel was fitted as a receiving ship at Plymouth in August 1811 and served in that capacity until 1825. Peterel was put up for sale at Plymouth on 11 July 1827, and sold that same day to Joshua Crystall at Plymouth for £730.
