= HMS Imogen (1800) =

Sloop of the Royal Navy

History

France
- Name: Diable à Quatre
- Builder: Bordeaux
- Launched: 1792
- Commissioned: 1799
- Fate: Captured 26 October 1800

United Kingdom
- Name: HMS Imogen
- Acquired: by capture, 1800
- Commissioned: 1801
- Fate: Foundered 12 March;1805

General characteristics
- Type: Sloop
- Displacement: 350 tons (French)
- Tons burthen: 399 91/94 (bm)
- Length: 108 ft 2 in (33.0 m) (overall), 87 ft 3 in (26.6 m) (keel)
- Beam: 29 ft 4 in (8.9 m)
- Depth of hold: 15 ft 0 in (4.6 m)
- Complement: Privateer: 150; HMS:121
- Armament: Privateer: 16 × 6 & 12-pounder guns; HMS: Gundeck: 18 × 24-pounder carronades; QD: 2 × 6-pounder guns

HMS Imogen (or Imogene) was the French privateer Diable á Quatre, built at Bordeaux in 1792, that Thames and Immortalite captured in 1800. The Royal Navy took her into service in 1801 as HMS Imogen. She foundered in 1805.

== Origins and capture ==
Diable à Quatre was believed to have been built in 1792. She was commissioned as a privateer corvette at Bordeaux in October 1799, under the command of a Le Mestre or Le Maître.

On 26 October 1800 Thames encountered a French privateer at about 9:30 in the morning. Thames pursued her quarry for five hours. During the pursuit they came upon Immortalite, which joined in. The two British vessels finally captured Diable à Quatre some 36 leagues from the Cordouan lighthouse. She was armed with sixteen 6 and 12-pounder guns and had a crew of 150 men. She was only one day out of Bordeaux. Captain William Lukin of Thames described Diable a Quatre as "a fast Sailer, and is extremely well found". Beaulieu shared in the prize money for Diable à Quatre.

The Royal Navy took her into service as Imogen. The Naval Chronicle reported that on 6 March 1801, "that beautiful corvette La Diable Quatre, of 22 guns, was this day taken into Government service, at the price of £2,500, exclusive of her apparel, guns, and furniture."

== Career ==
The Royal Navy renamed Diable Imogen. Between May and August 1801, Imogen was at Plymouth, fitting out. There, in June Commander Richard Prater commissioned her. The new name apparently took some time to take.

The Naval Chronicle reported that on 28 October "Diable in Quatre" and Rosario had come into Plymouth Sound. Then on 15 November, Diable à Quatre was reported coming into Plymouth from a cruise. Finally, the Naval Chronicle reported that on 31 December, Imogene had come into Plymouth Sound from a cruise.

In November 1801, Commander Henry Vaughn replaced Prater.

After the signing of the Treaty of Amiens, ending the French Revolutionary Wars, on 14 April 1802 Imogene was one of several naval vessels transporting to Wexford, Waterford, Dublin, and Belfast Irish seamen who had been paid off at war's end. The Naval Chronicle opined that "this measure saves the gallant tars much expense, and reflects the highest credit on the Board of Admiralty."

During the Peace of Amiens Imogen participated in July–August 1802 in a small anti-smuggling squadron under the command of Captain King of Sirius. The other vessels in the squadron were Carysfort, Rosario, and Peterell. Imogene conducted at least one anti-smuggling patrol. She arrived at Cawsand Bay to victual on 19 July, and then returned on 8 August.

Vaughn recommissioned Imogene in October. Although Imogene had been paid off about three weeks earlier, by 23 October she had an almost full crew of volunteers. On the evening of the 27th, orders arrived directing Vaughn to prepare her as soon as the dispatches she was to carry had arrived. Mr. Thompson, her purser, was at the Victualling Office by 4 p.m., with the office carrying out the instructions with alacrity. Four days later Imogene sailed with dispatches for the Cape of Good Hope.

By March 1804 Imogen was serving with Commodore Hood's squadron in the Caribbean when she recaptured an English ship carrying a valuable cargo.

== Fate ==
Imogen sailed from Surinam on 27 January 1805 and St Kitts on 8 February as escort to a homebound fleet of some 30 vessels. On 11 February a leak developed. Initial efforts to pump her dry worked, but only briefly. Leaking worsened, with no clear source. The crew spread a sail under the hull, and that helped, again temporarily. The crew also threw guns and stores overboard to lighten her. Still, on 12 March her crew had to abandon Imogen. Her last known position was 42°46′N 28°07′W. Lord Forbes, bound for London, and other vessels in the fleet took aboard Imogen's officers and crew.
