= HMS Rosario (1800) =

Sloop of the Royal Navy

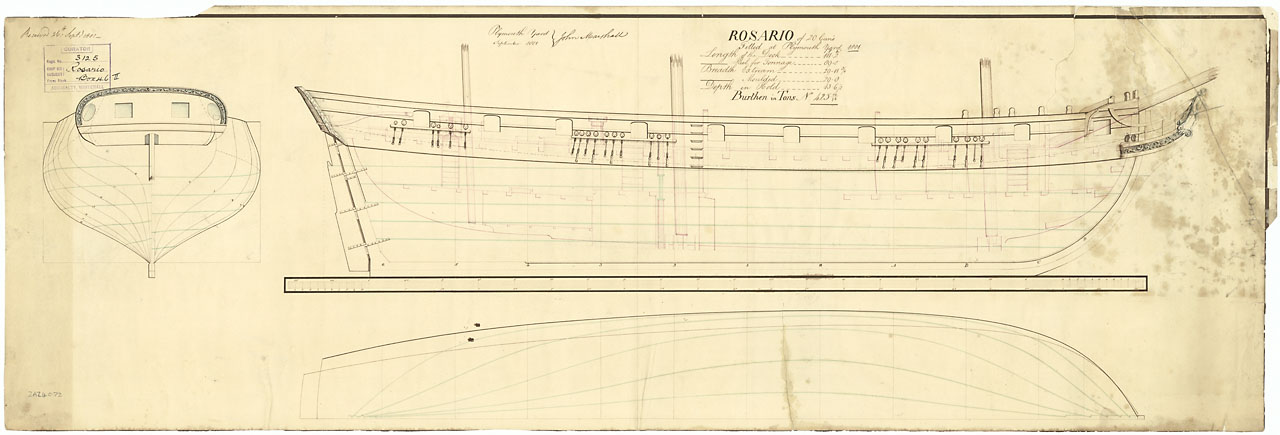
- Plan of HMS Rosario by John Marshall (Master Shipwright, Plymouth Dockyard, 1795-1801); National Maritime Museum

History

France
- Name: Hardi
- Builder: Bordeaux
- Launched: c. June 1796, or 1800
- Commissioned: 1799
- Fate: Captured 1800

Great Britain
- Name: HMS Hardi
- Acquired: by capture, 1800
- Renamed: HMS Rosario in 1800

General characteristics
- Type: Sloop
- Displacement: 350 tons (French)
- Tons burthen: 42544/94 (bm)
- Length: 111 ft 2 in (33.9 m) (overall), 89 ft 0 in (27.1 m) (keel)
- Beam: 29 ft 11 3/4 in (9.1 m)
- Depth of hold: 13 ft 6 1/2 in (4.1 m)
- Complement: Privateer: 194; HMS:121
- Armament: Privateer: 18 guns; HMS: 16 × 24-pounder carronades + 2 × 6-pounder guns

HMS Rosario was a 20-gun sixth rate of the British Royal Navy. She was previously the French privateer Hardi, which HMS Anson captured in 1800. The navy took her into service as HMS Hardi but renamed her HMS Rosario later in 1800. She was sold in 1809.

== Origins and capture ==
Hardi was a privateer corvette commissioned at Bordeaux. c. June 1796. She was commissioned as an armed merchantman in 1799, with 194 men and 18 guns.

At daybreak on 29 April 1800 HMS Anson encountered four French privateers: Brave (36 guns), Guepe (18), Hardi (18), and Duide (16). As soon as the French vessels realized that Anson was a British frigate they scattered. As Anson passed Brave going in the opposite direction Anson fired a broadside into her; Durham believed that the broadside did considerable damage, but he was unable to follow up as Brave had the wind in her favour and so outsailed Anson. Durham then set off after one of the other French vessels, which he was able to capture. She was Hardi, of 18 guns and 194 men. Durham described her as "a very fine new Ship just of the Stocks." The Royal Navy took Hardi into service, first as HMS Hardi, before shortly thereafter renaming her HMS Rosario. Lastly, Durham reported sending into port for adjudication a very valuable ship that had been sailing from Batavia to Hamburg with the Governor of Batavia as passenger.

Lloyd's List reported on 13 May 1800 that the "Hardy French Privateer, of 20 Guns and 150 men", had arrived at Plymouth. She was only 33 days out of the stocks and three days out of Bordeaux.

== Royal Navy service ==
=== French Revolutionary Wars ===
On 30 August 1801 Commander Richard Byron, "nephew of the late Admiral Byron, commissioned in Hamoaze, that beautiful corvette, La Rosario, of 18 guns." Then on 28 October "Diable in Quatre" (Imogen) and Rosario came into Plymouth Sound.

=== Peace of Amiens (1802-1803) ===
Byron sailed Rosario to the West Indies where she served on the Jamaica station. Byron's role was to observe the fleet that France had sent to assist General Charles Leclerc in his efforts to recapture Saint-Domingue (Haiti). (Leclerc attempted to reassert control over a slave rebellion, and eventual captured and deported Toussaint L'Ouverture.)

Rosario returned to Plymouth on 23 May 1802. There Byron landed at the pier $20,000 in specie that he had brought from Jamaica for merchants in London. While she was away, on 29 April Byron had received promotion to post captain.

Also on 29 April William Mounsey received promotion to commander; he was appointed on 17 May to command Rosario, an appointment he took up in June. During his time aboard her he was tasked seriatim with anti-smuggling patrols, carrying despatches to the Mediterranean, cruising on the Irish, Boulogne, and Havre stations, reconnoitering the enemy's ports in the north of Spain, assisting at the capture of the Danish West Indies, and escorting a convoy back to England from the Leeward Islands.

Initially, Mounsey sailed Rosario on 8 June to participate in a small anti-smuggling squadron under the command of Captain King of Sirius. The other vessels in the squadron were Carysfort, Imogen, and Peterell. On the 11th, the vessels were ordered to embark victuals for two months. They were to cruise from Berry Head to Mount's Bay, an area "infested with smugglers".

When Earl St Vincent and the Lords Commissioners of the Admiralty in the Commissioners' yacht visited Plymouth on an inspection tour on 27 August, Rosario and Childers fired a salute. The two vessels then moved to Cawsand Bay to remain there for the duration of the visit. They were still there on 5 September.

On the evening of 25 October dispatches from Rear-Admiral Dacres arrived by express from the Admiralty together with sealed orders for Rosario She completed her provisioning for a four-month voyage and next morning left Cawsand Bay for the Mediterranean.

Rosario returned to Plymouth from Malta on 26 March 1803 having left Gibraltar on the first of the month. She went into quarantine while the dispatches she was carrying went by express to London. On 4 June Rosario came into Plymouth with a large Danish vessel carrying timbers for the naval yard.

=== Napoleonic Wars ===
In July 1803 Rosario captured Liefde, from Berbice, and sent her into Cork.

A few days later, on 27 July, Rosario was east of The Lizard when she sighted and started to chase a French privateer ship. By 4p.m. Rosario was within gunshot of her quarry when Rosario had to drop astern having lost her fore top-mast because of the amount of sail that she was carrying. Fortunately Plantagenet had joined Rosario at noon and by 8 o'clock she came alongside the quarry, which struck her colours. The privateer was Atalante, six days out of Bordeaux, with a crew of 120 men under the command of Arnaud Martin. She was pierced for 22 guns but only had fourteen 6-pounders mounted, having thrown eight overboard during the chase. Captain Hammond of Plantagenet described Atalante as an "exceedingly handsome Vessel", and as sailing remarkably fast, having "run us nearly Ninety Miles in the Nine Hours." Endymion later shared in the prize money for Atalante.

Atalante arrived in Plymouth on 3 August. At the time Lloyd's List described her as being of 24 guns and having a crew of 150 men. The Admiralty took Atalante into service as Hawk, there already being an Atalante in Royal Navy service.

Next, Rosario recaptured and took into Milford Jacobina. Jacobina had been sailing from Surinam to Amsterdam when the Guernsey privateer Friends Goodwill had captured her. Then the French privateer Venture had re-captured Jacobina, only to lose her to Rosario.

On 30 July 1804 Rosario sent into Cork Bordeaux Packet, Hedelius, master, which had been sailing from Philadelphia to Bordeaux. At the beginning of September Bordeaux Packet arrived at Plymouth; there she was released and continued her voyage on 6 September.

The French corvette Sylphe captured on 13 May 1805 at 49°49′N 15°25′W a number of vessels in a convey that had left Cork on the 9th for Newfoundland. Rosario and Topaze each recaptured one.

Two French privateers captured Gabriel, Denche, master, on 30 April 1806 off Beachy Head. Rosario recaptured Gabriel on 2 May, and brought her into the Downs a few days later.

By one account, in 1806 Rosario was paid off as unfit for further service. In actuality, she was under the temporary command of first Commander Edmund Heywood, and then Commander Alexander Cunningham. It is possible that she underwent refitting at this time, though there is no record of this.

In any case, Rosario sailed for the Leeward Islands on 10 January 1807, under Mounsey's command. There she served in the squadron under Rear-Admiral Alexander Cochrane, in Belleisle, that was sent to occupy the Danish West Indies. The actual occupation of the Danish West Indies did not occur until 7 December, after receipt of news of the second battle of Copenhagen. (Note: A first class share of the prize money awarded in 1816, i.e., the share accruing to Mounsey and each of the other captains and commanders, was worth £398 10s 3½d; a fifth-class share, that of a seaman in the fleet, was worth £1 18s 10d.)

== Fate ==
Rosario returned to Sheerness by June 1808, having convoyed a fleet back from the Leeward Islands. The Principal Officers and Commissioners of His Majesty's Navy offered for sale on 21 December 1808 "His Majesty's Sloops Rosario, Renard, and Beaver, all lying at Sheerness." She took some time to sell, being last offered for sale on 18 May 1809.
