= HMS Union (1811) =

Ship of the line of the Royal Navy

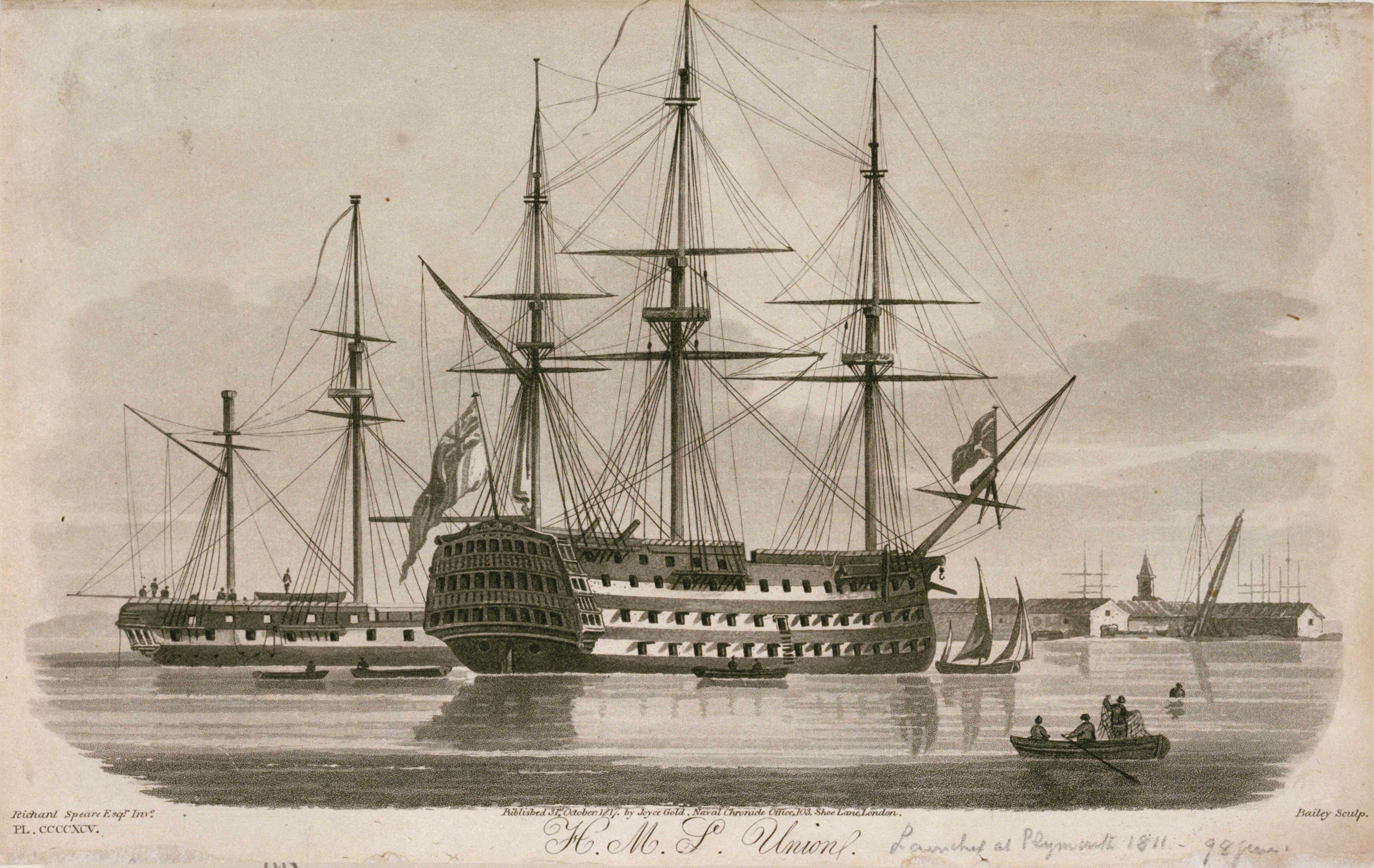

History

United Kingdom
- Name: HMS Union
- Ordered: 16 July 1801
- Builder: Plymouth Dockyard
- Laid down: October 1805
- Launched: 16 September 1811
- Fate: Broken up, 1833

General characteristics
- Class & type: Boyne-class ship of the line
- Tons burthen: 2,149 bm
- Length: 186 ft (57 m) (gundeck)
- Beam: 51 ft 5 in (15.67 m)
- Depth of hold: 22 ft (6.7 m)
- Propulsion: Sails
- Sail plan: Full-rigged ship
- Armament: 98 guns: Gundeck: 28 × 32 pdrs; Middle gundeck: 30 × 18 pdrs; Upper gundeck: 30 × 18 pdrs; Quarterdeck: 2 × 18 pdrs, 12 × 32 pdr carronades; Forecastle: 2 × 18 pdrs, 2 × 32 pdr carronades

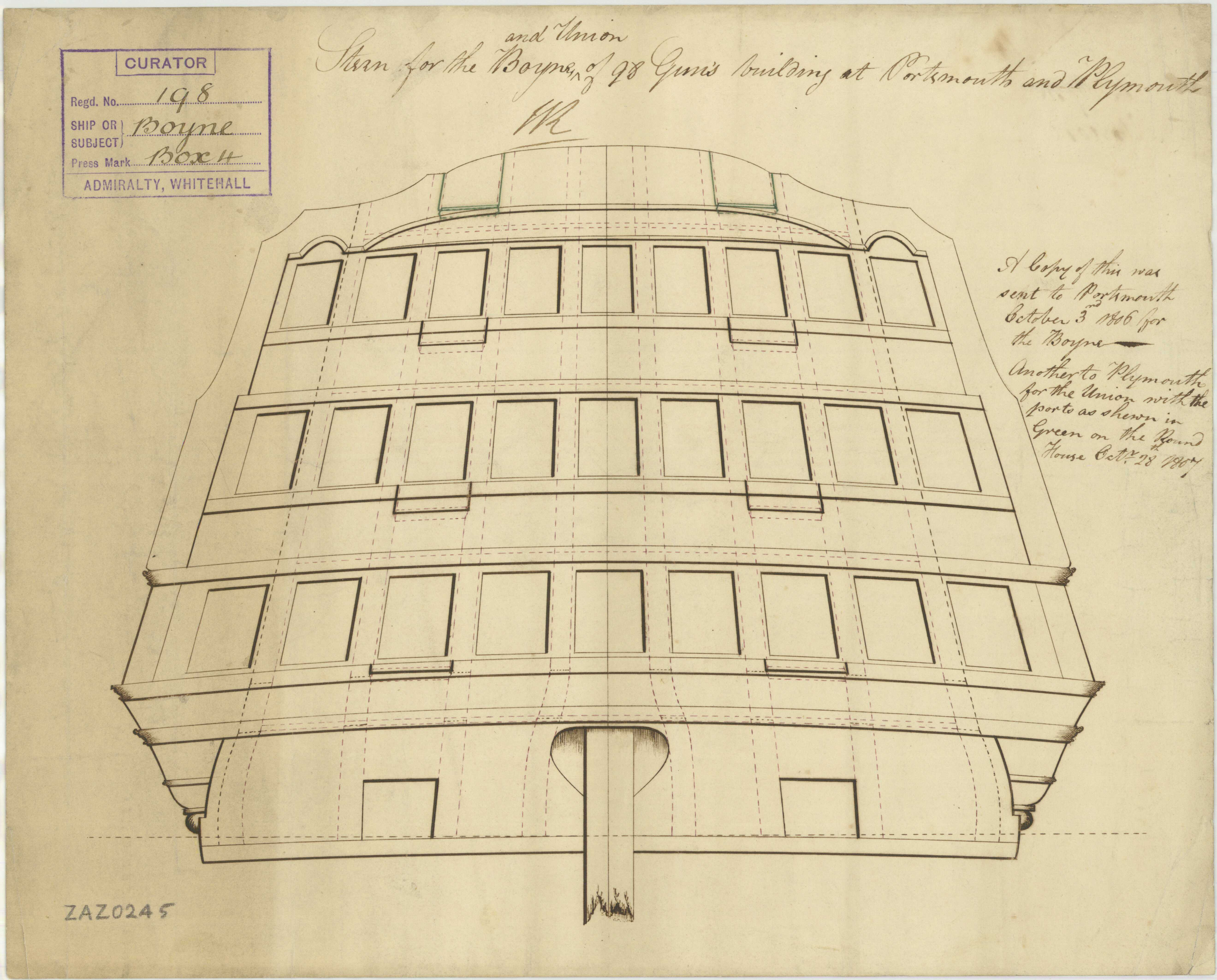
Stern of the Union

HMS Union was a 98-gun second-rate ship of the line of the Royal Navy, launched on 16 November 1811 at Plymouth Dockyard.

She was broken up in 1833.
