= Pierre Letuaire =

French painter, designer and caricaturist (1798–1885)

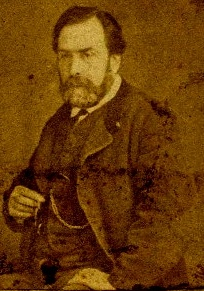
Pierre Letuaire (c.1862)

Pierre Letuaire (6 August 1798, in Toulon – 2 September 1885, in Toulon) was a French painter, designer and caricaturist.

== Biography ==
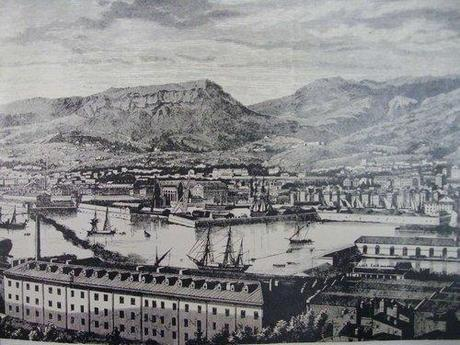
Toulon Harbor

He was born to a family of craftsmen and merchants. In 1815, not long after graduating from the Collège de Toulon his father, a master toolmaker, died and he became head of the family; a disabled mother and three siblings. He worked primarily as a designer of letterheads, labels, and similar items.

In 1823, he became a professor of design at his alma mater, the Collège. He would occupy that post until 1867. During his tenure, he created free drawing classes, open to masons, carpenters and other professional trades, for which he was awarded the Legion of Honor in 1860, during a visit by Napoléon III.

In 1837, he accompanied French forces to the Siege of Constantine; bringing back numerous sketches and portraits. In 1840, he exhibited his large composition, "Un épisode de l'armée d'Algérie". In 1844, he became a press correspondent for L'Illustration, and held that position until 1869. He also provided illustrations for Le Mistral, La Provence artistique et pittoresque and Le Monde illustré.

In 1867, on the occasion of his retirement from the Collège, he was presented with the Ordre des Palmes académiques and, the following year, he was appointed a municipal Councilor. His students included Vincent Courdouan and Barthélemy Lauvergne.

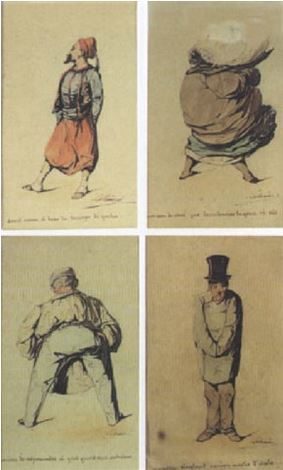
"Personnages"

He died of cholera, aged eighty-seven. The street where he was born was named after him. Many of his works may be seen at the Musée d'art de Toulon.
