= Jacques-Félix Brun =

French sculptor and designer

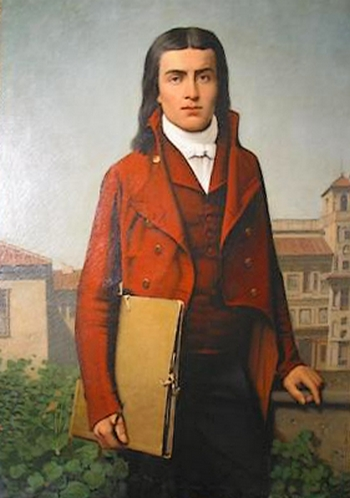
Jacques-Félix Brun; portrait by Auguste Laugier (?)

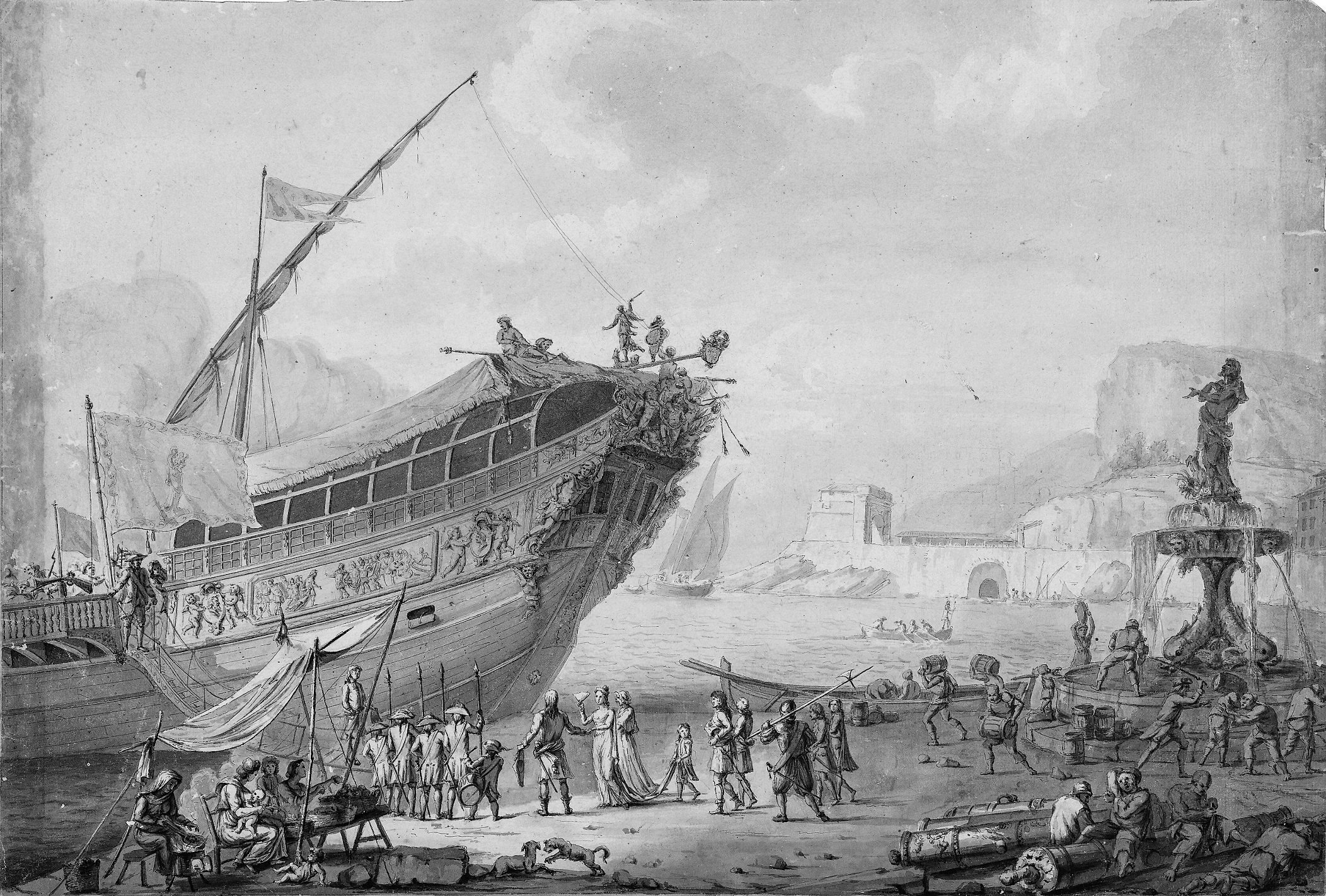
Open Seaport (ink drawing)

Jacques-Félix Brun, also known as Félix-Jacques Brun or simply Félix Brun (12 February 1763, Toulon - 28 February 1831, Toulon) was a French sculptor and designer.

== Biography ==
At a very early age, he entered the sculpture workshop at the Toulon arsenal, where he was trained by Antoine Gibert, the Chief Master Sculptor from 1763 to 1789. His talents were noted by the Intendant of the Navy and, in 1782, he was sent to study in Rome at the Académie de France for four years, at government expense. Under the direction of Jacques-Louis David, he was exposed to the Italian masters, and practiced sculpting in the ancient manner. Upon returning to Toulon, he was appointed a master sculptor. For the next thirty-five years, he worked on decorating 28 major vessels, as well as a number of smaller ships. In his later life, he was Director of the "École des Beaux-Arts de la Marine".

In 1796, he began a project to collect the wooden models of ships and their decorations, which were stored in the rope factory and various other places around the arsenal, and display them together at the workshop. In 1811, he created a list of the items and presented it to Charles Dupin, an officer of marine engineering, who convinced the newly appointed Maritime Prefect, Jean-Marthe-Adrien l'Hermite, to establish a permanent place for their display. As a result, in 1814, L'Hermite decreed the construction of what would become the Musée national de la Marine de Toulon; its management being entrusted to Dupin.

As most of Brun's sculptures were rendered in wood, the majority have disappeared. The Musée national is in possession of some plans and decorative items; for fountains, homes and other civilian projects. The Musée itself also has some decorations that he created for it. His "Open Seaport" (or "Imaginary Port View") has been widely reproduced.
