= HMS Caledonia (1808) =

Ship of the line of the Royal Navy

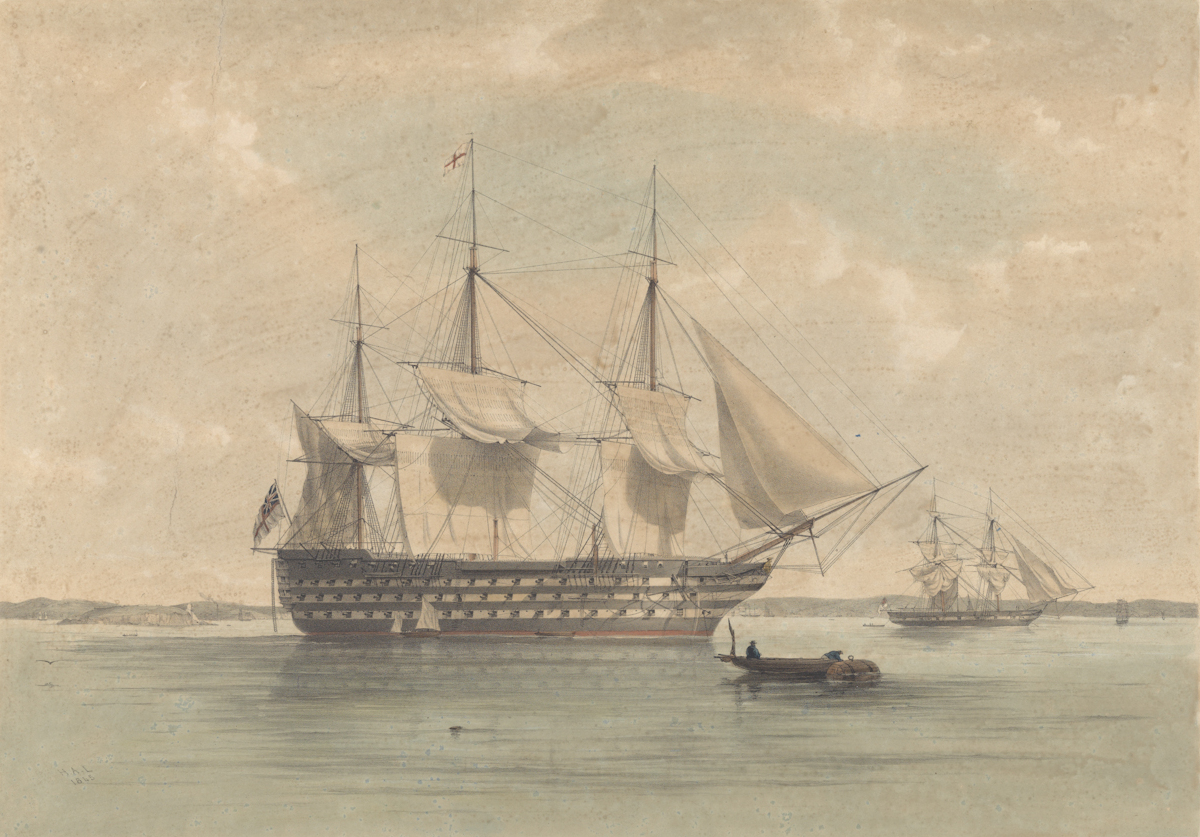
- Caledonia lying in Plymouth Sound

History

United Kingdom
- Name: Caledonia
- Ordered: 19 January 1797
- Builder: HM Dockyard, Plymouth
- Laid down: January 1805
- Launched: 25 June 1808
- Renamed: Dreadnought, 1856
- Fate: Broken up, 1875

General characteristics
- Class & type: Caledonia-class ship of the line
- Tons burthen: 26165/94 (bm)
- Length: 205 ft (62 m) (at the gun deck)
- Beam: 54 ft 7 in (16.6 m)
- Draught: 18 ft 2 in (5.5 m)
- Depth of hold: 23 ft 2 in (7.1 m)
- Sail plan: Full-rigged ship
- Complement: 875
- Armament: muzzle-loading, smoothbore guns; Lower gun deck: 32 × 32 pdr guns; Middle gun deck: 34 × 24 pdr guns; Upper gun deck: 34 × 18 pdr guns; Quarterdeck: 6 × 12 pdr guns, 10 × 32 pdr carronades; Forecastle: 2 × 12 pdrs, 2 × 32 pdr carronades; Poop deck: 2 × 18 pdr carronades

HMS Caledonia was a 120-gun first-rate ship of the line of the Royal Navy, launched on 25 June 1808 at Plymouth. She was Admiral Pellew's flagship in the Mediterranean.

== Description ==
The Caledonia class was an improved version of HMS Hibernia with additional freeboard to allow them to fight all their guns in heavy weather. Caledonia measured 205 feet (62.5 m) on the gundeck and 170 feet 9 inches (52.0 m) on the keel. She had a beam of 54 feet 7 inches (16.6 m), a depth of hold of 23 feet 2 inches (7.1 m) and had a tonnage of 26165/94 tons burthen. The ship was armed with 120 muzzle-loading, smoothbore guns that consisted of thirty-two 32-pounder guns on her lower gundeck, thirty-four 24-pounder guns on her middle gundeck and thirty-six 18-pounder guns on her upper gundeck. Her forecastle mounted a pair of 12-pounder guns and two 32-pounder carronades. On her quarterdeck she carried six 12-pounders and ten 32-pounder carronades. Above the quarterdeck was her poop deck with half-a-dozen 18-pounder carronades. In 1815 the 18-pounders on her upper deck were replaced by 24-pounder Congreve guns. Her 32-pounder guns were replaced by lighter 55 cwt models in 1831.

The ship was rearmed in 1840 with the 32-pounders on the lower gundeck replaced by thirty 56 cwt (Note: "Cwt" is the abbreviation for hundredweight, 56 cwt referring to the weight of the gun.) models and apair of 60 cwt 68-pounder guns. The 24-pounders on the middle gundeck were exchanged for thirty-two 56 cwt 32-pounders and a pair of 60 cwt 68-pounders while the 24-pounders on the upper gun deck were replaced by 40 cwt 32-pounders. Twenty-five cwt 32-pounder carronades replaced all of the guns on the forecastle and quarterdeck, four on the former and a dozen on the latter. All the guns on the poop deck were removed.

== Construction ==
The Admiralty orders for Caledonia's construction were issued in November 1794, for a 100-gun vessel measuring approximately 2,600 tons burthen. There were considerable delays in obtaining dockyard facilities and in assembling a workforce, and actual building did not commence until 1805 when the keel was laid down at Plymouth Dockyard. By this time the designs had also been amended to stipulate construction of a 120-gun vessel of 2,616 5/94 tons. When completed to this new design in 1808, Caledonia entered Royal Navy service as the largest and most heavily armed vessel of the time.

== Active service ==
Caledonia proved to be a very successful ship, and it was said that 'This fine three-decker rides easy at her anchors, carries her lee ports well, rolls and pitches quite easy, generally carries her helm half a turn a-weather, steers, works and stays remarkably well, is a weatherly ship, and lies-to very close.' She was 'allowed by all hands to be faultless'. In later years she was to become the standard design for British three-deckers.

On 12 February 1814 she took part with HMS Boyne in action against the French ship of the line Romulus off Toulon; the French vessel managed to escape to Toulon by sailing close to the coast to avoid being surrounded.

In 1831 she was part of the Experimental Squadron of the Channel Fleet under Sir Edward Codrington. On 12 September that year she took part in an experiment whereby she was towed by the frigate HMS Galatea by means of hand-worked paddles alone.

In 1856 she was converted to a hospital ship, renamed Dreadnought and became the second floating Dreadnought Seamen's Hospital at Greenwich, where she remained until 1870. In 1871 she was briefly returned to service, as a lazaret, to accommodate patients recovering from the smallpox epidemic of that year. Towed to the breakers in 1872, she was broken up in 1875.

images of HMS Caledonia
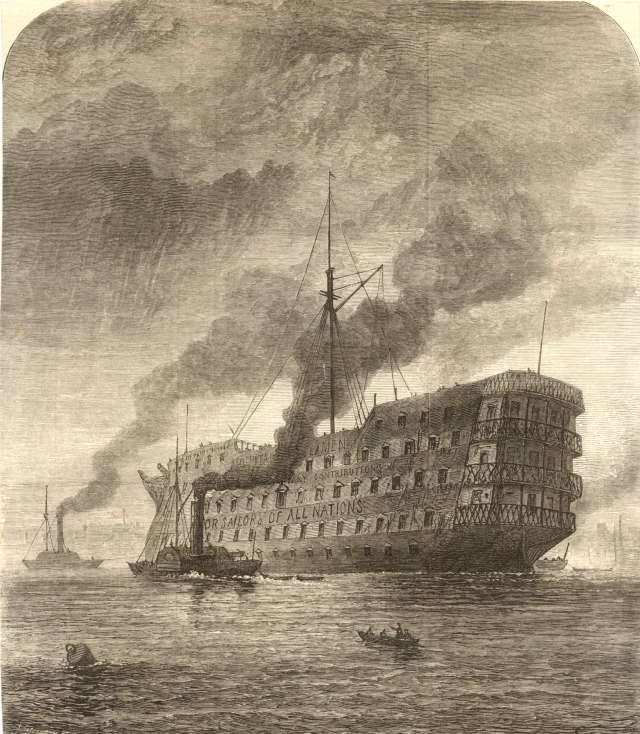
Caledonia as Dreadnought towed away on her final voyage.

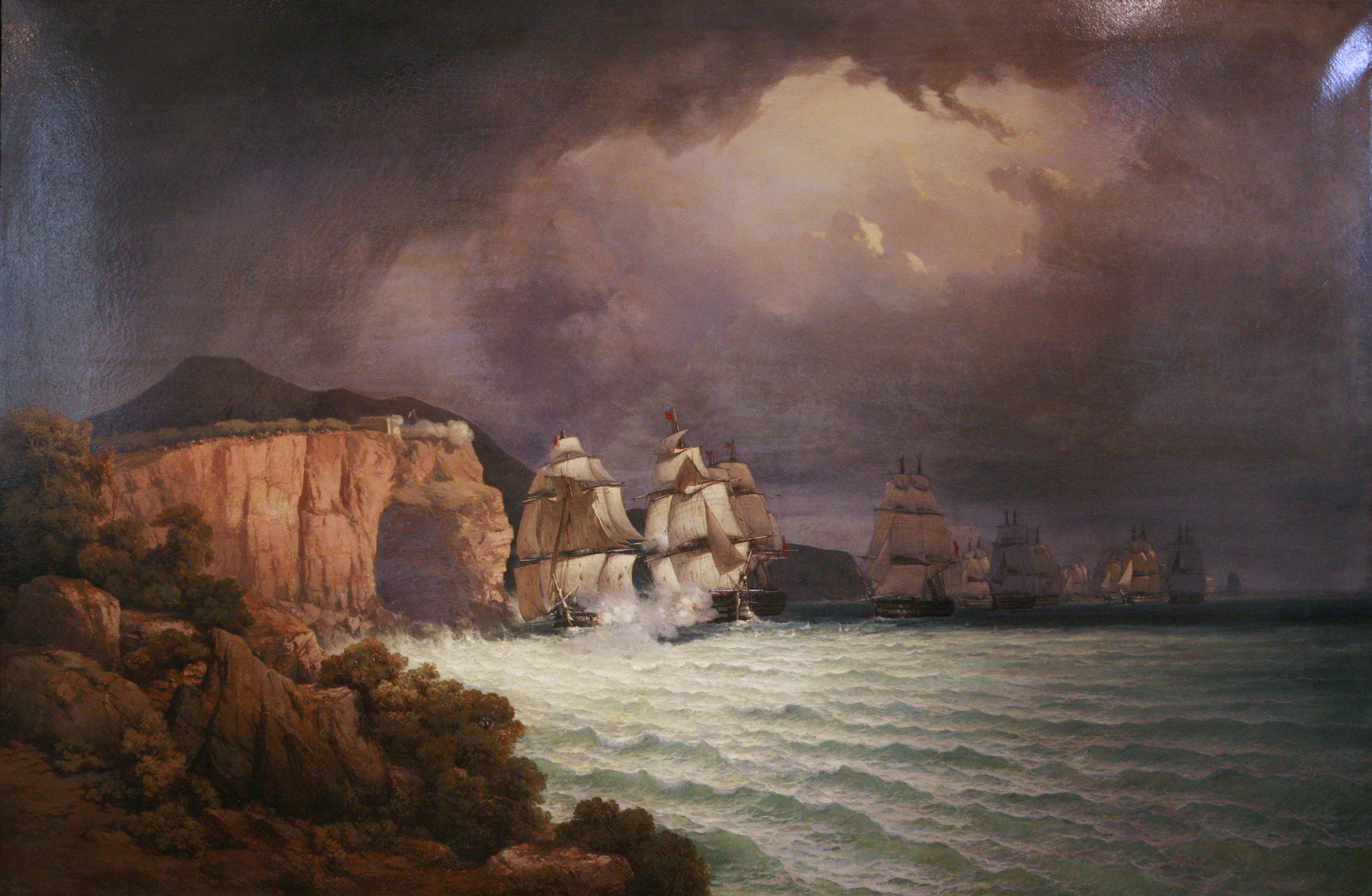
Fight of the Romulus against HMS Boyne and HMS Caledonia, by Vincent Courdouan
