= French ship Romulus (1812) =

Ship of the line of the French Navy

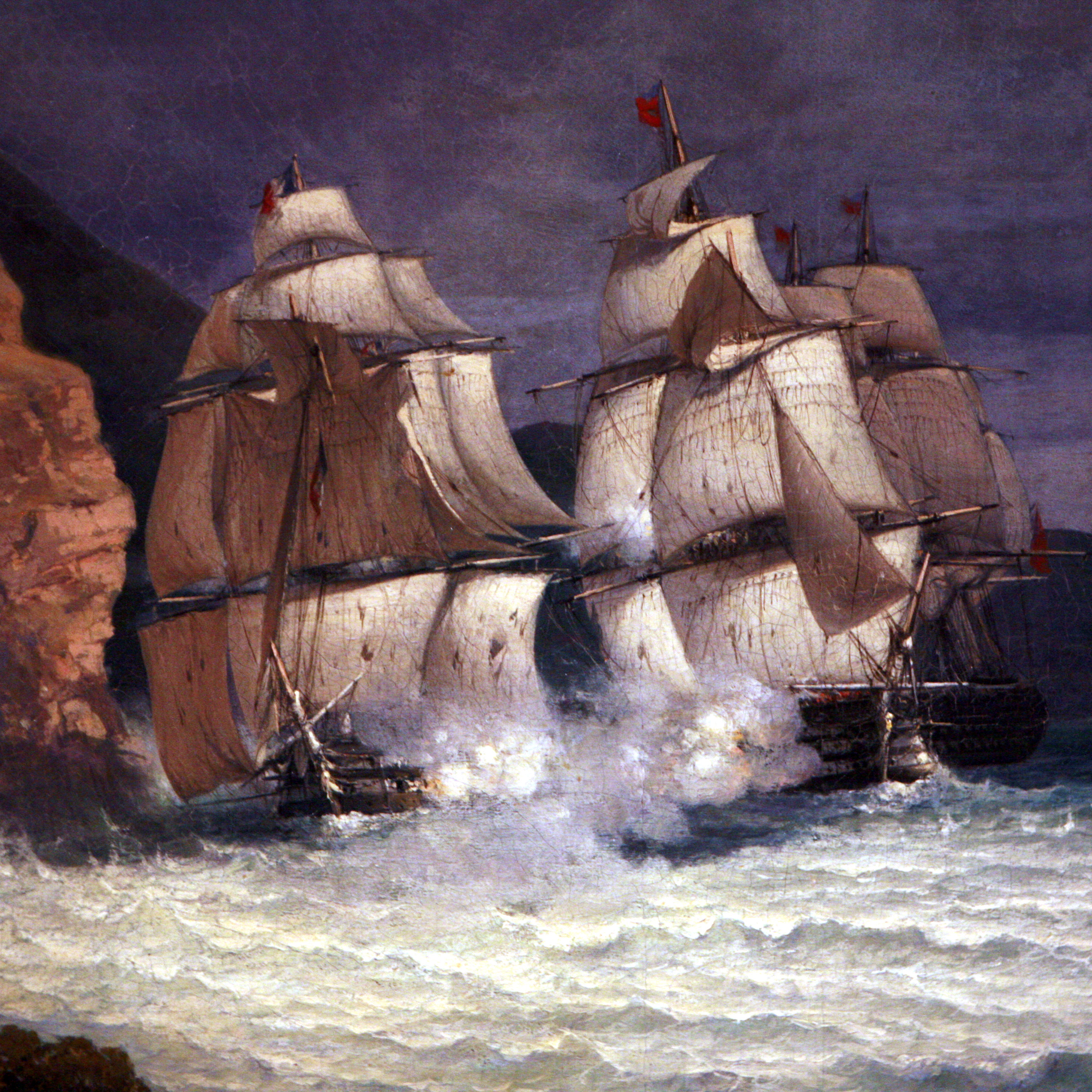
- Romulus (left) at the action of 13 February 1814

History

France
- Name: Romulus
- Namesake: Romulus, Warrior
- Builder: Toulon
- Launched: 31 May 1812
- Renamed: Guerrière in 1821
- Fate: Broken up in 1830

General characteristics
- Class & type: Téméraire-class ship of the line
- Displacement: 3,069 tonneaux
- Tons burthen: 1,537 port tonneaux
- Length: 55.87 m (183 ft 4 in)
- Beam: 14.46 m (47 ft 5 in)
- Draught: 7.15 m (23.5 ft)
- Depth of hold: 7.15 m (23 ft 5 in)
- Sail plan: Full-rigged ship
- Crew: 705
- Armament: 74 guns: Lower gun deck: 28 × 36 pdr guns; Upper gun deck: 30 × 18 pdr guns; Forecastle and Quarterdeck: 16–28 × 8 pdr guns and 36 pdr carronades

Romulus was a 74-gun Téméraire-class ship of the line built for the French Navy during the first decade of the 19th century. Completed in 1812, she played a minor role in the Napoleonic Wars.

== Description ==
Designed by Jacques-Noël Sané, the Téméraire-class ships had a length of 55.87 metres (183 ft 4 in), a beam of 14.46 metres (47 ft 5 in) and a depth of hold of 7.15 metres (23 ft 5 in). The ships displaced 3,069 tonneaux and had a mean draught of 7.15 metres (23 ft 5 in). They had a tonnage of 1,537 port tonneaux. Their crew numbered 705 officers and ratings during wartime. They were fitted with three masts and ship rigged.

The muzzle-loading, smoothbore armament of the Téméraire class consisted of twenty-eight 36-pounder long guns on the lower gun deck and thirty 18-pounder long guns on the upper gun deck. After about 1807, the armament on the quarterdeck and forecastle varied widely between ships with differing numbers of 8-pounder long guns and 36-pounder carronades. The total number of guns varied between sixteen and twenty-eight. The 36-pounder obusiers formerly mounted on the poop deck (dunette) in older ships were removed as obsolete.

== Construction and career ==
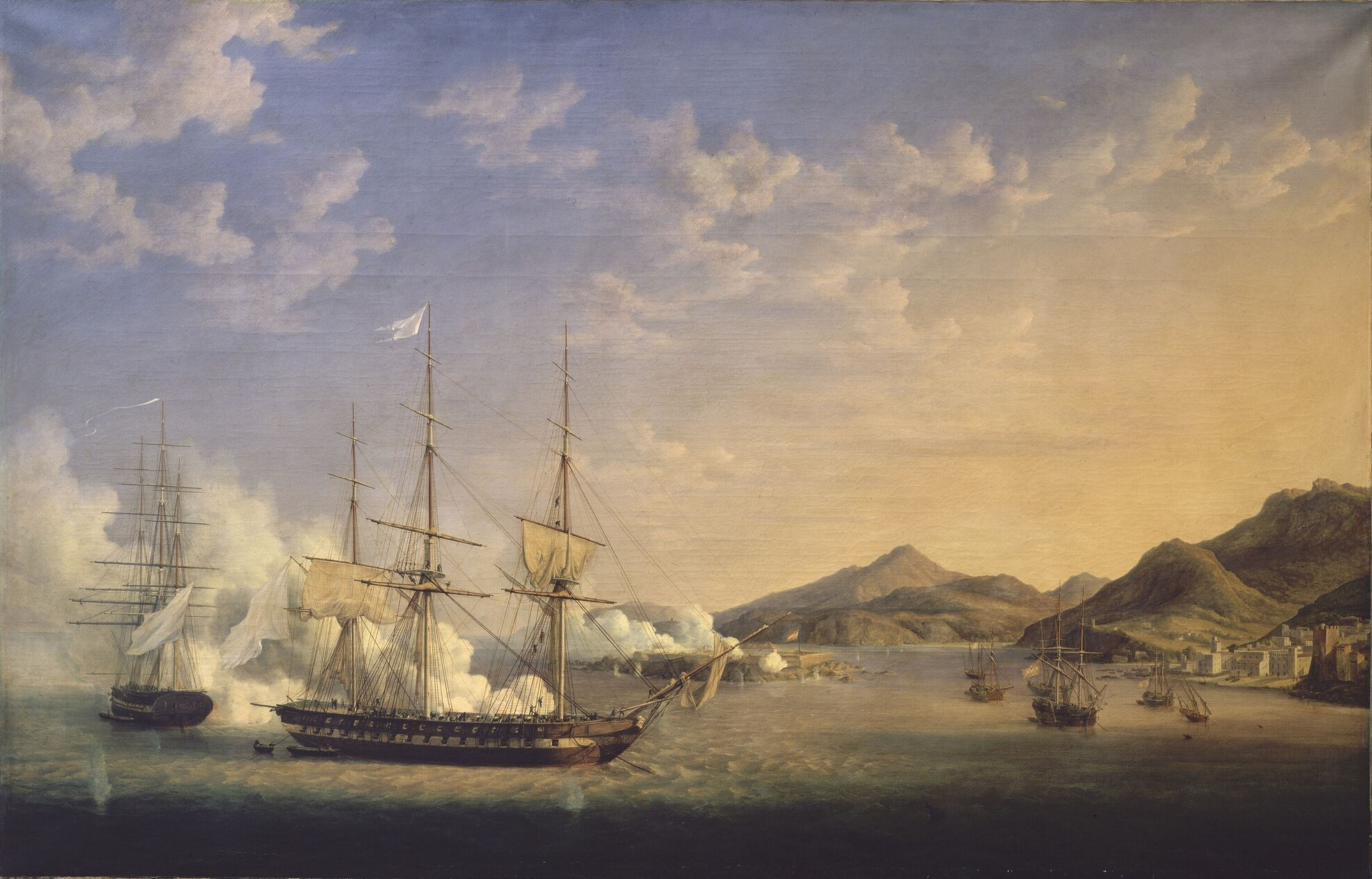
Guerrière (second from right) bombarding Spanish batteries in the Bay of Gibraltar on 13 August 1823

Romulus was ordered on 4 June 1810 and named on 23 July 1810. The ship was launched on 31 May 1812 at the Arsenal de Toulon, completed in September and commissioned on 26 September. In February 1814, commanded by Captain Rolland, she sailed from Toulon to Genoa, being part of a division under Julien Cosmao. On 13 February, she was engaged by three British ships of the line, notably HMS Boyne and HMS Caledonia, and managed to escape to Toulon by sailing close to the coast to avoid being cut off. By 1821, she had been razéed into a frigate, and renamed Guerrière.

== Bibliography ==
- Roche, Jean-Michel (2005). Dictionnaire des bâtiments de la flotte de guerre française de Colbert à nos jours [Dictionary of French Warships from Colbert to Today]. Vol. 1: 1671-1870. Roche. ISBN 978-2-9525917-0-6. OCLC 165892922.
- Winfield, Rif and Roberts, Stephen S. (2015) French Warships in the Age of Sail 1786-1861: Design, Construction, Careers and Fates. Seaforth Publishing. ISBN 978-1-84832-204-2
