= Charles Inglis (Royal Navy officer, died 1833) =

British Royal Navy officer

Captain Charles Inglis
- Died: 27 February 1833; Ryde, Isle of Wight
- Relatives: Charles Inglis (father)
- Military career
- Allegiance: United Kingdom
- Branch: Royal Navy
- Service years: – 1833
- Rank: Post-captain
- Commands: HMS Peterel; HMS Cruelle; HMS Vanguard; HMS Queen; HMS Canopus; HMS Impetueux; HMS Stately; HMS Rodney; HMS Queen Charlotte; HMS Victory
- Conflicts: French Revolutionary Wars; Action of 31 March 1800; Napoleonic Wars

Charles Inglis (died 27 February 1833) was an officer of the Royal Navy who saw service during the French Revolutionary and Napoleonic Wars, rising to the rank of post-captain.

Inglis was born into a naval family, the son of an officer who would die a rear-admiral, and followed his father into the navy. He rose through the ranks, and was a lieutenant aboard a frigate by 1798, when his ship fought an action against a French frigate, and succeeded in capturing it. Inglis had to take over command during the battle when his captain was injured, and was subsequently highly praised for his efforts. He then went to the Mediterranean, serving on a frigate forming part of Rear-Admiral Horatio Nelson's squadron. He again acquitted himself well in battle, when his ship attacked a much larger French warship, delaying her enough for more British ships to arrive on the scene and force her surrender. Nelson himself congratulated Inglis for his part.

Promoted to commander, and then captain, Inglis commanded several small cruisers, before becoming flag captain to Rear-Admiral George Martin. It was the start of an enduring relationship, with Martin retaining Inglis to be his flag captain on all his flagships. He served in several further engagements with the French fleets in the Mediterranean during the war, and also off the coast of Portugal during Martin's time in command there. He returned to Martin's side as late as 1824, when Martin became Commander-in-Chief at Portsmouth, flying his flag aboard HMS Victory, and with Inglis once more his flag captain. Stepping down on the expiration of Martin's post in 1827, Inglis died several years later, in 1833.

== Family and early career ==
Inglis was born the son of Captain Charles Inglis, a distinguished officer who had served in the navy since 1745, and who rose to the rank of rear-admiral before his death in 1791. He followed his father in embarking on a career in the navy, and was serving off the French coast as first lieutenant of the 32-gun frigate HMS Jason in 1798. While patrolling off the Penmarks on 29 June 1798 she and her consorts HMS Mermaid and HMS Pique came across the French frigate Seine. The Seine had crossed the Atlantic from the West Indies and was bound for a French port. The British squadron manoeuvred to cut her off from land, but the Mermaid, under Captain James Newman-Newman, soon lost contact, leaving the Pique under Captain David Milne and the Jason under Captain Charles Stirling, to chase down the Frenchman. After a chase lasting the entire day, all three ships ran aground on the French coast, but continued to bring their guns to fire upon each other, until HMS Mermaid returned to the scene, forcing the French to surrender. Seine was brought into the navy as HMS Seine. Stirling had been wounded early in the engagement and was forced to go below to seek treatment, leaving Inglis in command. Inglis acquitted himself well, prompting Stirling to write in his official report to Lord Bridport that 'no man could have filled my place with more credit to himself, and benefit to the state, than my First Lieutenant, Mr. Charles Inglis, whom I beg leave to recommend in the strongest manner for his bravery, skill and great exertions.'

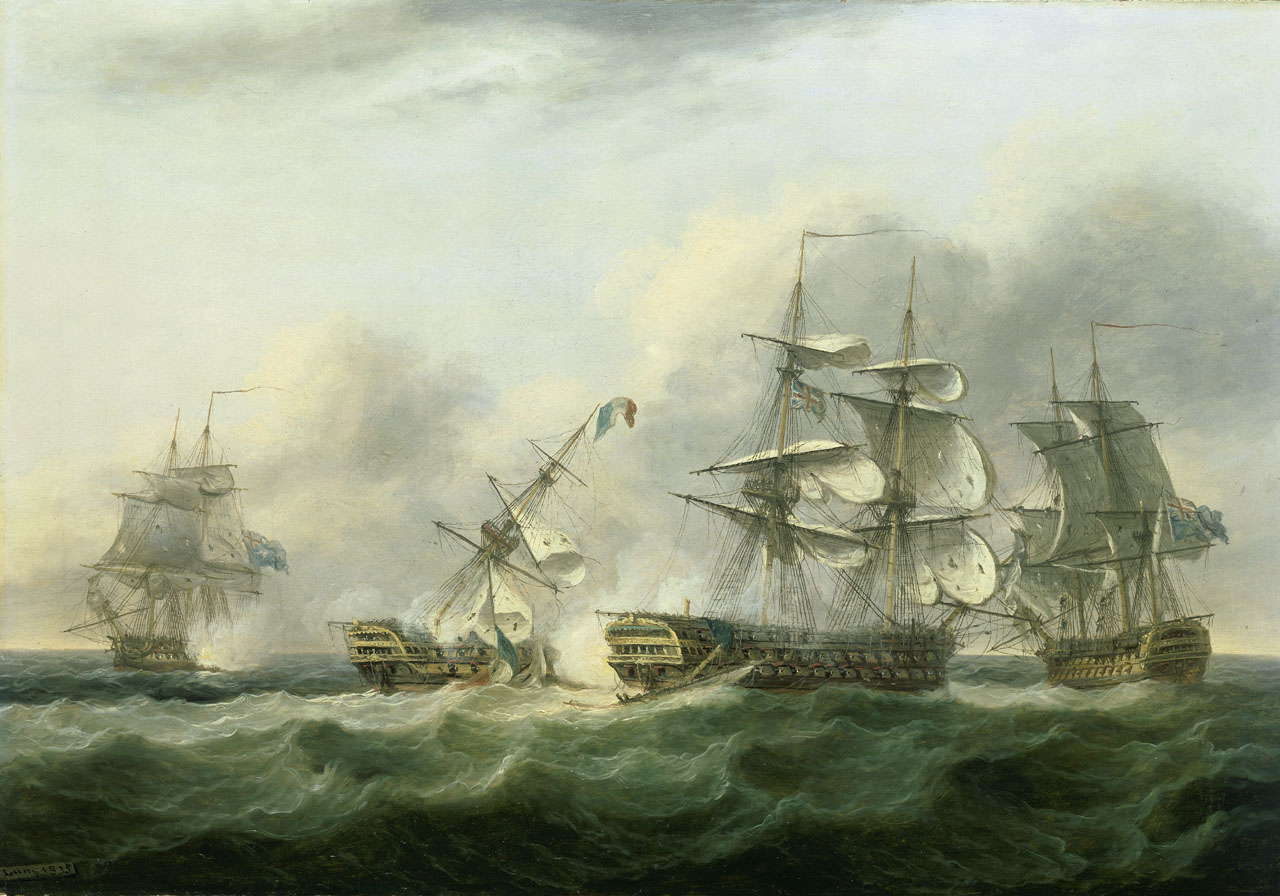
Capture of the William Tell, by Thomas Luny, October 1800; a depiction of the action of 31 March 1800

Inglis then went out to the Mediterranean, taking part in the blockade of Malta as a lieutenant aboard the 36-gun HMS Penelope, serving under Captain Sir Henry Blackwood. He was present at the action of 31 March 1800, when the 80-gun French Guillaume Tell attempted to escape Malta under Rear-Admiral Denis Decrès. The French ship's departure was observed by lookouts on Penelope and the frigate harassed the fleeing French ship until the larger ships HMS Lion under Captain Manley Dixon, and HMS Foudroyant under Captain Sir Edward Berry, could come up and join the engagement. Worn down, the Guillaume Tell was forced to surrender after being dismasted. Rear-Admiral Horatio Nelson wrote personally to Inglis after the capture;

"My dear Sir, how fortunate I did not allow you to quit the Penelope to be junior Lieutenant in the Foudroyant! You will now get your promotion in the pleasantest of all ways, by the gallant exertions of yourself and those brave friends who surrounded you on that glorious night. What a triumph for you - what a pleasure for me! What happiness to have the Nile Fleet all taken, under my orders and regulations! Blackwood's coming to me at Malta, and my keeping him there, was something more than chance. Ever my dear Sir, believe me your truly sincere friend, Nelson and Bronte."

== Command ==
Inglis was promoted to commander after this event, and was given command of the sloop HMS Peterel in October 1800, which was then lying at Rhodes. She went on to take part in operations against the French forces in Egypt. He was given command of the 10-gun cutter HMS Cruelle in February 1801, and continued in the Mediterranean.^{[a]} He received the temporary captaincy of the 74-gun HMS Vanguard in November 1801, during the brief absence of her captain, Sir Thomas Williams, and commanded her in the Baltic Sea. Inglis was promoted to post-captain on 29 April 1802 and commissioned the 32-gun HMS Tartar in June 1802.

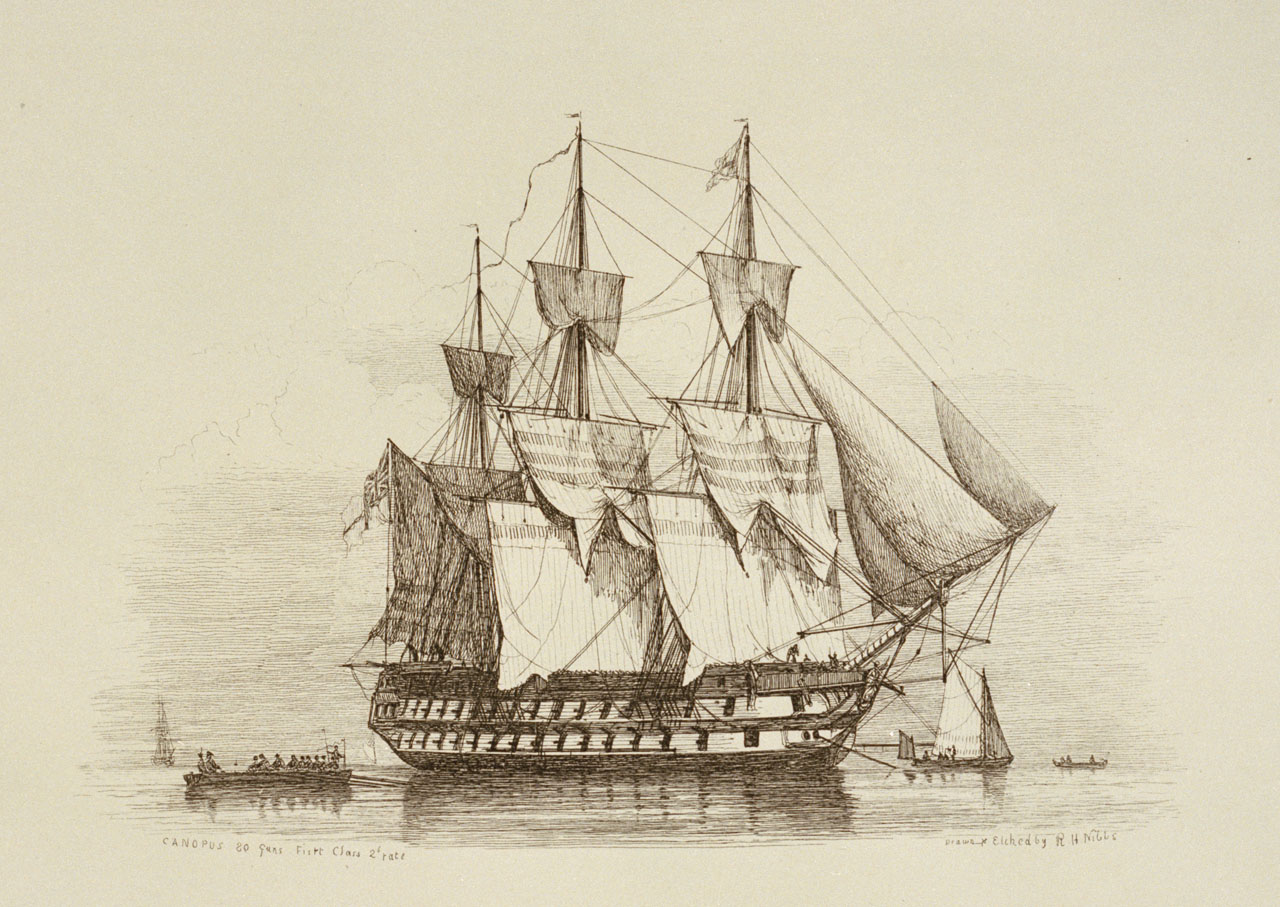
HMS Canopus, which Inglis captained from 1808 to 1812

In 1807 he began a long association with Rear-Admiral George Martin, when he took over command of the 98-gun HMS Queen and became Martin's flag captain. He followed Martin when he shifted his flag to the 80-gun HMS Canopus in 1808 and remained in command for the next four years, during which time Martin oversaw the capture of the Italian islands of Ischia and Procida in June 1809. In October Martin was dispatched with a small squadron to chase several French ships that had escaped from Toulon under Rear-Admiral François Baudin. Martin and his force discovered the French and chased them to the harbour of Cette at the mouth of the Rhone, where two ships, the 80-gun Robuste and the 74-gun Lion ran aground. Martin made plans to attack them, but their crews abandoned and burnt them on 26 October before he could carry them out. After a promotion to vice-admiral on 31 July 1810 Martin took command of the naval forces at Palermo, which had been tasked with supporting Sir John Stuart's forces in Calabria. Martin returned to England and went ashore on striking his flag on 14 October 1810, while Inglis remained with Canopus, which became the flagship of Rear-Admiral Charles Boyles between 1811 and 1812, and was paid off into Ordinary in February 1812.

Martin returned to sea command of the forces off Lisbon in 1812, flying his flag aboard the 78-gun HMS Impetueux, once again with Inglis in command as his flag captain. Martin remained in this role for the next two years, shifting his flag to HMS Stately and then HMS Rodney in 1813. Martin struck his flag on 24 June 1814, though Inglis's career at sea continued, taking command of the 104-gun HMS Queen Charlotte in May 1815, though by October he had been succeeded by Captain Edmund Boger.

== Later life ==
He was captain of HMS Victory between 31 January 1824 and 30 April 1827, during Martin's time as Port Admiral and Commander-in-Chief at Portsmouth. He died at Ryde, on the Isle of Wight, on 27 February 1833. He had at least one son, also called Charles, who followed his father into the navy and had reached the rank of post-captain by 1829.

== Notes ==
a. Cruelle was a former French ship, which had been captured off Toulon on 1 June 1800 by HMS Mermaid, and registered in the navy on 13 October of that year.
