= Action of 30 June 1798 =

Minor naval engagement during the French Revolutionary Wars

- Part of the French Revolutionary Wars
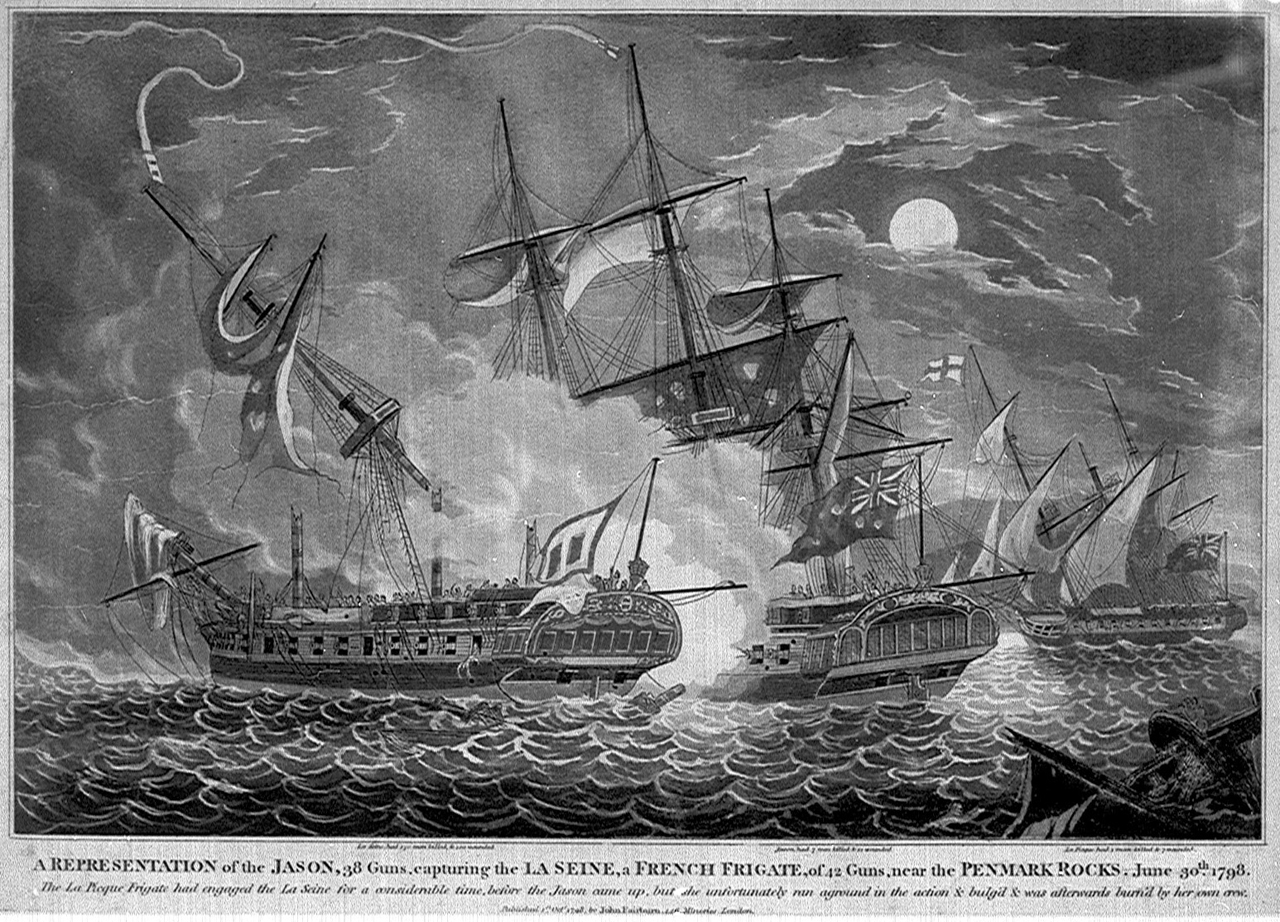
- A Representation of the Jason 38 guns, capturing the La Seine; John Fairburn, 1798
| Date | 29–30 June 1798 |
| Location | Bay of Biscay, Atlantic Ocean |
| Result | British victory |

Belligerents
| Great Britain | France |

Commanders and leaders
| Charles Stirling | Julien Bigot |

Strength
| 3 frigates | 1 frigate |

Casualties and losses
| 9 killed 18 wounded 1 frigate wrecked | 170 killed 100 wounded 1 frigate captured |

The action of 30 June 1798 was a minor naval engagement fought along the Biscay coast of France during the French Revolutionary Wars. The French Navy had been largely driven from the Atlantic Ocean early in the war following heavy losses in a series of failed operations. This had allowed the Royal Navy's Channel Fleet to institute a close blockade on the French naval ports of the Biscay coast, particularly Brest in Brittany. The blockade strategy included a constantly patrolling inshore squadron composed of frigates, tasked with preventing the passage of French ships into or out of the port. In the spring of 1798, several French frigates stationed in the Indian Ocean were sent back to France as the base at Île de France could no longer supply them effectively. One of these ships was the 40-gun frigate Seine, which departed Port Louis laden with 280 soldiers from the garrison.

Seine had a rapid passage back to European waters, arriving in the Bay of Biscay on 28 June. Early the following morning, with the Brittany coast in sight, Seine was spotted by the inshore frigate squadron of HMS Jason, HMS Pique and HMS Mermaid. While Mermaid cut Seine off from the coast, Jason and Pique gave chase as Seine fled southwards. Pique reached Seine at 23:00 that evening and for more than two and a half hours the frigates pounded at one another until Pique fell back. Pique and Jason continued the chase full speed through the night, until suddenly all three frigates crashed headlong into the sandbanks off La Tranche-sur-Mer on the Vendée coast. Even while grounded the frigates continued to fire on one another until Mermaid finally arrived and the outnumbered Seine surrendered. Jason and Seine were badly damaged but successfully refloated, the casualties on the packed decks of the French ship appallingly high, but Pique was an irretrievable wreck: the ship was evacuated and then burnt before the remainder of the squadron returned to Britain with their prize.

== Background ==
In the early years of the French Revolutionary Wars, although the French Navy had sought to oppose the Royal Navy at sea from their main base at Brest in Brittany, the Royal Navy had achieved victories at the Glorious First of June and Battle of Groix. The losses inflicted on the French Atlantic fleet in these battles were compounded by large numbers of ships wrecked in storms during the disastrous Croisière du Grand Hiver and Expédition d'Irlande operations. By 1798 the Royal Navy was unopposed in its control of the Atlantic, enforcing its supremacy by a strategy of close blockade, maintaining a battle fleet at sea off Brittany and an inshore squadron of frigates watching the approaches to Brest. In June 1798 the inshore squadron included a detachment comprising the 38-gun HMS Jason under Captain Charles Stirling, the 36-gun HMS Pique under Captain David Milne and 32-gun HMS Mermaid under Captain James Newman-Newman.

For French warships oceanic travel was extremely hazardous and ships often travelled in numbers. In the spring of 1796 a squadron commanded by Contre-amiral Pierre César Charles de Sercey had sailed from Rochefort to reinforce French naval forces in the Indian Ocean, based at Port Louis on the Île de France. Sercey's squadron failed to make a significant impression, driven off from the East Indies in an inconclusive action off Sumatra, and then tricked into fleeing from a vulnerable East India Company merchant convoy in the Bali Strait Incident in January 1797. By the end of the year the Colonial Assembly, which were unhappy with plans of the French Directory to abolish slavery, refused to continue supplying the squadron and garrison, forcing Sercey to disperse his ships. First Régénérée and Vertu were ordered back to France, and then in early 1798 the 40-gun Seine was instructed to follow them, carrying 280 soldiers from the garrison no longer supported by the Colonial Assembly. Seine, still commanded by Lieutenant Julien-Gabriel Bigot following the death of Captain Latour off Sumatra in 1796, sailed on 24 March, overcrowded with the stores and dependents accompanying the soldiers.

== Battle ==
Despite the overloading, Seine made a rapid journey to European waters, arriving in the Bay of Biscay just three months later on 28 June. Sailing for Brest with the wind, the Penmarck rocks were visible from Seine at 07:00 on 29 June when three sails appeared to the northeast. This was the inshore squadron under Stirling, and Jason and Pique immediately gave chase while Mermaid diverted northwards, cutting Seine off from the Breton coast and the harbour of Lorient and forcing Bigot to turn away, fleeing southwards towards La Rochelle and the Vendée coast instead. Jason and Pique followed under all sail while Mermaid was left far behind.

Throughout the day the chase continued, the British frigates gaining slowly on their quarry and as darkness fell Pique closed with the larger French ship. At 23:00 Milne was close enough to open fire on Seine, to which Bigot responded without reducing speed. For the next two and a half hours the frigates exchanged broadsides at full speed as the French coastline rapidly approached ahead. At 01:35 a shot from Seine struck the main topmast on Pique, bringing it crashing down. The consequent loss of speed forced Milne back, Seine pulling away from the smaller ship but unable to escape Jason which was steadily gaining.

Stirling was concerned by the proximity of the coast and hailed Pique with orders to anchor before it grounded, but Milne did not hear the order correctly and instead increased sail, lurching ahead of Jason and straight onto a sandbank close to La Tranche-sur-Mer on the Vendée coast. Seine too had struck the shore a little distance ahead, and Stirling was unable to arrest Jason's momentum before his ship too became stuck, lying between Pique and Seine. The French ship had been badly damaged in the crash, all three masts collapsing overboard at impact, but actually lay in a stronger position: Jason blocked Pique's arc of fire and Stirling's ship had swung with the rising tide, leaving its stern exposed. Bigot took advantage of this position to fire several raking broadsides into Jason, during which Stirling was wounded and command passed to Lieutenant Charles Inglis. Inglis responded to the fire by cutting stern gunports to fire chase guns at Seine, and Milne succeeded in dragging his frigate around through the novel expedient of ordering his men to run towards the bows carrying round shot. This sudden shift in weight gently rotated the grounded ship to face Seine and Milne could direct four of his 12-pounder long guns at the French ship. Under fire and with Mermaid finally approaching, Bigot determined that further resistance was hopeless and struck his colours.

=== Combatant summary ===
In this table, "Guns" refers to all cannon carried by the ship, including the maindeck guns that were taken into consideration when calculating its rate, as well as any carronades carried aboard. "Broadside weight" records the combined weight of shot that could be fired in a single simultaneous discharge of an entire broadside.

| Ship | Commander | Navy | Guns | Tons | Broadside weight | Complement | Casualties | | |
| Ship | Commander | Navy | Guns | Tons | Broadside weight | Complement | Killed | Wounded | Total |
|---|---|---|---|---|---|---|---|---|---|
| HMS Jason | Captain Charles Stirling | | 46 | 984bm | 494 pounds (224 kg) | 277 | 7 | 12 | 19 |
| HMS Pique | Captain David Milne | | 44 | 906bm | 314 pounds (142 kg) | 247 | 2 | 6 | 8 |
| Seine | Lieutenant Julien-Gabriel Bigot | France | 42 | 1146bm | 390 pounds (180 kg) | 610 | 170 | 100 | 270 |
Source: Clowes, p. 511

== Aftermath ==
Dawn on 30 June revealed the three frigates grounded on the sandbar, prompting a response from the French forces in nearby La Rochelle. Two frigates, a brig and a squadron of gunboats were sent to fire on the British ships, but this force was dissuaded from engaging by the arrival of another British blockade squadron comprising HMS Phaeton under Captain Robert Stopford, HMS San Fiorenzo under Captain Sir Harry Neale and HMS Triton under Captain John Gore. Stopford's squadron assisted Stirling's force as Jason was towed off by Mermaid. Pique however was irretrievably stuck with water leaking into the hull. After all efforts to refloat the ship had been exhausted, the frigate was evacuated and stripped of stores before the wreck was set on fire. It took some time for boarding parties to reach Seine and a number of the French crew had taken the delay in seizure of the ship to dive overboard and swim for the beach, making an accounting of casualties difficult. As the day continued, boat parties of French civilians sailed out to the ship and climbed aboard, breaking into the liquor stores leading to drunken confusion on deck. Bigot was allowed to go ashore temporarily, as were four men escorting a lady from Île de France: all five French sailors subsequently returned to captivity voluntarily. Seine was subsequently refloated with jury masts after the guns were thrown overboard to lighten the ship, and the figurehead of Pique was nailed over her own, Seine sailing with the squadron to Portsmouth.

Losses on the British ships had been light, with seven killed on Jason, including the second lieutenant, and eleven wounded, including Stirling. Pique lost one killed and another lost overboard and six wounded. French losses were enormous, the effects of concentrated cannon fire on the packed decks producing casualties of approximately 170 killed and 100 wounded, the former including a number who drowned after the ship grounded. Bigot and his crew were brought to Britain as prisoners of war, the commander later exchanged and twice promoted on his return to France in recognition of his resistance during the engagement, although unsubstantiated rumours persisted that he had personally shot some of his men when they abandoned their guns. Milne was complimented for his tenacious pursuit of Seine and after repairs he and his crew were confirmed in possession of the French ship, which served in the Royal Navy under the same name. By the time the prize was commissioned many of its captors were prisoners of war. On 13 October 1798 Jason was patrolling off Brest when a number of French luggers were sighted. Stirling gave chase but Jason ran headlong into a submerged rock near the Pointe du Raz and began to founder. Stirling had no choice but to bring the frigate inshore and land on the French coast as the frigate sank. Stirling and his men were captured, except for twelve sailors who, in groups of six, stole a cutter and a jollyboat and escaped to Plymouth.
