= HMS Halifax (1797) =

British-captured French ship

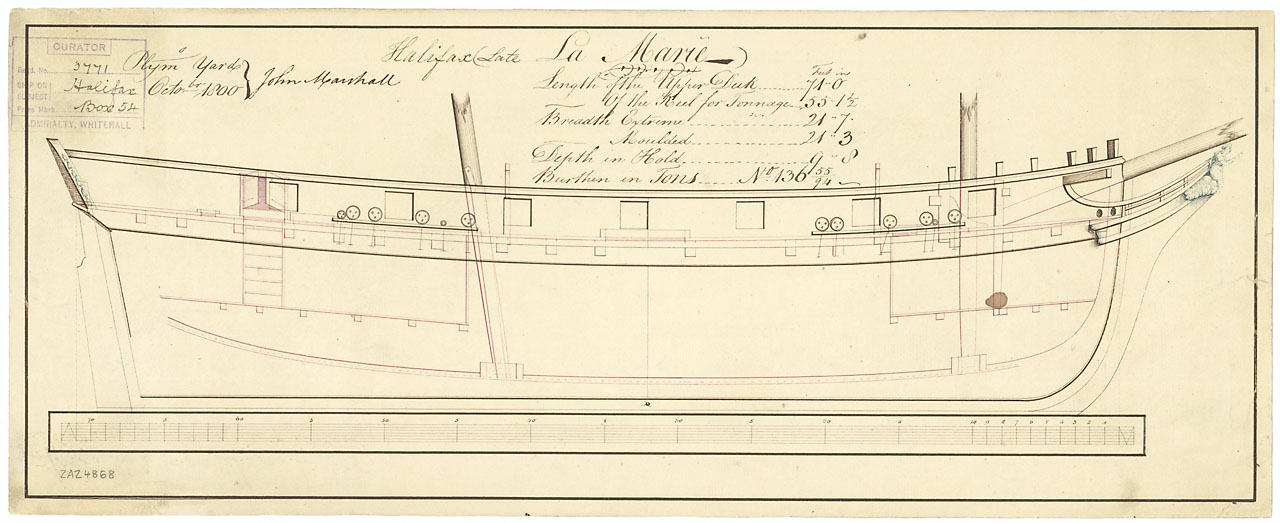
- Inboard profile of HMS Halifax, by John Marshall [Master Shipwright, Plymouth Dockyard]; National Maritime Museum, Greenwich

History

France
- Name: Marie
- Builder: Caribbean
- Commissioned: 1797
- Captured: 15 July 1800

Great Britain
- Name: HMS Mary
- Acquired: 1797 by capture
- Renamed: HMS Halifax
- Fate: Sold 1801

United Kingdom of Great Britain and Ireland
- Name: Halifax
- Acquired: 1801 by purchase
- Fate: Last listed in 1808

General characteristics
- Tons burthen: 13655/94, or 139 bm)
- Length: Overall:71 ft 0 in (21.6 m); Keel:55 ft 1 1/2 in (16.8 m)
- Beam: 21 ft 7 in (6.6 m)
- Depth of hold: 9 ft 8 in (2.9 m)
- Complement: French privateer: 60; RN service:55
- Armament: French privateer: 14 guns; RN service: 12 × 12-pounder carronades

HMS Halifax was the French privateer brig Marie that the Royal Navy captured in November 1797 and took into service. The Navy sold her in 1801 and she became the merchantman Halifax. She sailed between Portsmouth and Newfoundland and was last listed in 1808.

== French privateer ==
Marie was a privateer brig from an unknown home port in the Caribbean.

HMS Jason, Captain Charles Stirling, captured the French privateer brig Marie off Belle Isle on 21 November 1797. Marie was armed with 14 guns and had a crew of 60 men.

== Royal Navy ==
Marie arrived in Plymouth on 8 December 1797 and was laid up. Between December 1801 and July 1801 she underwent fitting for sea. The Admiralty initially named her HMS Mary, but renamed her HMS Halifax prior to her commissioning.

Lieutenant J. Scott commissioned Halifax in 1801. On 22 November it was reported at Plymouth that Halifax, Lieutenant J. Scott, had departed for Bantry Bay on 1 November, but had not arrived there by the 12th. As she had been out in the hurricanes on 1 and 2 November it was feared that she might have been lost. She was deleted from the Navy list that same year.

== Mercantile service ==
Halifax was not lost but instead appeared in the Register of Shipping (RS) in 1802. The entry described her as a prize taken in 1797, and reported that she had undergone repairs in 1801.

Year	Master	Owner	Trade	Source
1802	C.Goffe (Note: The identification of her master as Goffe is probably an error. In 1801 a Halifax, Goff, master and owner, of 138 tons, launched in Hull in 1769, came into Poole on 21 January 1801 a complete wreck. While sailing from Newfoundland she had encountered a storm on 1 January 1801 and had been so damaged that a French privateer, encountering Halifax would have nothing to do with her, instead advising Halifax to make her way to port as best she could. Halifax underwent repairs in 1801.); J.Randel	B.Lester	Portsmouth–Newfoundland	RS; repairs 1801
1808	J.Randall	Lester & Co.	Portsmouth–Newfoundland	LR

== Fate ==
Halifax was last listed in Lloyd's Register in 1808.
