= HMS Mermaid (1784) =

Frigate of the Royal Navy

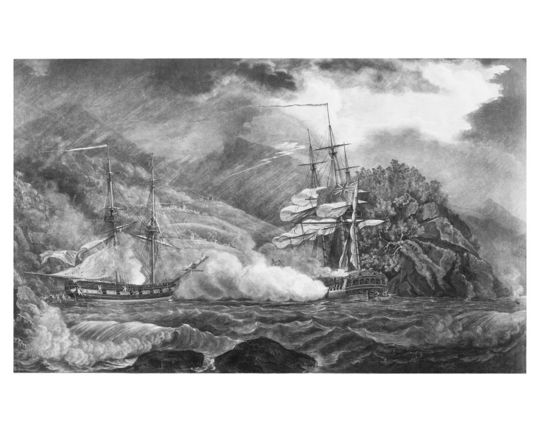
- Mermaid captures Brutus

History

Great Britain
- Name: HMS Mermaid
- Ordered: 27 August 1778 (Woolwich); Reordered 21 March 1782 (Sheerness)
- Builder: J. Pollard, Sheerness Dockyard
- Laid down: September 1778 (Woolwich); 29 July 1782 (Sheerness)
- Launched: 29 November 1784
- Commissioned: 30 December 1784 (for Ordinary), then June to August 1790 for sea duty
- Fate: Broken up in November 1815

General characteristics As built
- Class & type: 32-gun Active-class fifth-rate frigate
- Tons burthen: 69259/94 (bm)
- Length: 126 ft 2 1/2 in (38.5 m) (overall); 1,036 ft 9 3/4 in (316.0 m) (keel)
- Beam: 35 ft 5 in (10.8 m)
- Draught: 13 ft 2 in (4.0 m)
- Sail plan: Full-rigged ship
- Complement: 250
- Armament: Gundeck: 26 × 12-pounder guns; QD: 4 × 6-pounder guns + 4 × 24-pounder carronades; Fc: 2 × 6-pounder guns + 2 × 24-pounder carronades

HMS Mermaid was a 32-gun Active-class fifth-rate frigate of the Royal Navy, launched in 1784 and broken up in 1815. During the French Revolutionary Wars she served in the West Indies, the Channel, and the Mediterranean. During the Napoleonic Wars she first served in the Americas, but from early 1811 on, she was armed en flute and served as a troopship until she was broken up.

== Design and construction ==
Mermaid was one of the eight-ship Active class, designed by Edward Hunt. She was initially ordered from the shipwright George White, of Woolwich Dockyard Shipwright on 27 August 1778, and laid down in September 1778, but the order moved to John Jenner in April 1779. On 21 March 1782 the order was canceled and moved instead to Thomas Pollard, at Sheerness Dockyard, and the frigate was again laid down, on 29 July 1782. She was launched on 29 November 1782, and commissioned for the ordinary on 30 December 1784. She was commissioned again between June and August 1790 for sea duty. She had cost £12,854 to build, with another £2,539 paid for her fitting out in 1790. The Woolwich work had cost £1,807.

== Early career ==
Mermaid was commissioned under Captain Cuthbert Collingwood in June 1790 during the Nootka Crisis. She sailed to the West Indies, but returned in April 1791 and was then paid off.

== French Revolutionary Wars ==
She was again fitted out, this time at Portsmouth for £3,446, between February and May 1793, commissioning in March that year under Captain John Trigge. She was assigned to the Mediterranean, departing Britain on 22 May 1793. On 27 May she and Tartar captured the 20-gun privateer Général Washington, and on 30 May 1793 Mermaid and Castor captured the 16-gun privateer Angélique. Mermaid also captured a 14-gun privateer in June that year. Mermaid then joined Admiral Samuel Hood's fleet at Toulon.

=== The Caribbean ===
She came under the command of Captain Henry Warre in June 1794, and then sailed to the Leeward Islands on 5 May 1794. There on 10 October 1795 Mermaid captured the 10-gun Brutus off Grenada. However, the brig's crew of 50 men, together with some 120 troops, were able to get ashore before Mermaid could capture them. Brutus had been in the company of a ship that temporarily escaped. On 14 October Mermaid was able to find and capture the ship after a fight that cost Mermaid one man killed and three men wounded. The French ship was the French corvette Republicaine; she was armed with eighteen guns and had some 250–260 men aboard at the start of the action, one of whom was a French general on his way to take command of Grenada. In the action, the French lost 20 men killed and some wounded. Zebra shared by agreement. The Royal Navy took Republicaine into service as HMS Republican.

On 30 October 1795 Robert Waller Otway received promotion to post-captain; he took command of Mermaid the next month at Grenada. In February 1796 Mermaid briefly came under the command of Captain Charles Davers, but by April Otway had returned.

At the time Grenada and several of the other islands were in a state of insurrection, with the slaves joining the French inhabitants under the leadership of Julien Fédon in opposition to the British. Mermaid was off Labaye, in company with Favorite, when a British blockhouse came under attack from a battery that the rebels had erected. Otway led a landing party of seamen and marines that stormed the battery and destroyed it. Soon after, a large contingent of British troops landed near Labaye. At the same time two French vessels, under British colours, arrived with French troops from Saint Lucia. The British general wished to withdraw, but Otway declined to permit him to do so. Instead, Otway rode up a hill on which there were some field guns that he ordered to fire on the French vessels. The battery commander did so, with the result that the French vessels withdrew, having failed to land their troops. Favorite pursued the French vessels but could not keep up after losing her topmast. The British troops then attacked and captured Pilot Hill.

On 22 July Mermaid and Favorite recaptured the sloop Two Sisters.

Then on 8 August, Rear-Admiral Pole, in Carnatic, was lying at The Saintes with several British vessels, including Mermaid, when a strange vessel was sighted. Pole dispatched Mermaid to investigate. The vessel turned out to be the 40-gun French frigate Vengeance. An engagement ensued in which Mermaid managed to inflict heavy casualties although Vengeance outgunned her. When the 40-gun British frigate Beaulieu came up Vengeance retired, taking refuge under the batteries in the roads of Basse-Terre. Mermaid suffered no casualties, but later reports were that the French had lost 12 men killed and 26 wounded.

Mermaid and Resource, on 10 December 1796, captured the French brig-corvette Général Leveau, of 16 guns and 80 men, off San Domingo. On the south side of the island Mermaid also captured a Dutch brig that was carrying several thousand dollars and a cargo of dry goods, and a Spanish schooner, which was carrying raw hides. Mermaid then captured the privateer Liberté Générale on 7 March 1797.

On 20 April 1797 Mermaid formed part of a squadron under Captain Hugh Pigot in the 32-gun frigate Hermione, that also included Quebec, the 14-gun brig Drake, and the cutter Penelope. The squadron cut out nine ships at Jean-Rabel without suffering any casualties. Most of the ships the British were able to cut out were actually British merchant vessels that French privateers had captured.

=== English Channel and the Mediterranean ===
James Newman-Newman took command of Mermaid around mid-1797. Mermaid captured "sundry prizes" between 28 December and 1 January 1798, and 16 January and 28 February. She also shared in Phaeton's capture or recapture of Aventure, Hazard, and Daphne, and with Phaeton and a number of other vessels in the capture or recapture of the chasse maree Marie Perota, the Sea Nymphe, the Mary, and an unnamed French sloop.

Additionally, on 19 February Mermaid, Phaeton, and Sylph, Anson, and Nymphe recaptured Lighthorse. Two days later, Mermaid and Sylph met up with Phaeton, having captured the American vessel Eliza, which had sailed from Batavia for Amsterdam via Boston, where she had changed her papers but not her cargo. Phaeton sent Sylph into port with Eliza and the French privateer Legere, which Phaeton had captured. In addition to Mermaid, Phaeton, and Sylph, Anson and Nymphe shared in the proceeds of the capture of both vessels. The same squadron shared in the recapture, on the next day, of the Danish Indiaman Graff fon Bernstoff. On 21 May Mermaid captured the Two Brothers; Clyde and the hired armed cutter Cygnet shared in the proceeds of the capture.

While patrolling off the Penmarks on 29 June 1798 Mermaid, Pique, and Jason came across the French frigate Seine, which was bound for Lorient. (Note: The letter describing the action has Seine coming from Île de France;) At the action of 30 June 1798, The British squadron manoeuvred to cut Seine off from land, but Mermaid soon lost contact, leaving Pique, under Captain Milne, and Jason under Captain Charles Stirling, to chase down the Frenchman.

The chase lasted until 11 o'clock at night, when Pique was able to range alongside Seine and fire a broadside. The two exchanged fire for several hours, with the lighter Pique suffering considerable damage to her masts and rigging. Jason then arrived and Captain Stirling called upon Milne to anchor, but Milne did not hear. Determined to see Seine captured, Pique pressed on but suddenly ran aground. Jason too ran aground before she could swing way. Furthermore, Seine was observed to have grounded and to have lost all her masts in the process. As the tide rose Seine was able to swing into a position to rake the two British ships. With difficulty the sailors of Jason dragged several guns to the bow in order to exchange fire, while Pique was able to bring her foremost guns to bear. Already under fire from both British ships, the appearance on the scene of Mermaid convinced the French to surrender. Jason had lost seven killed and 12 wounded, while Pique sustained casualties of one killed, one missing, and six wounded. Seine however had 170 killed and 100 wounded.

Mermaid was next involved in the capture of the French frigate Loire in the aftermath of the Battle of Tory Island.

Mermaid was detached to operate off Corunna and together with Sylph, captured the Spanish packet Golondrina on 24 March 1799 after a 15-hour chase. Golondrina was pierced for 20 guns but was carrying only four. She was under the command of Don Juan El Busto and was 39 days out of Havana on her way to Corruna with a cargo of sugar, cocoa, and indigo. Newman described her as being of 200 tons burthen, coppered, and a remarkably fast vessel.

In April 1799 Captain Robert Dudley Oliver, replaced Newman-Newman in command of Mermaid off France and Italy. Thereafter Mermaid appears to have spent much of her time patrolling the coasts and intercepting coasters. On 4 December Mermaid captured the Portuguese vessel Voador.

On 10 and 11 January 1800, Mermaid captured the French privateers Redoubtable, General Massena, and Vengeur. A month later, on 10 February, Mermaid recaptured a Neapolitan brig that was on her way from Palermo to Leghorn with a cargo of "locusts". Mermaid was in sight but too far away to render assistance when Peterel, of 24 cannons, captured the brig Ligurienne, of 16 cannons, and drove the ship Cerf, of 14 guns, and the xebec Joliet, of six guns, on shore. The whole action took place under the guns of two shore batteries and so close to shore that Peterel grounded for a few minutes.

On 10 and 11 March, Mermaid captured three French merchant vessels:

- ketch Bagnolese, which was sailing from Port Maurice bound to Marseilles with a cargo of oil;
- a Tartane; and
- a Settee, in ballast.

Between 15 and 16 March Mermaid captured seven merchant vessels:

- French tartane Francesco Xaviera, which was sailing from Louano to Marseilles with a cargo of oil;
- French settee Agriculture, carrying deals;
- Genoese brig Ligurier, sailing from Genoa to Cette with oil;
- French settee sailing from Cannes to Marseilles with oil and soap;
- Spanish brig Nostra Senora del Carmen, sailing with oil; and,
- Genoese tartan Annonciation, sailing from Arrache to Marseilles with a cargo of oil.

Between 2 and 6 April, Mermaid captured and destroyed nine merchant vessels that were carrying grain and wine to French forces at Genoa. The vessels had taken refuge under the guns of a fort in the small islands off Cape Croisette, south of Marseilles. One evening Oliver anchored Mermaid within grapeshot of the fort, which he cannonaded for an hour while two boats went in and cut out six vessels. The British suffered no casualties.

On 11 May, Mermaid captured the settee St Joseph, which was selling from Sardinia to Marseilles in ballast. Four days later Mermaid captured the Genoese settee Nostra Dame de Rosario, which was carrying wheat from Marseilles to Genoa. Four days after that Mermaid captured a settee, in ballast.

Then on 1 June about 12 leagues (58 km) southward of Les Hières Mermaid captured Cruelle, which was eight hours out of Toulon. Cruelle was a brig of six guns, four of which she had thrown overboard during the chase, and had a crew of 43 men under the command of Ensigne de vaisseau Francis Xavier Jeard. She had been a bomb vessel but had left her mortar at Toulon. She was carrying supplies for Malta when Mermaid intercepted her. The British took Cruelle into service under her existing name.

In the month between 19 July and 20 August, Mermaid captured ten vessels, five of which she burnt or scuttled. Four were the French settee Bien Venue, which had been sailing from Fréjus to Marseilles with deals (long wooden planks), the French settee San Antonio, which was sailing from Oneglia to La Silva with a cargo of snuff, the French settee Saint Pierre, which was sailing from Bandol to Marseilles with firewood, and an unnamed Spanish settee carrying barilla. Mermaid ran one French settee, which was carrying wheat, ashore and scuttled her too. The three vessels Mermaid kept were the Spanish sloop Saint Juan Baptiste, which was sailing from Cette to Genoa with wine, an unnamed Spanish settee carrying barilla, the French settee Sainte Barbe, which was sailing from Marseilles with wheat, the French ketch Notre dame de la Providence, which was sailing from Marseilles to Genoa with wine and flour, and the Genoese settee Conception, which was sailing from Bandol to Genoa with wine.

On 11 October Mermaid's boats cut out from La Vendour four vessels carrying wine and flour.

On 18 February 1801, Mermaid and Mercury captured the ship Esperanza (or Esperance), which had sailed from Tunis with a cargo of silk, cotton, and other merchandise. Three days later, Mermaid captured the Genoese settee Beato, sailing from Selloa to Port Maurice with wine. The next day, Mermaid captured three settees:

- St. Christe, carrying oil and almonds;
- Vierge de Carmo, carrying wine; and
- Rhone, carrying oil and rice.

Then on 17 May Mermaid captured the French transport brig Barthelemy, which was sailing from Toulon to Cartagena. After the signing of the Treaty of Amiens, which ended the war between Britain and France, Mermaid returned to Britain where in August 1802 she was paid off and placed in ordinary at Woolwich.

== Napoleonic Wars ==
Mermaid was fitted out again between June and September 1803, commissioning in August that year under Captain Aiskew Hollis. She spent the period between 1804 and 1807 at Jamaica. During the first half of 1804 Mermaid recaptured the British ship Stranger.

Mermaid was at Havana in October 1804 when war with Spain was declared. Hollis successfully brought some British merchant ships in the harbour out and then convoyed them to safety.

She was then on the Halifax Station. On 6 July 1806 Mermaid and Cleopatra captured the American brig Jennet. Mermaid was paid off again on 20 August 1807.

Mermaid returned to service after being refitted at Woolwich between September 1808 and March 1809. She was recommissioned in February 1809 under Captain Major Jacob Henniker. She then sailed on 12 June 1809 with a troop convoy bound for Portugal.

She was recommissioned as an 18-gun troopship in January 1810, and was fitted out as a troopship at Chatham Dockyard between October 1810 and February 1811. She then came under the command of Commander William Henry Percy in 1811. Percy and Mermaid then transported troops between Britain and Iberia for the Peninsular War.

By April 1812 Mermaid was under Commander David Dunn, serving in the Mediterranean. In October 1813 she participated in the attack on Trieste.

On 30 November, Edinburgh, Furieuse and Mermaid embarked 1,000 men of the Italian levy, under the command of Lieut-Colonel Catanelli, at Milazzo. America and Termagant joined them. They sailed the same evening and, accompanied by Armada and Imperieuse, landed them at Viareggio. Some 600 cavalry and infantry from the Livorno garrison attacked the troops, who routed them, capturing two field pieces and a howitzer. From the prisoners they learned of the weak state of the garrison and asked to be re-embarked to be taken to Livorno. Boats of the squadron towed them off the shore in country vessels and the ships towed the whole to the Livorno roads. The troops and marines landed on the evening of 13 December and they occupied the suburbs of the town. Some 700 cavalry and infantry attacked the marines, who opened to let the cavalry pass through them, killing all but 14 men and two officers. Of these, the Italian Levy killed all but one officer. The marines charged and routed the remainder, killing, wounding or taking prisoner between 250 and 300 men. Edinburgh had three marines wounded. The 1000 men of the Italian Levy marched inland and captured Lucca. They then returned to Via Reggio. There was further fighting around Pisa and Via Reggio before the expedition re-embarked aboard the British warships.

In early 1814, a British squadron, consisting of Milford, Eagle, Tremendous, Mermaid, Wizard, and Weazel joined a force of 1500 Austrians to capture Trieste and its 80 guns.

== Fate ==
Mermaid was first offered for sale at Plymouth on 9 August 1815. The buyer had to post bond of £3000, with two sureties, that he would not resell her and that he would break her up within 12 months from the date of sale. She was broken up at Plymouth in November 1815.
