= French ship Brutus =

Three ships of the French Navy have borne the name Brutus in honour of several Roman politicians named Brutus:

- Diadème (1756–1797), the lead ship of the Diadème-class ship of the line, was renamed Brutus on 29 September 1792
- Brutus (1780–1795); naval service 1793–1795, first as an 18-gun corvette and then as a 10-gun brig
- Brutus (1798–1803), a Téméraire-class ship of the line renamed Impétueux shortly after launch in 1803

Note: The Brutus Français, (ex-Pulaski, ex-Pichegru, and frequently referred to in news reports as Brutus), was a French 20-gun privateer operating highly successfully out of Charleston, South Carolina in 1795, in the Caribbean. This was not Brutus (1780–1795) above.
