= HMS Pique (1795) =

Frigate of the Royal Navy

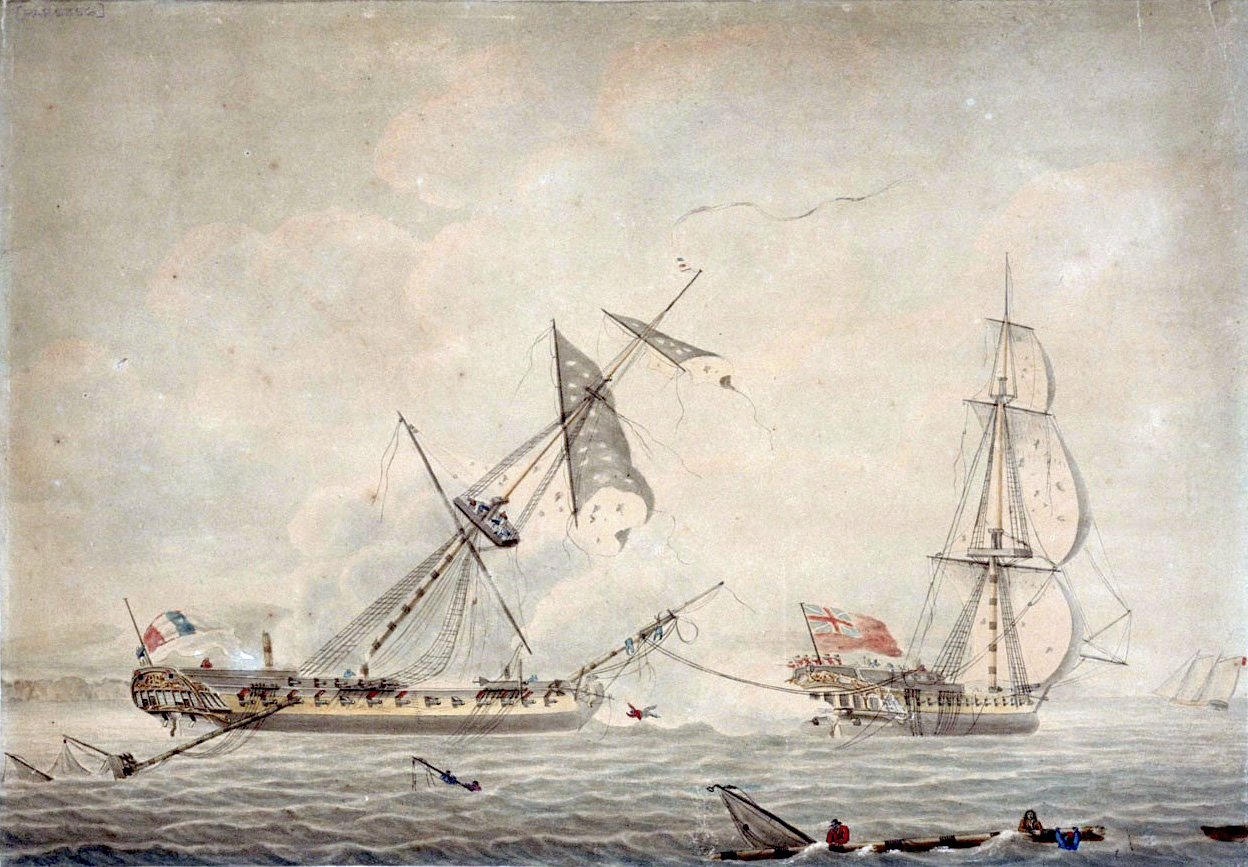
- HMS Blanche tows the captured Pique into port, depicted by Robert Dodd

History

France
- Name: Pique
- Builder: Rochefort
- Laid down: January 1783
- Launched: 2 December 1785
- Completed: By 1786
- Renamed: Built as Fleur-de-Lys; Renamed Pique in June 1792
- Captured: 6 January 1795, by the Royal Navy

Great Britain
- Name: HMS Pique
- Acquired: 1795
- Fate: Wrecked and burned 30 June 1798

General characteristics
- Class & type: Galathée-class frigate
- Displacement: 1,150 tonneaux
- Tons burthen: 600 port tonneaux; 906 21/94 (bm)
- Length: 144 ft 1 1/2 in (43.9 m) (overall); 119 ft 5 1/4 in (36.4 m) (keel)
- Beam: 37 ft 9 1/4 in (11.5 m)
- Depth of hold: 11 ft 8 in (3.6 m)
- Propulsion: Sails
- Sail plan: Full-rigged ship
- Complement: French service; Originally: 150 (peace) and 220 (war); Later:280 and then 322
- Armament: French service; Upper deck: 26 × 12-pounder guns; Spar deck:6 × 6-pounder guns; British service'; Upper deck:26 × 12-pounder guns; QD: 6 × 6-pounder guns + 4 × 24-pounder carronades; Fc: 2 × 6-pounder guns + 2 × 24-pounder carronades

HMS Pique was a 38-gun fifth-rate frigate of the Royal Navy. She had formerly served with the French Navy, initially as the Fleur-de-Lys, and later as the Pique. HMS Blanche captured her in 1795 in a battle that left the Blanche's commander, Captain Robert Faulknor, dead. HMS Pique was taken into service under her only British captain, David Milne, but served for just three years with the Royal Navy before being wrecked in an engagement with the French ship Seine in 1798. The Seine had been spotted heading for a French port and Pique and another British ship gave chase. All three ships ran aground after a long and hard-fought pursuit. The arrival of a third British ship ended French resistance, but while the Seine and Jason were both refloated, attempts to save Pique failed; she bilged and had to be abandoned.

== French career ==
Pique was built at Rochefort as the Fleur-de-Lys, one of the six-ship Galatée class designed by Raymond-Antoine Haran. She was launched on 2 December 1785. The French Revolution led to her being renamed Pique in June 1792.

Between 25 May and 23 December 1792, Pique was under the command of lieutenant de vaisseau d'Ancausse de Labatut. She cruised the environs of Belle Île and Île d'Yeu before returning to Île-d'Aix roads. She then sailed to observe the entrance to the Channel.

From 9 January 1793, Pique was under the command of capitaine de vaisseau d'Ancausse de Labatut in the Île-d'Aix roads. Then under the command of capitaine de vaisseau de Leissègues, between 7 March and 23 November 1793 she carried troops and passengers to the Windward Islands.

On 9 January 1794, Pique was at Rochefort before Leissègues again carried troops and passengers to the Windward Islands.

== Capture ==
Pique encountered HMS Blanche (commanded by Captain Faulknor) off the island of Desirade at Pointe à Pitre, Guadeloupe on 4 January 1795. Pique at first tried to avoid an action, but eventually the two ships came to close quarters in the early hours of 5 January. The two ships closed and exchanged broadsides, with both sustaining heavy damage; Blanche lost her main and mizzen masts. Pique then turned and ran afoul of the Blanche, with her bowsprit caught across her port quarter. While the French made several attempts to board, which were repulsed, the crew of Blanche attempted to lash the bowsprit to their capstan, but during the attempt Captain Faulknor was killed by a musket ball to the heart. Pique then broke away from Blanche and came round her stern, this time colliding on the starboard quarter. Blanche's men quickly lashed the bowsprit to the stump of their mainmast, which held her fast. Pique was now unable to manoeuvre or bring any of her guns to bear on Blanche. After being repeatedly raked by Blanche's guns, Pique surrendered. Casualties for the British were eight killed, including Captain Faulknor, and 21 wounded. Pique had lost 76 killed and 110 wounded. The two ships were joined later that morning by the 64-gun HMS Veteran, which helped exchange and secure the prisoners and tow the ships to port. Blanche towed her prize to a British port, where she was named and registered on 5 September.

== British career ==
HMS Pique was commissioned in September 1795 under Captain David Milne, and assigned to serve in the Leeward Islands. On 9 March 1796, Pique and Charon captured the French privateer Lacédémonienne off Barbados. She was described as a brig of 14 guns and 90 men. The British took her into service. (Note: Prize money was paid in July 1804. The share of a petty officer was worth £2 7s 7d; the share of an able seaman was worth 10s 2d.)

Pique then went on to serve as part a squadron under Captain Thomas Parr in the fourth rate HMS Malabar. She was present at the capture of the Dutch colonies of Demerera and Essequibo on 23 April 1796, and the capture of Berbice on 2 May 1796.

Pique, Babet, Prompte, and Scipio captured the Catherina Christina in July 1796. Pique then returned to Britain and operated in the English Channel from 1797.

Pique shared with Révolutionnaire, Boadicea and the hired armed cutter Nimrod in the capture of the Anna Christiana on 17 May 1798.

While patrolling off the Penmarks on 29 June 1798 she and her consorts Mermaid and Jason came across the French frigate Seine. Seine had crossed the Atlantic from the West Indies and was bound for a French port. The British squadron manoeuvred to cut her off from land, but the Mermaid, under Captain James Newman-Newman, soon lost contact, leaving Pique under Milne and Jason under Captain Charles Stirling, to chase down the Frenchman.

The chase lasted all day, until 11 o'clock at night when Pique was able to range alongside Seine and fire a broadside. The two exchanged fire for several hours, with the lighter Pique suffering considerable damage to her masts and rigging. Jason then ranged up and Captain Stirling called upon Milne to anchor, but Milne did not hear and was determined to see Seine captured, and pressed on. Before the battle could be resumed, Pique ran suddenly aground. Jason too ran aground before she could swing way, while Seine was observed to have grounded, and lost all her masts in the process. As the tide rose, Seine was able to swing into a position to rake the two British ships. With difficulty, the sailors of Jason dragged several guns to the bow in order to exchange fire, while Pique was able to bring her foremost guns to bear. Under fire from both British ships, the appearance on the scene of Mermaid convinced the French to surrender. Jason had lost seven killed and 12 wounded, while Pique sustained casualties of two killed and six wounded. Seine however had 170 killed and 100 wounded.

== Fate ==
Mermaid arrived and retrieved Jason, but Pique had bilged and had to be destroyed. St Fiorenzo too arrived and was instrumental in recovering Seine. The Royal Navy took Seine into service under her existing name.
