= La Tranche-sur-Mer =

- Commune
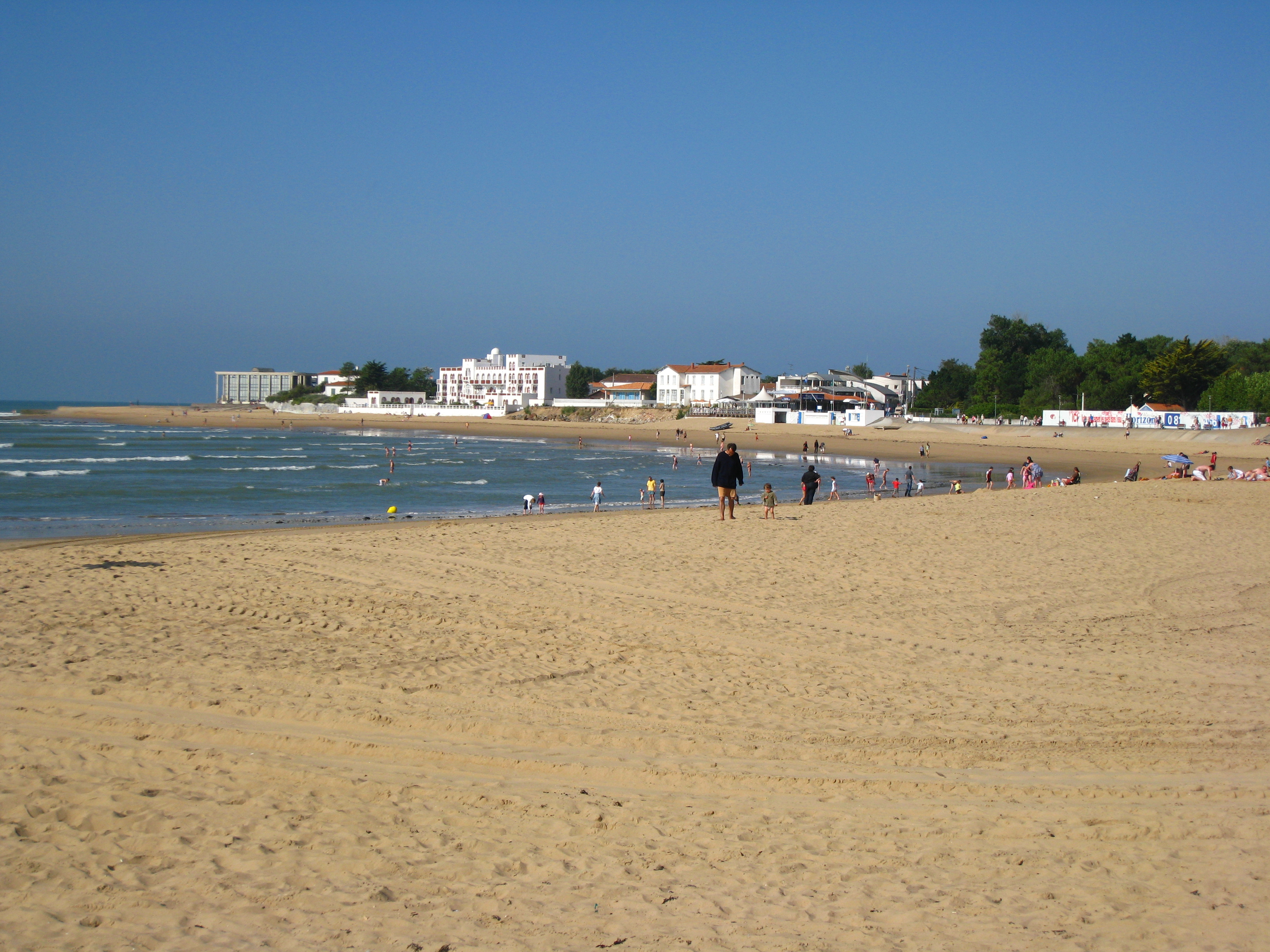
- The beach at La Tranche-sur-Mer

- Coat of arms
- Location of La Tranche-sur-Mer
- Location within France Location within Pays de la Loire
- Coordinates: 46°20′38″N 1°26′18″W
- Country: France
- Region: Pays de la Loire
- Department: Vendée
- Arrondissement: Les Sables-d'Olonne
- Canton: Mareuil-sur-Lay-Dissais

Government
  - Mayor (2020–2026): Serge Kubryk
- Area^{1}: 17.63 km^{2} (6.81 sq mi)
- Highest elevation: 25 m (82 ft)
- Lowest elevation: 0 m (0 ft)
- Population (2023): 3,136
  - Density: 177.9/km^{2} (460.7/sq mi)
- Time zone: UTC+01:00 (CET)
  - Summer (DST): UTC+02:00 (CEST)
- INSEE/Postal code: 85294 /85360
- ^{1} French Land Register data, which excludes lakes, ponds, glaciers > 1 km^{2} (0.386 sq mi or 247 acres) and river estuaries.

La Tranche-sur-Mer (French pronunciation: [la tʁɑ̃ʃ syʁ mɛʁ], literally La Tranche on Sea) is a commune in the Vendée department in the Pays de la Loire region in western France.

The final stages of the action of 30 June 1798, during which all three combatant frigates grounded, was fought just off the harbour.

== Population ==
Historical population
Year	Pop.	±% p.a.
1968	2,040	—
1975	2,125	+0.58%
1982	2,071	−0.37%
1990	2,065	−0.04%
1999	2,510	+2.19%
2007	2,673	+0.79%
2012	2,762	+0.66%
2017	2,905	+1.01%
2023	3,136	+1.28%
Source: INSEE

== See also ==
- Communes of the Vendée department
