= French brig Brave (1793) =

Brave
History

France
- Name: Cannoniere No. 1
- Builder: Le Havre, to a design by Pierre-Alexandre-Laurent Forfait
- Laid down: January 1793
- Launched: 26 April 1793
- Renamed: Brave (March 1793); Arrogante (May 1795)
- Captured: 25 April 1798

Great Britain
- Name: HMS Arrogante
- Acquired: 1798, by capture
- Renamed: HMS Insolent
- Honours and awards: Naval General Service Medal with clasp "Basque Roads 1809"
- Fate: Sold 1816

General characteristics
- Type: Initially: Corvette-canonnière; May 1795: Canonnière; British service: gun-brig; 1811: Brig-sloop
- Displacement: 288 tons (French)
- Tons burthen: 25814/94 (bm)
- Length: 91 ft 9 in (27.97 m) (overall); 72 ft 1 in (21.97 m) (keel)
- Beam: 25 ft 11 3/8 in (7.909 m)
- Depth of hold: 11 ft 2 in (3.40 m)
- Complement: French service: 94; British service: 55 (85 as brig-sloop)
- Armament: Initially: 4 × 24-pounder guns; At capture: 6 × 24-pounder guns; Gun-brig: 2 × 18-pounder guns + 10 × 32-pounder carronades; Brig-sloop: 2 × 6-pounder guns + 12 × 24-pounder carronades

Brave, launched at Le Havre in 1793, was the name vessel of a two-vessel class of brig-rigged canonnières, i.e., gun-brigs. The French Navy renamed her Arrogante in May 1795. The Royal Navy captured her on 23 or 24 April 1798. The British Royal Navy took her into service as HMS Arrogante, but renamed her HMS Insolent some four months later. She was sold in June 1818.

== French career ==
As the corvette-canonnière Brave, she was stationed at the Bay of Audierne. Between 4 February 1793 and 7 August she was under the command of sous-lieutenant de vaisseau (later lieutenant de vaisseau) Massard and escorted convoys between Le Havre and Brest. From 27 August to 25 October she was under the command of enseigne de vaisseau non entretenu Bourhis.

Between 11 April 1794 and 28 July she was stationed first at Verdon and then at the Gironde estuary. There she carried dispatches from Brest to Verdon.

Still under Bourhis's command, between 13 May 1795 to 8 July, Brave sailed from Brest à Audierne, where she then was stationed in the bay, before returning to Brest. Next she was at Camaret roads, and then escorted a transport from le Conquet to Brest.

In May 1795 the French Navy renamed Brave to Arrogante, and changed her classification from corvette-canonnière to canonnière.

On 21 April 1796 Arrogante was under the command of lieutenant de vaisseau Le Bastard when she engaged a British squadron in the Audierne roads. On 25 July 1797 she was at Brest and still under Le Bastard's command.

Almost exactly two years later, on 23 April 1798 Arrogante was under the command of lieutenant de vaisseau Lambour and escorting a convoy between Audierne and Brest. French records report that while she was in the Iroise Sea she encountered two English frigates, HMS Jason and HMS Naiad.

== Capture ==
British records report that Naiad, Mars and Ramillies were in sight when Jason captured Arrogante. Arrogante was armed with six long 24-pounder guns and had a crew of 92 men.

== British career ==
The Royal Navy took her into service as HMS Arrogante. She arrived at Plymouth in April 1798 and she sat there. In August, the Navy renamed her HMS Insolent, but did not refit her until February to April 1801. On 24 April Lieutenant Burians, a veteran officer, commissioned her. (Note: Burians was the father of Captain Burians, who was in command of the hired armed ship Earl of Oxford.) (Note: Admiralty records report that Arrogante's captain was William Bevians. However, her captain drowned in 1801, and Bevians went on to have a long career in the Navy.)

On 21 July 1801, Jason wrecked off the coast near Saint-Malo. Some nine days later Captain Charles Cunningham of Clyde, who commanded the small British flotilla off the coast and had just found out about the wrecking, on 1 August sent Weazel to inquire about the crew of Jason. The French in Saint-Malo informed the British that the crew were all prisoners, and that the French were willing to release them on parole. On 3 August three cutters flying the cartel flag brought out Jason's crew. Although Jason was lying on her side, masts gone, and water breaking over her, Cunningham decided to destroy her to prevent the French from recovering her.

The boats of Weazel went in on 5 August despite strong opposition from shore batteries and various armed small craft, though the larger French vessels in the harbour did not sortie. The first attempt to set Jason on fire failed. A second attempt the next day was successful as the boats from Weazel, Insolent, and Liberty diverted French attention. On 5 October Cunningham received the news of peace with France.

Later, in October, one of Insolent's boats hit a rock, with the result that her captain and three seamen drowned. The purser's daughter was on the boat and one of the seaman swam for the shore, carrying her on his back. As he swam her clothes became sodden and he informed the young woman that unless she agreed to let him remove her clothes he could not carry her further. She refused, stating that she preferred to die than compromise her virtue. He swam on for a bit with her, still clothed, on his back, but eventually, exhausted, he had to let her go and watch her drown.

In 1802 she came under the command of Lieutenant N. Hartwright, at Milford. On 1 December Insolent went into Barnpool from Hamoaze, where she had been refitted. The next day a gale of wind drove a flush of sea over the bridge of St. Nicholas and Redding Point pushed Insolent towards the rocks under Mount Edgecumbe before she was brought up in safety. At some point Hartwright paid her off.

In January 1803 Lieutenant William Smith (2nd), recommissioned her at Guernsey. On 21 May Insolent captured the French ship Centaure. Centaur arrived at Plymouth on 23 May. She had sailed from Havre de Grace with provisions, shot, and shells, all bound for Brest.

Insolent''s copper was replaced in January 1805 at Guernsey. In May Lieutenant Row Morris replaced Smith.

On 7 March 1807 Insolent came into Plymouth carrying French prisoners, which she landed at Mill Bay. The Naval Chronicle reports that as boat carrying the French prisoners paused for them to rest on their oars, Hibernia glided majestically by, causing the prisoners to exclaim, "There goes the coup de grace for Bounaparte".

On 25 August Morris sailed Insolent to the Mediterranean.

In early July 1808, Insolent detained and sent into Plymouth the Augustus, of New York, Hurdle, master. Augustus had sailed from Canton, China, in early February.

Insolent was present at the battle of Basque Roads, which took place on 11 April 1809. (Note: Head money was paid in March 1819. An ordinary seaman received 13 shillings; a first-class share was worth £86 13s 2¼d.) In 1847 the Admiralty authorized the issuance of the Naval General Service Medal with clasp "Basque Roads 1809" to all surviving British participants in the battle.

On 9 June 1809 Insolent captured the French lugger Union. Six days later Insolent captured the brig Juno; the schooner Arrow was in sight. The gun-brig Martial was in sight. Ten days after that Insolent, Conflict, and Arrow were in company when they captured the French brig Amitaire. On 8 August, Insolent captured the French chasse maree Marie.

From October 1809 to September 1810, Insolent was at Plymouth, undergoing a large repair. The Admiralty rerated her as a brig-sloop and commissioned her for the North Sea and the Baltic in October 1810 under the command of Commander Edward Brazier.

Under Brazier's command, Insolent captured two chasse marees, Providence (20 September 1812), and Trois Freres (23 January 1813).

In April 1812, Insolent captured a French privateer rowboat, armed with swivel guns, and sent her into Dover.

A gale on Sunday 18 October that continued to the next morning damaged many vessels. Insolent, for one, was driven ashore at Swansea.

In December 1812 Commander John Forbes replaced Brazier.

On 26 April 1814, Insolent was in company with Hamadryad and Cracker when they captured the Euranie. (Note: A first-class share of the prize money was worth £15 2s 5d; a sixth-class share, that of an ordinary seaman, was worth 3s 9d.)

Insolent was among the vessels in the Channel Fleet under the command of Vice Admiral Lord Keith from 1812 to 1814, and so qualifying for a share of the Parliamentary grant for her services. (Note: The money was paid in three tranches, and separately for 1812, 1813 and 1814, and services in the Gironde. Insolent qualified for the payments for 1812, and 1813 and 1814. A first class share for service in 1812 was £45 3s 11d; a sixth-class share was worth 13 s 4½d.)

In June 1814 Commander William Kelly replaced Forbes for North America.

== Fate ==
Insolent was paid off at Deptford in 1815. The Principal Officers and Commissioners of His Majesty's Navy offered the "Insolent gun-brig, of 258 tons", lying at Deptford for sale on 11 June 1818. She was sold for £860 on that day to J. Crystall.
