= HMS Cracker (1804) =

Brig of the Royal Navy

History

United Kingdom
- Name: HMS Cracker
- Ordered: 9 January 1804
- Builder: Thomas Pitcher, Northfleet
- Laid down: April 1804
- Launched: 30 June 1804
- Fate: Sold 1816 for breaking up

General characteristics
- Tons burthen: 1805/94 (bm)
- Length: Overall: 80 ft 0 in (24.38 m); Keel: 65 ft 10 5/8 in (20.1 m)
- Beam: 22 ft 8 in (6.91 m)
- Depth of hold: 9 ft 5 in (2.87 m)
- Complement: 50
- Armament: 10 × 18-pounder carronades + 2 chase guns

HMS Cracker was a later Archer-class gun brig, launched in 1804. She participated in several actions and captured two small French privateers. She was sold for breaking up in 1816.

== Career ==
Lieutenant William Henry Douglas commissioned Cracker in July 1804.

Cracker was in company with Champion, Merlin, and the hired armed cutters Frances and Nelson on 16 April at the capture of Charlotte Christina.

On 23 July 1805, Cracker engaged a division of French gun-vessels that were sailing from Fecamp to Boulogne.

In October 1805 Lieutenant John Leach replaced Douglas. On 20 June 1808 Cracker was sailing off the coast of Suffolk when Leach sighted a large lug sail boat, fitted for 16 oars. He gave chase and after four hours captured her. She was the French privateer Été, with a crew of 22 men armed with small arms. She was under the command of Captain Louis Pequandiere, and though off St Vallery en Caux, was two days out of Dunkirk. She had not captured any prizes but had been hovering near five British merchant vessels when Cracker had arrived on the scene.

On 25 February 1806 Cracker recaptured Dove.

Cracker was in company with Diamond, Naiad, and Clinker when they captured the ship William Little, John J. P. Champlin, master, on 17 October 1806. (Note: A petty officer's share of the prize money was 17s 4d; a seaman's share was 4s 4d.)

On 2 January 1807 Cracker recaptured the brig Resolution, of Exeter.

On 11 April 1807 Cracker and Emulous recaptured Rochdale.

On 25 April 1808, HMS Skylark captured the French privateer Furet, which was pierced for 14 guns but only had six on board. Furet and her crew of 48 men were two days out from Boulogne and had not made any captures. Cracker was in company with Skylark. (Note: This may be the Furet from Boulogne, commissioned in the summer of 1808. She was first under Jean-Baptiste-Benjamin Levillain, and later under Jacques-Antoine Altazan (or Altazin), but there are some discrepancies between the British and French records making identification uncertain.)

Cracker participated in the unsuccessful Walcheren Expedition, which took place between 30 July and 9 August 1809. On 13 August she was part of a squadron under Sir Home Riggs Popham that pushed up the West Scheld, but saw no action. The squadron's task was to sound the river and place buoys to permit the larger vessels to navigate the river safely. Daring was at the siege of Flushing, and was instrumental in saving the brigs Reynard and Cracker after they had grounded within point-blank shot of the enemy.

She was among the myriad vessels listed as qualifying for the prize money from the campaign.

On 23 April 1810, Cracker, John Leach, commander, recaptured two colliers the brigs Hawke and Atlas.

Later in 1810 Lieutenant Henry Fyge Jauncey replaced Leach. On 20 November Cracker captured a small French privateer. The privateer was the lugger Diana (or Diani), of four guns and 22 men. She had left Dunkirk the day before and had not taken any prizes. Jauncey was promoted to the rank of commander on 1 February 1812. (Note: French records show Diane as a 23-ton privateer commissioned in Dunkirk in 1810. She was pierced for four, but armed with only two guns. She had a crew of 24 to 28 men under Pierre-Nicolas Delille.)

On 1 April 1811 Cracker seized Elizabeth, of Aldborough. On the 28th she seized a galley, from Deal, of unknown name, and on 16 May 263 kegs of spirits and four anchors.

On 19 October Cracker captured a smuggling boat with tubs of alcohol onboard. On 27 October Cracker provided assistance to the merchant vessel Beaver. The owners gave Cracker's crew £50 in thanks.

On 17 December Cracker provided assistance to the East Indiaman Tigris. (Note: A first-class share of the salvage money was worth £91 17s 1 3/4d; a sixth-class share, that of an ordinary seaman, was worth £3 4s 0 3/4d.)

In February 1812 Lieutenant Michael Fitton took command of Cracker for service in the North Sea and Baltic. Cracker captured the American ship America on 1 August. Then on 26 August, Fitton captured the American ship Dido, and shared the prize money, by agreement, with Gallant. (Note: A first-class share of the prize money was worth £418 3s 9d; a sixth-class share, that of an ordinary seaman, was worth £24 13s 7d.)

On 26 April 1814, Cracker was in company with Hamadryad and Insolent when they captured Euranie. (Note: A first-class share of the prize money was worth £15 2s 5d; a sixth-class share, that of an ordinary seaman, was worth 3s 9d.)

== Fate ==
The "Principal Officers and Commissioners of His Majesty's Navy" first offered the "Cracker gun brig, of 180 tons", "Lying at Portsmouth", for sale on 23 March 1815. Cracker was sold at Portsmouth for £750 on 23 November 1815 for breaking up.
