= HMS Coureur =

Three vessels of the Royal Navy have borne the name HMS Coureur, or HMS Coureuse, after the French for "runner" (masculine and feminine, respectively):

== Coureur ==
- HMS Coureur (1778) was a French lugger that Jacques and Daniel Denys built at Dunkirk and launched on 8 May 1776. Alert, under the command of Lieutenant William George Fairfax, engaged and captured her on 17 June 1778, in advance of the declaration of war. In the engagement Coureur, under the command of Enseigne de Rosily, had five men killed and seven wounded out of her crew of 50. Alert had four men wounded, two mortally. The British took Coureur into the Royal Navy under her existing name. She was under the command of Lieutenant Christopher Major on 21 June 1780 when two American privateers, the Fortune and the Griffin, captured her outside Bonavista Bay after an action that cost her three men killed and four wounded. The Americans put Major and 30 of his men aboard Griffin, which fell prey the next day to Fairy.
- HMS Coureur (1798) was a French navy corvette, lent to merchants to serve as a privateer of the same name but under the command of French naval officers. In November 1793 she was on a mission to Île de France under Lieutenant de vaisseaux Garaud. On 22 October the following year, HMS Centurion and HMS Diomede fought an action with the 44-gun French frigates Prudente and Cybèle, plus the 22-gun Jean-Bart and 14-gun Courrier off Île de France. Jason captured her on 24 February 1798. At the time of her capture, Coureur was armed with 24 guns and had a crew of 150 men. The Royal Navy named and registered her on 1 June, but never commissioned her. She was put up for sale as "Coureur 355 tons burthen" in August 1801, and sold at Plymouth for £1,400 on 14 September.

== Coureuse ==
- HMS Coureuse (1795) was a schooner launched in 1785 or 1788 in the United States that the French acquired and armed at Lorient in 1794. Pomone captured her in 1795. Coureuse was sold in April 1799.
