= HMS Vengeance (1800) =

French and UK naval sailing frigate 1794–1814

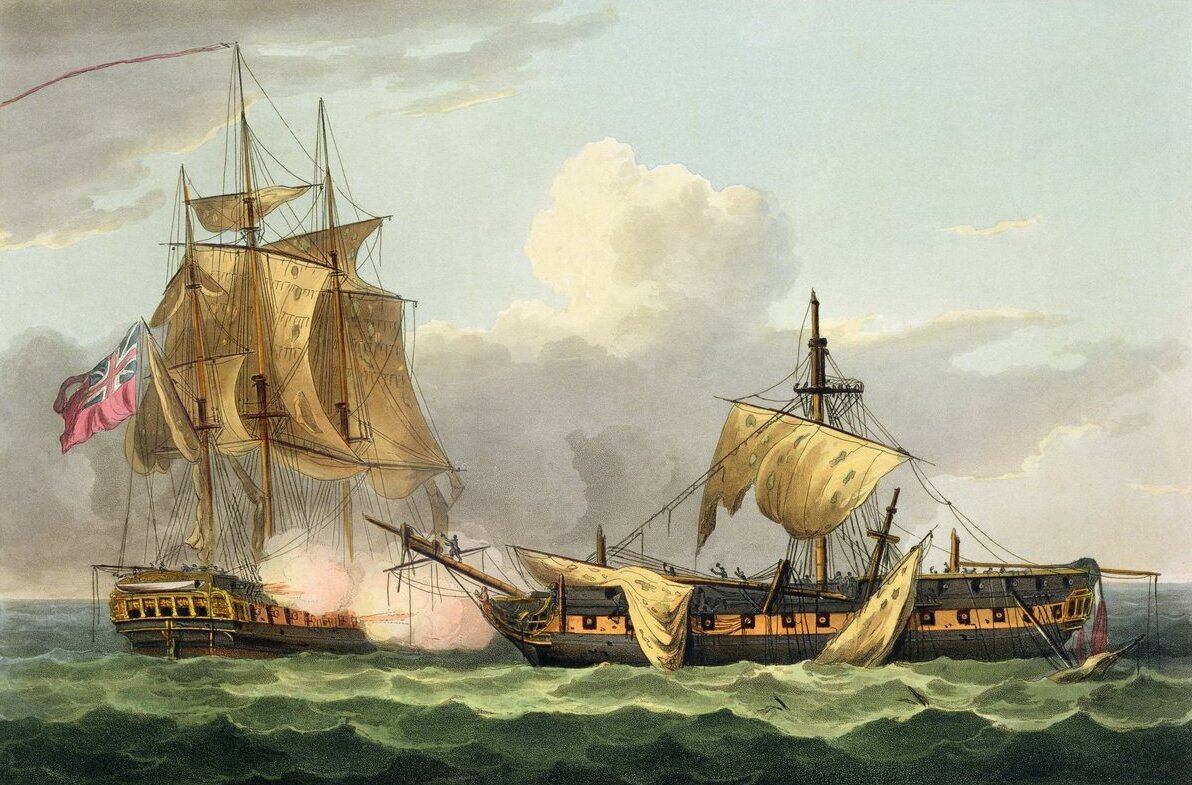
- HMS Seine captures Vengeance on 20 August 1800, depicted in a print by Thomas Whitcombe

History

France
- Name: Vengeance
- Builder: Paimbœuf
- Laid down: June 1793
- Launched: 8 November 1794
- Completed: By April 1795
- Captured: 20 August 1800, by the Royal Navy

Great Britain
- Name: HMS Vengeance
- Acquired: 20 August 1800
- Fate: Possibly broken up in 1803; May have remained in service until 1814

General characteristics
- Class & type: 48-gun Vengeance-class frigate
- Tons burthen: 1,180 bm
- Length: 160 ft 6 in (48.9 m) (overall); 134 ft 9 in (41.1 m) (keel)
- Beam: 40 ft 6 in (12.3 m)
- Depth of hold: 13 ft 3 1/2 in (4.1 m)
- Sail plan: Full-rigged ship
- Armament: 28 × 18-pounder long guns

HMS Vengeance was originally the 48-gun French Navy frigate Vengeance and lead ship of her class. She engaged USS Constellation during the Quasi-War, in an inconclusive engagement that left both ships heavily damaged. During the French Revolutionary Wars, HMS Seine hunted Vengeance down and captured her after a sharp action. She was recommissioned in the Royal Navy as the 38-gun fifth rate HMS Vengeance, but the British apparently never returned her to seagoing service. Accounts are divided as to her eventual fate. She may have been broken up in 1803 after grounding in 1801, or continued as a prison ship until 1814.

== Construction ==
Vengeance was one of two frigates built to Pierre Degay's design of 1793, initially ordered as Bonne Foi, and launched on 8 November 1794. She was a member of one of the larger classes of frigate, armed with 24-pounders.

== French career ==
On 8 August 1796, off Guadeloupe, Vengeance encountered the 32-gun Mermaid, under the command of Captain Robert Waller Otway. The subsequent action was prolonged but indecisive. When the 40-gun British frigate Beaulieu came up, Vengeance retired to the shelter of the batteries of Basseterre. Mermaid had suffered no casualties; Vengeance had lost 12 killed and 26 wounded.

Within the month, on 25 August, Vengeance again engaged the British when she chased the 26-gun Raison, under Captain John Poo Beresford, to the west of the Gulf of Maine. After the vessels had exchanged fire for two hours, foggy weather helped Raison escape, but not before she had suffered three killed and six wounded. Vengeance suffered six killed and an unknown number of wounded.

On 15-16 November 1799, she, with corvette Berceau, weighed anchor at Île-d'Aix to transport three (Govt.?) agents to Guadeloupe. They anchored that evening in the roads of Chaix de Bois and left the next morning. On 11 December, she anchored at Basse-Terre, Guadeloupe, along with Berceau, and the agents went ashore.

=== Vengeance vs Constellation ===
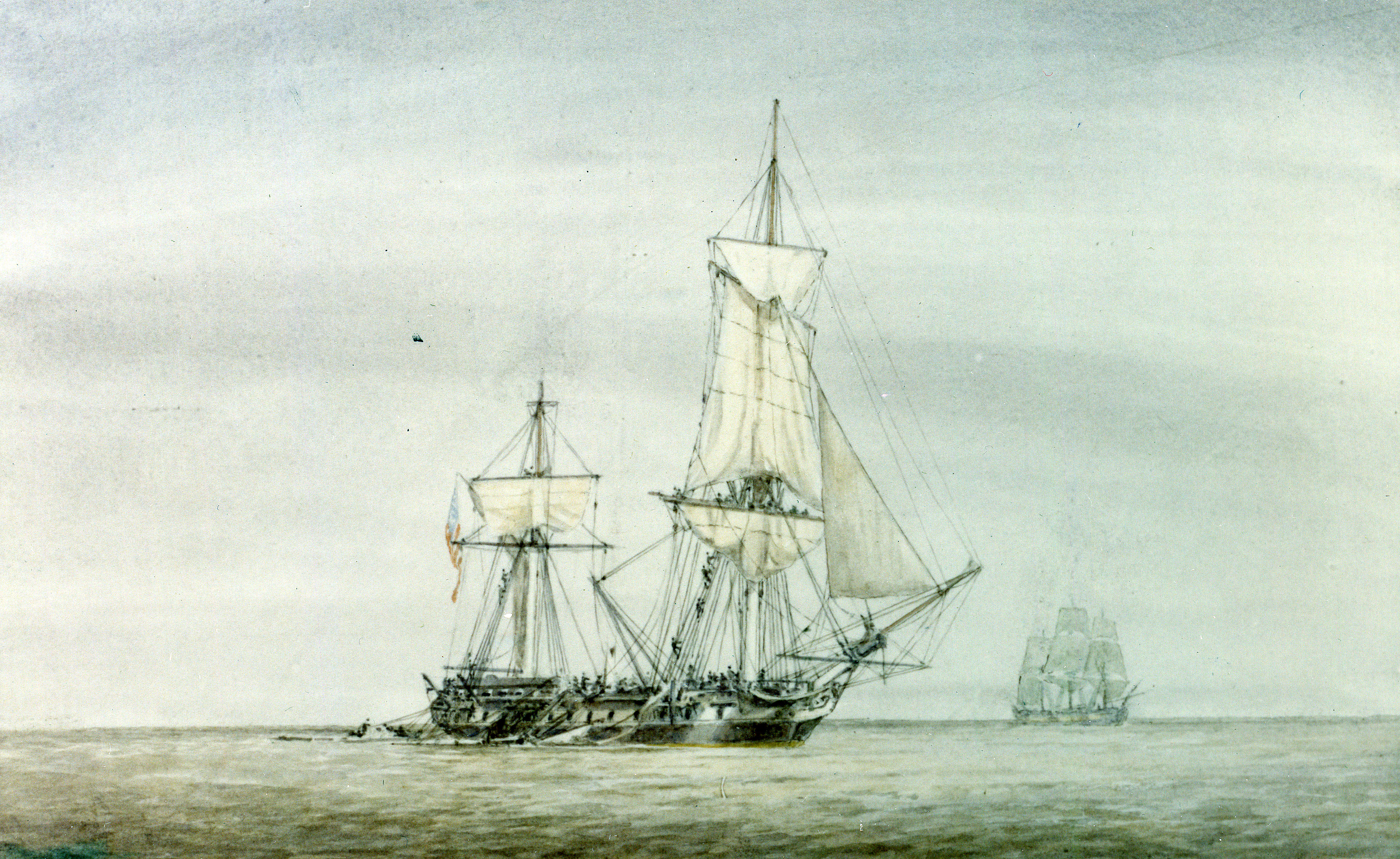
Vengeance engaging USS Constellation

On 31 January 1800, during the Quasi-War, Vengeance engaged the USS Constellation. Toll reports that Vengeance had a broadside of 559 pounds compared to the American vessel's 372 pounds. Troude reports her armament as twenty-six 18-pounders, ten 6-pounders and four 36-pounder carronades (336 pound broadside), compared to Constellation's twenty-eight 18-pounders, ten 12-pounders and one 32-pounder carronade (472 pound broadside).

Constellation had sailed under Captain Thomas Truxtun from Saint Kitts on 30 January, and came across Vengeance the following day. Vengeance was bound for France under Capitaine de Vaisseau François Pitot, carrying passengers and specie, and initially attempted to outrun Constellation. Truxton gave chase, and eventually came within range during the evening. Before dawn, Vengeance hoisted her flag, and Constellation answered with a red-tailed flag and a blue jack that the French did not understand. After Pitot refused a request to surrender, the two began to exchange broadsides at (15°17′N 66°04′W), with Vengeance aiming high to damage Constellation's rigging. Constellation eluded Pitot's attempts to board her, around 9:00 and again around 11:00.

The action lasted until one o'clock the following morning, having been fought in poor light, with the ships often ill defined shapes to each other. Vengeance's and Constellation's guns eventually fell silent; Toll reports that Pitot may even have struck his colours but Constellation had suffered considerable damage to her masts and rigging, eventually losing her main mast at the conclusion of the action around half past midnight. The two ships drifted apart while the Americans repaired their damage. The Americans believed Vengeance had sunk, but her captain actually had managed to sail her as far as Curaçao, where he ran her onto the beach to prevent her from sinking on 6 February. Estimates of French casualties ran to 160, while Constellation had 15 killed and 25 wounded. Pitot recorded that his guns had fired 742 rounds during the action, while Constellation had fired 1,129. According to Troude, Constellation never identified herself.

=== Capture ===
The French repaired Vengeance and returned her to service. She was reported as ready to sail by 2 August, 1800. Then on 20 August 1800 the frigate HMS Seine, under the command of Captain David Milne, attacked her just before Midnight in the Mona Passage. Both ships sustained heavy casualties; 13 crew were killed aboard Seine, 29 were wounded, and the ship was cut up. Vengeance, still under the command of Pitot, sustained worse damage and surrendered after about an hour and a half of hard fighting in the morning of 21 August. One source estimates that Vengeance suffered some 35 men killed and some 70 wounded before she struck.

At the time of her capture Vengeance was armed with twenty-eight 18-pounders on her main deck, sixteen 12-pounders and eight 42-pounder carronades on her quarterdeck and forecastle, brass swivel guns on the gunwale, and shifting guns on the main and quarter decks. All these measures were in French pounds. In English measures the broadsides in this case were 498 pounds for Seine and 434 for Vengeance. Crew sizes were 281 men and 326 men (One report said Vengeance had only 165 crew when she departed Curacao), respectively. (Note: Clowes reports that each ship appears to have fought with an extra gun firing from a normally empty port on the engaged side. He also mentions a French account that gives Vengeance only 40 guns and a broadside of 377 pounds.) Troude attributes to Vengeance an armament of twenty-six 18-pounders, ten 8-pounders and four 36-pounder carronades, totalling a broadside of 346 pounds.

The naval historian William James subsequently exaggerated the engagement in favour of the French. He declared that as Seine had done what Constellation could not, British naval forces were "more potent than American thunder". In 1847 the Admiralty awarded the Naval General Service Medal with clasp "Seine 20 Augt. 1800" to any surviving crew members of Seine that came forward to claim it.

== British career ==
Vengeance was re-armed with 18-pounders but not initially commissioned. After Galgo foundered in 1800, with heavy loss of life, the Admiralty issued an order stopping the purchase of captured enemy warships.

Still, the Navy did eventually buy her. Having been damaged by grounding in 1801, she became a receiving ship at Portsmouth. Some records indicate that she was then broken up in 1803; others suggest that she served as a prison ship until 1814.

The National Maritime Museum reports that she was commissioned as a prison ship at Portsmouth in 1808 under Lieutenant A. Gilmour. Lieutenant J. Graves, who served until 1811, replaced him in 1810. Lieutenant G. King commanded her in 1813, and Lieutenant J. Graves commanded her in 1814.
