= Tigris (1802 ship) =

English ship used from 1803 to 1815

History

United Kingdom
- Name: Tigris
- Namesake: Tigris
- Owner: EIC voyages 1–2:Thomas Hurry; EIC voyages 3–5:Robert Livie; EIC voyage no.6:A. Thomson
- Builder: Francis Hurry, Newcastle-upon-Tyne
- Launched: 27 April 1802, or 1803
- Fate: Wrecked 4 December 1823

General characteristics
- Tons burthen: 525, or 527, or 535, or 554, or 55454/94, or 555 (bm)
- Length: Overall:122 ft 6 in (37.3 m); Keel:97 ft 10 in (29.8 m)
- Beam: 31 ft 10 in (9.7 m)
- Depth of hold: 14 ft 7 in (4.4 m)
- Complement: 1803: 50; 1807: 50
- Armament: 1803: 16 × 12-pounder guns; 1807: 16 × 12-pounder guns; 1815:4 guns

Tigris was launched in Newcastle-upon-Tyne in 1802. She made six voyages between 1803 and 1815 as an "extra ship" for the British East India Company (EIC). After her stint as an East Indiaman, Tigris became a West Indiaman. She was wrecked in December 1823.

== East Indiaman ==
Tigris first appeared in Lloyd's Register (LR) in 1803 as "Tigress".

Year	Master	Owner	Trade	Source
1803	Graham	Hurry	London–India	LR

On 1 April 1803, the EIC contracted with Thomas Hurry for Tigris to perform six voyages at a peace time freight rate of £13 10s per ton for 525 tons.

Tigris made two voyages under the command of Captain Charles Graham. War with France had broken out and he acquired a letter of marque on 3 June 1803.

1st EIC voyage (1803–1804): Captain Charles Graham sailed from Portsmouth on 30 June 1803, bound for Bengal. Tigris reached Madeira on 17 July and Saugor on 5 December. She arrived at Calcutta on 19 December. Homeward bound, she was Diamond Harbour on 25 March 1804, to load; she sailed on 22 June. She reached St Helena on 1 October and arrived at the Downs on 8 December.

2nd EIC voyage (1805–1807): Captain Graham sailed on 31 August 1805 from Cork, bound for Madras and Bengal. On 29 September Tigris was at Madeira. On 22 November she was at Ferdinand de Noronha, intending to sail the next day for Madras; she was in company with Ann. On 2 March 1806 she reached Madras and on 5 April she arrived at Diamond Harbour. Homeward bound, she was at Saugor on 25 September, Madras on 9 October, and Trincomalee on 18 October. She reached the Cape on 26 December and St Helena on 23 January 1807, and arrived 12 April at the Downs. She returned to London on 15 April 1807.

Tigris made four voyages under the command of Captain Dugald MacDougall. He had acquired a letter of marque on 30 June 1807.

3rd EIC voyage (1807–1809): Captain MacDougal sailed from Portsmouth on 17 September 1807, bound for Madeira, Madras, and Bengal. Tigris reached Madeira, and on 18 December she was at the Cape. She reached Madras on 5 April 1800 and arrived at Calcutta on 18 May. Homeward bound, she left Saugor on 3 October. She was at Madras on 17 October. On 19 January 1809, she was back at the Cape. She reached St Helena on 24 February and arrived at the Downs on 21 May.

4th EIC voyage (1810–1811): Captain MacDougal and Tigris sailed on 14 March 1810, from Portsmouth, bound for Madras and Bengal. On 8 July Tigris reached Madras and on 29 July she arrived at Calcutta. On 10 November she left Bengal and was at St Helena on 28 January 1811. She arrived back at the Downs on 3 April.

5th EIC voyage (1811–1813): Tigris and Captain MacDougal sailed for St Helena and Bengal in October 1811. However, on 24 October she got on the Pan Sand near Margate. She was lightened and got off, but had to return to the Thames for repairs. On 17 December HMS Cracker provided assistance to Tigris. (Note: A first-class share of the salvage money was worth £91 17s 1 3/4d; a sixth-class share, that of an ordinary seaman, was worth £3 4s 0 3/4d.) On 19 December Tigris had to put back to Margate Roads, having lost anchors and cables. She sailed from Torbay on 4 January 1812. She reached St Helena on 2 April and arrived at Calcutta on 13 July. Homeward bound, she left Saugor on 25 October, reached St Helena on 9 January 1813, and arrived at the Downs on 14 May. She arrived in London on 18 May 1813.

6th EIC voyage (1814–1815): Captain MacDougal sailed from Portsmouth on 8 June 1814, bound for Madeira and Bombay. Tigris reached Madeira on 23 June, and arrived at Bombay on 19 November. Homeward bound, she as at Tellicherry on 10 January 1815, Point de Galle on 25 January, and the Cape on 27 March. She reached St Helena on 25 April and arrived at the Downs on 23 June. She returned to London on 26 June.

== West Indiaman ==
In 1815 Tigris was sold and her new owners employed her as a West Indiaman. She entered Lloyd's Register (LR) in 1815 both as Tigress and Tigris.

Name	Burthen	Launch year	Launch place	Master	Owner	Trade	Notes
Tigress	555	1803	Newcastle	J.Sisk	Captain & Co.	London–Jamaica	Thorough repair 1812
Tigris	555	1803	Newcastle	M.Sisk	Thomson	London–Jamaica	Repair 1810

Year	Master	Owner	Trade	Source & notes
1816	M.Sisk	A.Thomson	London–Jamaica	LR; thorough repair 1812
1818	M.Sisk	A.Thomson	London–Jamaica	LR; thorough repair 1812
1823	M.Sisk; Fotheringham	Thompson	London–Jamaica; London–St Helena	LR; thorough repair 1812 & small repairs 1821

== Fate ==
On 4 December 1823 Tigris, Fotheringham, master, wrecked off Tynemouth in a gale. Her Second Officer and boatswain lost their lives. She had been sailing from London to Shields.
