= HMS Jason (1794) =

Frigate of the Royal Navy

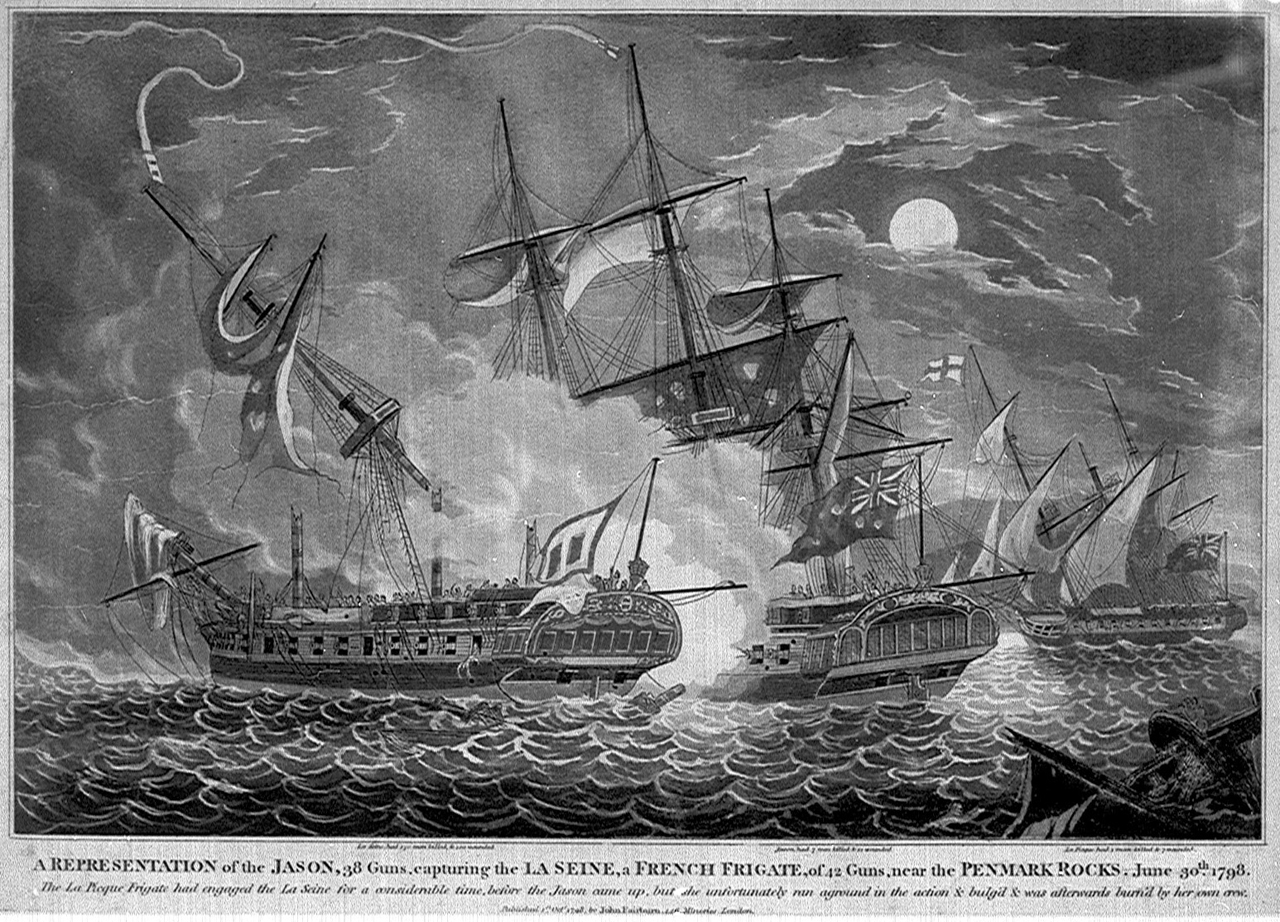
- HMS Jason captures Seine on 30 June 1798, depicted in a contemporary engraving

History

Great Britain
- Name: HMS Jason
- Ordered: 1 April 1793
- Builder: John Dudman, Deptford
- Laid down: April 1793
- Launched: 3 April 1794
- Completed: 25 July 1794
- Commissioned: May 1794
- Fate: Wrecked on 13 October 1798

General characteristics
- Class & type: 38-gun Artois-class fifth-rate frigate
- Tons burthen: 997 64/94 (bm)
- Length: 146 ft 3 in (44.6 m) (overall); 121 ft 9 in (37.1 m) (keel)
- Beam: 39 ft 3 in (12.0 m)
- Depth of hold: 13 ft 9 in (4.19 m)
- Propulsion: Sails
- Sail plan: Full-rigged ship
- Complement: 270
- Armament: UD: 28 × 18-pounder guns; QD: 2 × 9-pounder guns + 12 × 32-pounder carronades; Fc: 2 × 9-pounder bow chasers + 2 × 32-pounder carronades.

HMS Jason was a 38-gun Artois-class fifth-rate frigate of the Royal Navy. She served during the French Revolutionary Wars, but her career came to an end after just four years in service when she struck an uncharted rock off Brest and sank on 13 October 1798. She had already had an eventful career, and was involved in several engagements with French vessels.

== Construction ==
Jason was ordered on 1 April 1793 and was laid down that month at the yards of John Dudman, at Deptford. She was launched on 3 April 1794 and had been completed at Deptford Dockyard by 25 July 1794. She cost £16,632 to build; this rising to a total of £22,567 when the cost of fitting her for service was included. Jason was commissioned in May 1794 under her first commander, Captain James Douglas.

== Career ==
Jason initially served in the English Channel, at first under Douglas, and then by 1795 under Captain Charles Stirling. Stirling remained the Jason's commander for the rest of her career. In a highly active career against French shipping he took at least six French vessels, including two that later became part of the Royal Navy.

Jason was present at the Quiberon expedition in October 1795 as part of John Borlase Warren's squadron, and went on to be highly active against French privateers and raiders. In December 1796 she was part of the British squadron that frustrated the French Expédition d'Irlande, capturing the disarmed frigate Suffren. Further service in the Channel followed; Jason captured the 14-gun privateer Marie off Belle Isle on 21 November 1797, the 24-gun privateer Coureur on 23 February 1798, and in company with HMS Russell captured the 12-gun privateer Bonne Citoyenne on 20 March 1798. Further successes that year included the 6-gun Arrogante off Brest 23 April 1798, and in company with HMS Pique, the 38-gun frigate Seine in the Breton Passage at the action of 30 June 1798. Marie came in the Royal Navy as HMS Halifax, Arrogante became HMS Arrogante, later renamed HMS Insolent. Seine too became a British ship, as HMS Seine, serving until being wrecked in 1803.

== Loss ==
HMS Jason struck an uncharted rock on 13 October 1798 while sailing off Brest and was wrecked. She was one of a handful of frigates to be lost on the dangerous Brest blockade with three of her class being lost, as well as HMS Ethalion the following year.

== Bibliography ==
- Clowes, William Laird (1997) [1900]. The Royal Navy, A History from the Earliest Times to 1900, Volume IV. Chatham Publishing. ISBN 1-86176-013-2.
- Colledge, J. J.; Warlow, Ben (2006) [1969]. Ships of the Royal Navy: The Complete Record of All Fighting Ships of the Royal Navy from the 15th Century to the Present (3rd Rev ed.). London: Chatham Publishing. ISBN 978-1-86176-281-8. OCLC 67375475.
- Gardiner, Robert (2006). Frigates of the Napoleonic Wars. London: Chatham Publishing. ISBN 1-86176-292-5.
- Winfield, Rif (2007). British Warships in the Age of Sail 1794–1817 : Design, Construction, Careers and Fates. Seaforth. ISBN 978-1-86176-246-7.
