= David Milne (Royal Navy officer) =

Royal Navy officer (1763–1845)

Admiral Sir David Milne GCB FRSE
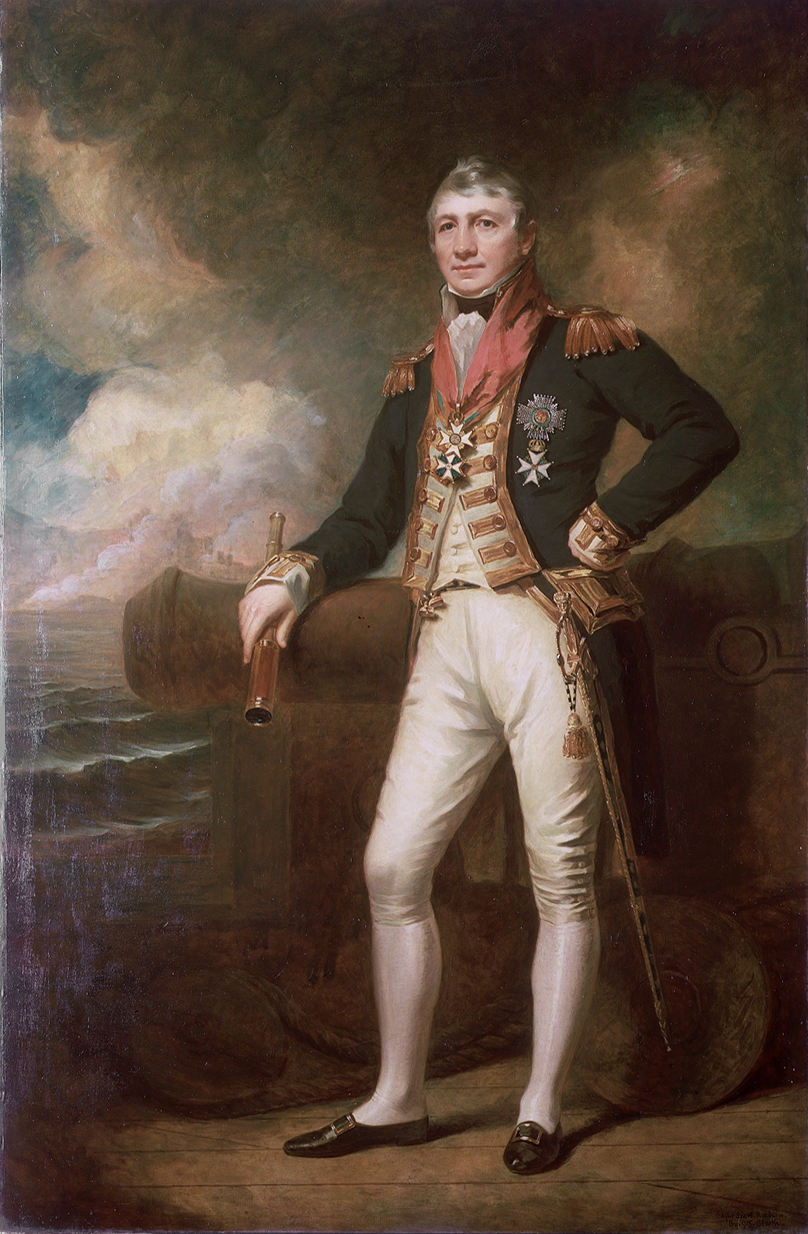
- Portrait by George Frederick Clarke, 1828
- Born: May 1763; Musselburgh, East Lothian
- Died: 5 May 1845 (aged 82); At sea returning to Scotland
- Military career
- Allegiance: Great Britain; United Kingdom
- Branch: Royal Navy
- Service years: 1779–1845
- Rank: Admiral
- Commands: HMS Quebec; HMS Alarm; HMS Inspector; HMS Matilda; HMS Pique; HMS Seine; Firth of Forth Sea Fencibles; HMS Impetueux; HMS Dublin; HMY Royal Charlotte; HMS Venerable; HMS Bulwark; North American Station; Plymouth Command
- Conflicts: American War of Independence; Second Relief of Gibraltar; Battle of Saint Kitts; Battle of the Saintes; French Revolutionary Wars; West Indies campaign; Action of 30 June 1798; Napoleonic Wars; War of 1812; Bombardment of Algiers
- Awards: Knight Grand Cross of the Order of the Bath

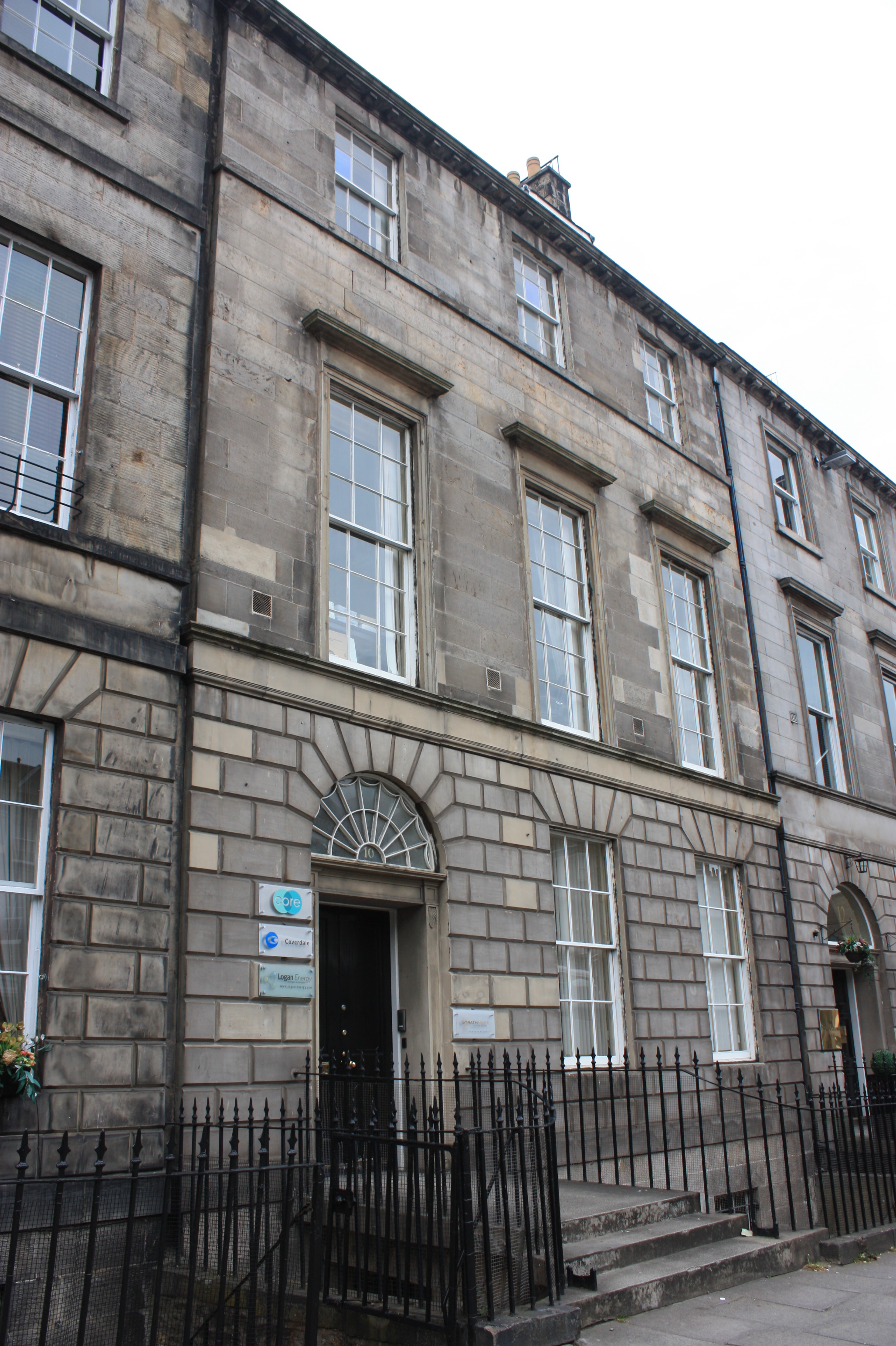
Sir David Milne's house at 10 York Place, Edinburgh

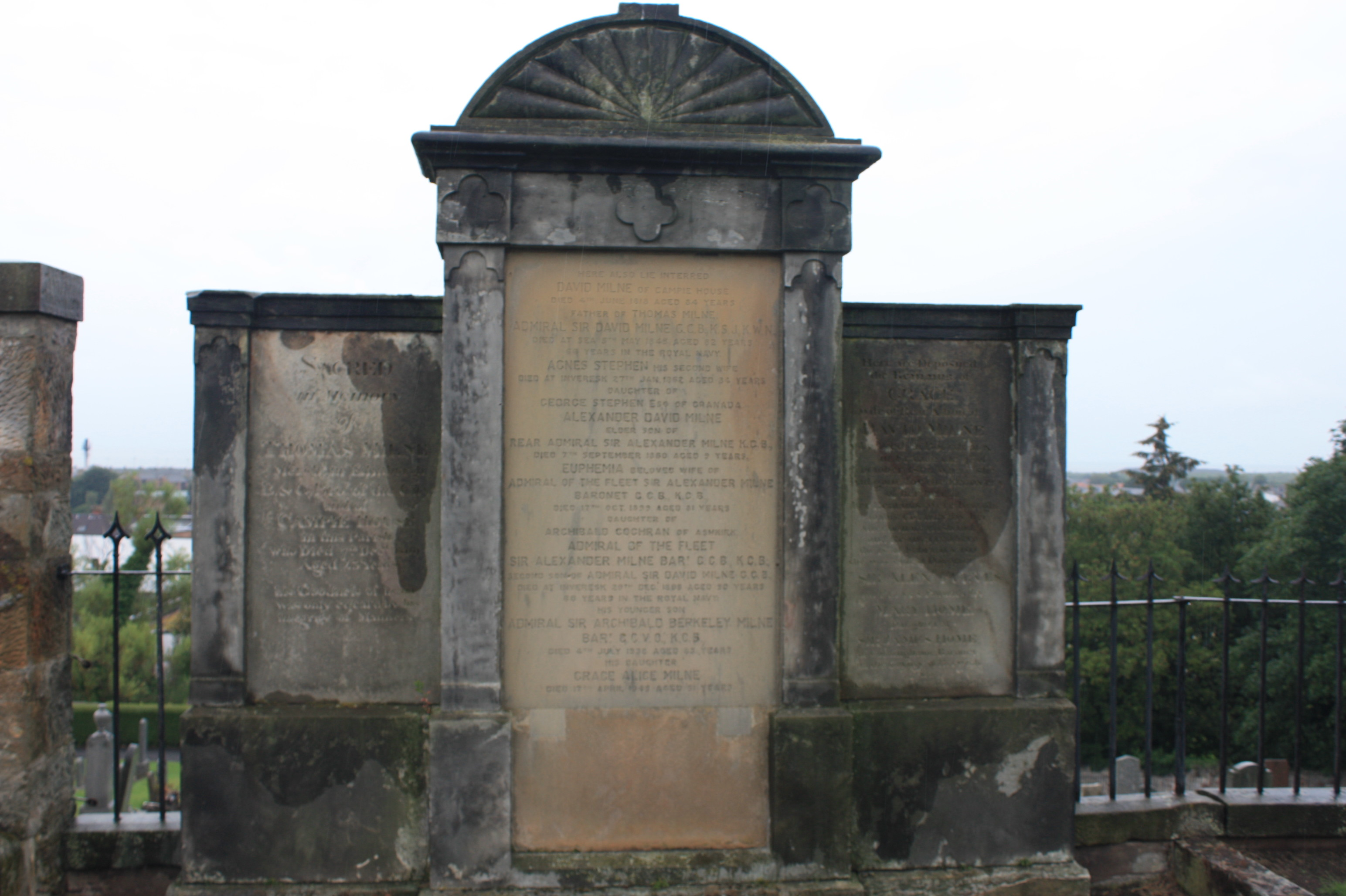
Admiral Milne's family grave, Inveresk

Admiral Sir David Milne GCB FRSE (May 1763 – 5 May 1845) was a Royal Navy officer.

== Life ==
Milne was born in Musselburgh, Midlothian, Scotland, the son of Susan Vernor and David Milne, an Edinburgh merchant.

He entered the Royal Navy as a midshipman in 1779. He served in the West Indies from 1779 to 1783, seeing action in the Caribbean during the American War of Independence and in Lord Howe's final relief of the French and Spanish siege of Gibraltar in 1782. From 1783 to 1793, he served in the East Indies. Promoted to commander, he defeated a French division off Puerto Rico on 5 June 1795, and, in 1796, he participated in the capture of the Dutch colonies of Demerara, Essequibo and Berbice, becoming the British governor of Netherlands Guiana. He continued to fight against the French in Santo Domingo, from 1797 to 1799, losing his ship HMS Pique but capturing the French frigate Seine at the action of 30 June 1798 and, in 1800, he captured the French frigate La Vengeance off the coast of Africa.

On 14 June 1814, he was promoted to Rear-Admiral. At this time he purchased 10 York Place, Edinburgh, home the late William Craig, Lord Craig.

He served as second-in-command of the fleet sent to bombard Algiers in 1816. The Dutch king awarded him the commander's cross of the coveted Military Order of William for his distinguished conduct. In May 1816, he was appointed to command the North American Station, living in Halifax, Nova Scotia. In 1818, he was nominated a knight of the Neapolitan Order of St Januarius, and he returned to the United Kingdom in 1819. In 1820, he was briefly Member of Parliament for Berwick-upon-Tweed. In 1825 he became a Vice-Admiral.

In 1842, he was appointed Commander-in-Chief, Plymouth. He died at sea 5 May 1845 while returning to Scotland from Plymouth, after more than 60 years' service in the Royal Navy. He is buried with his first wife in the churchyard at Inveresk. Memorial reads.

In memory of Admiral Sir DAVID MILNE, G.C.B., &c., &c., &c. For 60 years he served his country in the Royal Navy; his gallant deeds are recorded in her annals. In all the relations of private life he was upright, exemplary, and esteemed. He expired at sea on the 5th of May 1845, aged 82 years, whilst returning to his native home from Devonport, at which station he had been for the three previous years Commander-in-Chief. Here are deposited the remains of GRACE, wife of Rear-Admiral David Milne, who died at Bordeaux, in France, the 4th of October 1814, where she had gone for the recovery of her health. Her remains were brought to this country by her affectionate husband, and re-interred here the 18th of February 1815. She was eldest daughter of Sir Alexander Purves of Purves, Bart., by Mary Home, daughter of Sir James Home of Coldinghame, Bart., in the County of Berwick. Also a son, named THOMAS, who died in infancy.

== Family ==
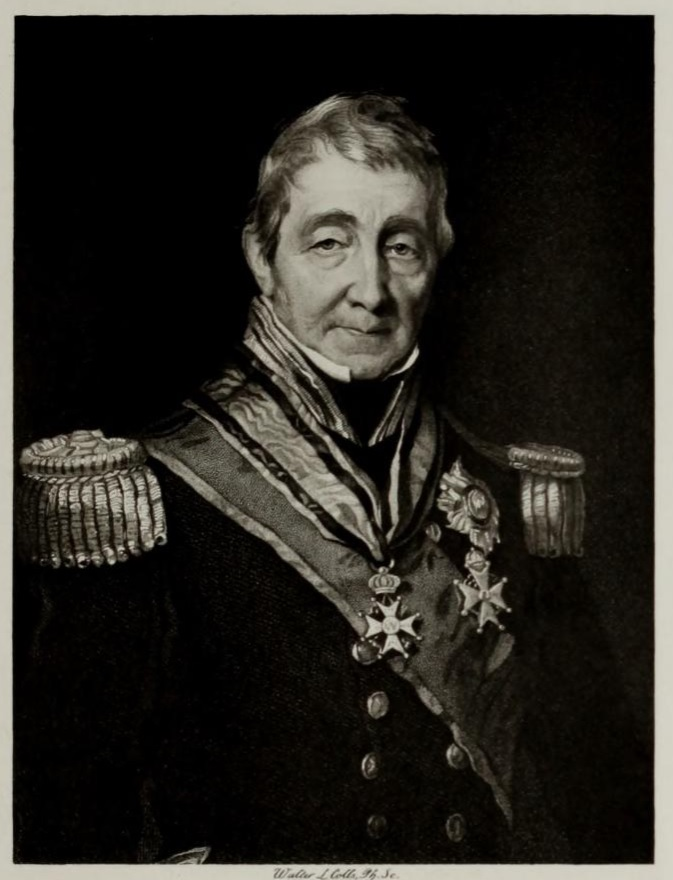
Admiral Sir David Milne

In 1799 he bought the house and grounds of Inveresk Gate in Inveresk, where his descendants continued to live until the 1940s. He also had a house at 10 York Place in Edinburgh's New Town in the 1830s.

n 16 April 1804, he was married to Grace Purves, eldest daughter of Sir Alexander Purves, 5th Baronet, of Purves, by his second wife Mary Home, daughter of Sir James Home, 3rd Baronet, of Coldingham. Their children included advocate and geologist David Milne-Home and Admiral of the Fleet Sir Alexander Milne, 1st Baronet. His wife died at Bordeaux, in France, on 4 October 1814, where she had gone for the recovery of her health. The admiral brought her body back to Scotland, and she was buried at Inveresk in East Lothian on 8 February 1815.

On 28 November 1819 he married for a second time, to Agnes Stephen.

== Milne Land ==
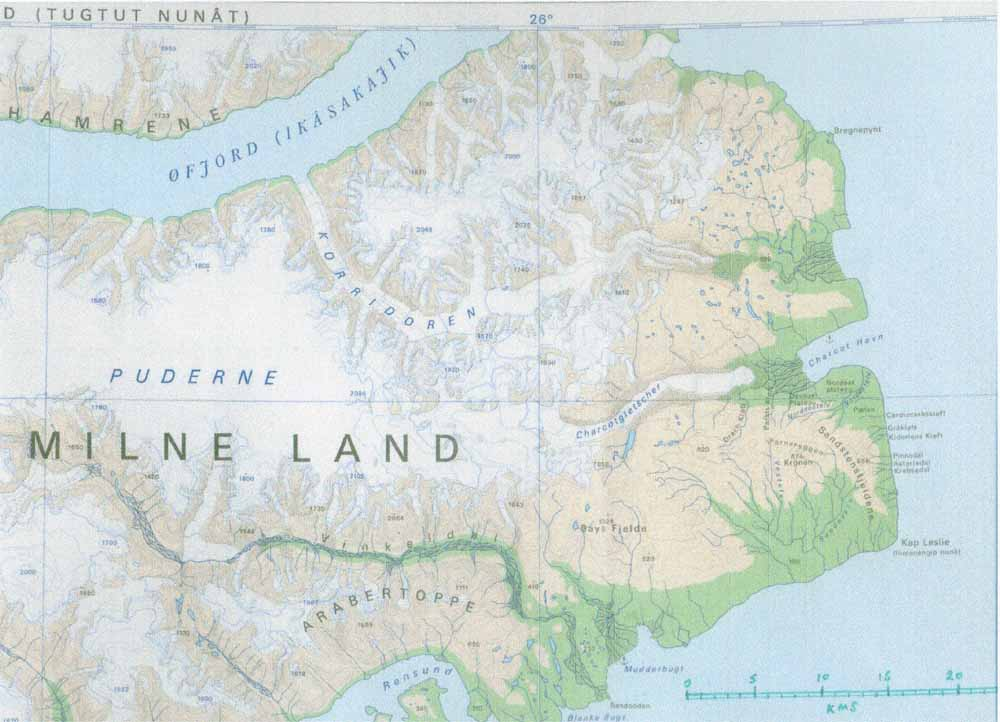
Map of Milne Land

Milne Land, in East Greenland, was named after him by Captain William Scoresby.

The island can be found 70.87 N, 25.42 W, sits in the large fjord Scoresby Sund and covers an area of 3,912.9 km^{2} (1,510.8 sq mi) with a highest point of 2,103 m (6,900 ft).

Parliament of the United Kingdom
Preceded by Alexander Allan; Henry St Paul	Member of Parliament for Berwick-upon-Tweed; 1820; With: Viscount Ossulston	Succeeded by Viscount Ossulston; Henry St Paul
Military offices
Preceded by Sir Alexander Cochrane	Commander-in-Chief, North American Station; 1816	Succeeded by Sir Edward Colpoys
Preceded by Sir Graham Moore	Commander-in-Chief, Plymouth; 1842–1845	Succeeded by Sir John West
