= French ship Brutus (1780) =

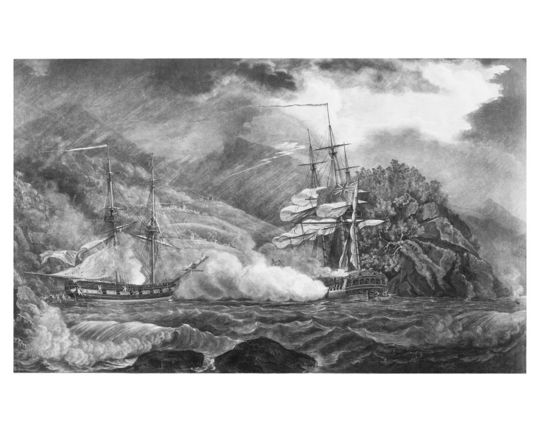
- Capture of Brutus by HMS Mermaid

History

France
- Name: Brutus
- Namesake: Brutus
- Builder: Bordeaux
- Launched: 1780
- Acquired: 1793
- Renamed: Célère (May 1795)
- Fate: Captured October 1795

General characteristics
- Displacement: 300 tons
- Propulsion: Sail
- Complement: 1793: 136; At capture:50
- Armament: 1793: 18 × 6-pounder guns; At capture:10 guns

Brutus was a merchant ship built in 1780 at Bordeaux. She was commissioned as a privateer in 1793 at Bordeaux. However, the French Navy purchased her in September 1793 at Brest and classed her as a corvette. The French Navy later converted her to a brig. HMS Mermaid captured her on 10 October 1795. (Note: This Brutus is not the Brutus Français, (ex-Pichegru, and frequently referred to in news reports as Brutus), which was a French 20-gun privateer operating highly successfully out of Charleston, South Carolina in 1795, in the Caribbean.)

== Career ==
The French Navy re-rigged Brutus as a brig at Brest either in 1793 or in May 1795. She carried out two diplomatic missions to the United States during 1794. In February 1794, she arrived at Norfolk, Virginia, with the news of the imminent arrival of a squadron under Van Stabel carrying Joseph Faucher to replace Citoyen Genêt as the French ambassador to the United States to replace Edmond-Charles Genêt. She also brought despatches to Van Stabel. The French had to replace Genêt, whom the French government considered crazy for having tried to instigate a revolution against President Washington. Brutus was under the command of enseigne de vaisseau (later lieutenant de vaisseau) Métaisyer.

Brutus was renamed Célère in May 1795 in France. but was still operating under the name Brutus when Mermaid captured her. She was refitted with a coppered hull and a brig rigging before her naval commission.

== Capture ==
On 10 October 1795 Mermaid was cruising to windward of Grenada when she discovered a ship and a brig anchored off La Baye. As the two vessels sighted Mermaid they got under weigh, but the brig soon bore up and ran into Requin Bay, where Mermaid followed her. The brig ran ashore and all aboard fled. These numbered 50 crew and 70 troops; she had landed another 50 troops when she had been anchored. On taking possession of the brig, the British discovered that she was a French naval vessel named Brutus. Four days later Mermaid captured the ship, which was the 18-gun French corvette Republicaine. Lloyd's List, in reporting the captures, described Brutus as having 18 guns, and Republican as having 10. After both vessels had been condemned at Grenada on 9 November 1795, HMS Zebra shared in the prize money by agreement with Mermaid.
