= HMS Seine (1798) =

Frigate of the Royal Navy

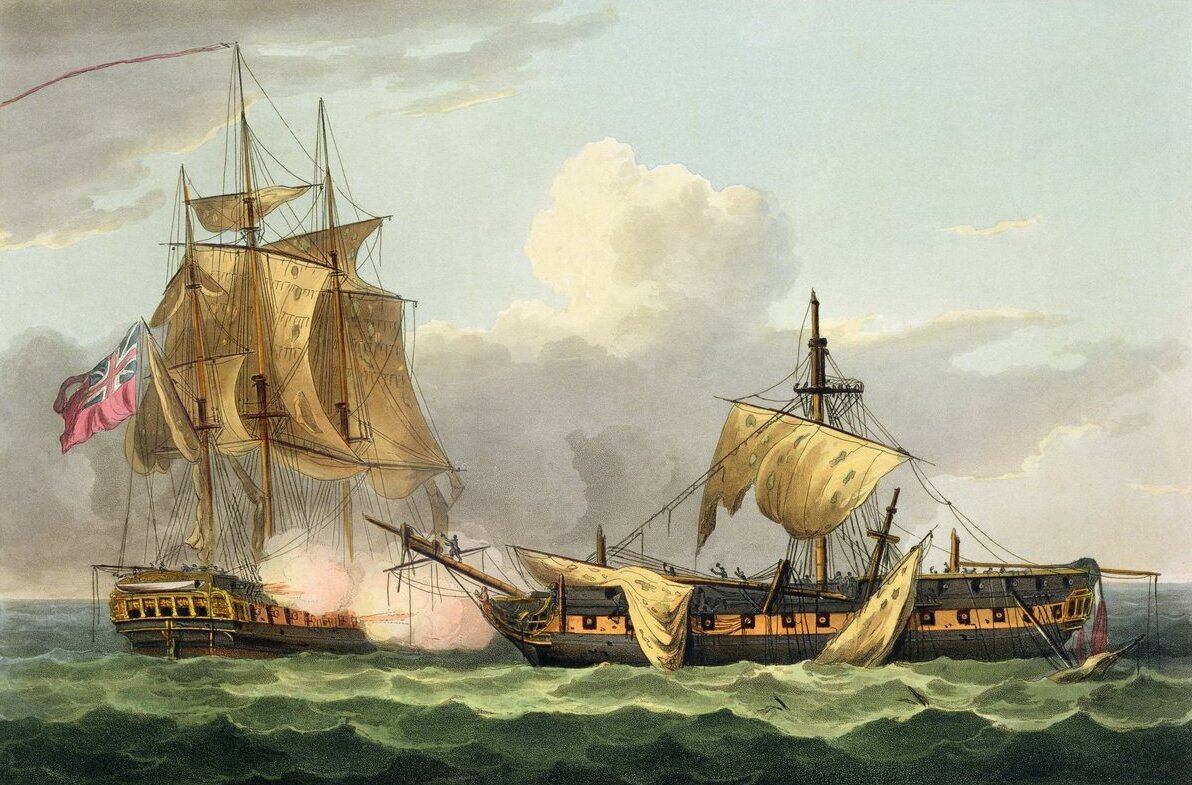
- Seine attacking the French frigate Vengeance

History

France
- Name: Seine
- Builder: Le Havre
- Laid down: May 1793
- Launched: 19 December 1793
- Completed: By March 1794
- Captured: 30 June 1798, by the Royal Navy

Great Britain
- Name: HMS Seine
- Acquired: 30 June 1798
- Honours and awards: Naval General Service Medal with clasp "Seine 20 Augt. 1800"
- Fate: Grounded on 21 July 1803; Burnt on 22 July to prevent capture

General characteristics
- Class & type: 38-gun Seine-class fifth rate
- Displacement: 1311 tonneaux
- Tons burthen: 700 port tonneaux; 1,14587/94 (bm)
- Length: 156 ft 9 in (47.8 m) (overall); 131 ft 9 in (40.2 m) (keel)
- Beam: 40 ft 6 in (12.3 m)
- Depth of hold: 12 ft 4 1/4 in (3.8 m)
- Sail plan: Full-rigged ship
- Complement: 284
- Armament: Upper deck: 28 × 18-pounder guns; QD: 8 × 9-pounder guns; Fc: 4 × 9-pounder guns

Seine was a 38-gun French Seine-class frigate that the Royal Navy captured in 1798 and commissioned as the fifth-rate HMS Seine. On 20 August 1800, Seine captured the French ship Vengeance in a single ship action that would win for her crew the Naval General Service Medal. Seine's career ended in 1803 when she hit a sandbank near the Texel.

== French career ==
Seine was a 40-gun frigate built between May 1793 and March 1794 at Le Havre, having been launched on 19 December 1793. Seine's career with the French Navy lasted less than five years.

On 14 July 1794 she and Galathée captured the 16-gun sloop-of-war HMS Hound in the Atlantic. In late 1794, L'Hermitte's squadron sailed for Norway. It comprised the frigates Seine, under L'Hermitte, Galathée, under Labutte, and Républicaine, under Le Bozec.

The squadron found itself blocked by cold and damage in a Norwegian harbour during the entire winter of 1794–95, sustaining over 250 dead from illness out of a total complement of 880. In spring, Seine and Galathée returned to France, leaving Républicaine to care for the untransportable sick. They eventually were rescued by the corvette Subtile.

Seine then sailed for Île de France.

On 15 May 1796 Forte, Vertu, Seine, and Régénérée were cruising between St Helena and the Cape of Good Hope hoping to capture British East Indiamen when they encountered the British whaler Lord Hawkesbury on her way to Walvis Bay. The French took off her crew, except for two seamen and a boy, and put Forte's fourth officer and 13-man prize crew aboard Lord Hawkesbury with orders to sail to Île de France. On her way there one of the British seamen, who was at the helm, succeeded in running her aground on the east coast of Africa a little north of the Cape, wrecking her. There were no casualties, but the prize crew became British prisoners.

Seine reached Île de France where she joined the squadron under Sercey. She took part in the action of 8 September 1796. In March 1798, she sailed from Île de France and was on her way to Lorient when she encountered a British frigate squadron in the Breton Passage on 30 June 1798.

HMS Jason and HMS Pique chased her down and captured her at the action of 30 June 1798. (Note: Mermaid was part of the British squadron involved but apparently did not take part in the action, though her arrival on the scene helped convince Seine to strike her colours.) Seine was commanded by Capitaine Bigot and was armed with forty-two 18 and 9-pounder guns. She had a crew of 610 men, including troops.

In the engagement Seine lost 170 men killed and some 100 men wounded, many mortally. Jason had seven men killed and 12 wounded. Pique lost one man killed, six wounded, and one man missing. In the fight Jason, Pique and Seine grounded; Pique was lost, but San Fiorenzo, which had arrived on the scene, was able to get Seine off. Although the casualties aboard Seine had been high she was not badly damaged and Captain David Milne, who had been captain of Pique, and his crew transferred to her. Her captors sailed her into Portsmouth, arriving there on 18 July; Milne commanded Seine for the rest of her career.

== British career ==
The Royal Navy took Seine into service under an Admiralty order dated 14 September 1798. She then spent several months fitting out at Portsmouth for the sum of £14,755. She was re-rated as a 38-gun frigate and Milne commissioned her in November.

On 13 February 1799 Seine captured Graff Bernstoff. Roughly a month later, on 18 March, Seine and Sea Gull recaptured Industry. That same day, in a probably related encounter, Seine was in sight when the hired armed brig Telegraph captured the French privateer Hirondelle in a notable action.

In 1800 Seine was at West Africa before she sailed for Jamaica in July. Around midnight 20/21 August 1800 Seine attacked the French ship, Vengeance, which had just finished repairing at Curaçao. The vessels broke off action and Seine was unable to resume the engagement until morning 21 August. Then, after an hour and a half of hard fighting, Seine captured the French frigate. Both ships had sustained heavy casualties; 13 crew were killed aboard the Seine, 29 were wounded, and the ship was cut up. However, Vengeance sustained worse; almost cut to pieces, many considered her beyond repair. Nevertheless Vengeance was repaired in Jamaica and taken into British service under her existing name. In 1847 the Admiralty authorized the issue of the Naval General Service Medal with clasp "Seine 20 Augt. 1800" to all surviving claimants from this action.

The naval historian William James subsequently exaggerated Vengeance's earlier engagement with Constellation in favour of the French. He declared that as Seine had done what Constellation could not, British naval forces were "more potent than American thunder". That said, Vengeance had been heavily armed with twenty-eight 18-pounder guns (main deck), sixteen 12-pounder guns and eight 42-pounder carronades (QD and Fc), brass swivel guns on the gunwales, with shifting guns on the main and quarter decks.

On 22 December she reportedly impressed an American sailor off American ship "Two Brothers", after beating her Captain and tying him to the bowsprit.

By March 1801 Seine was at Jamaica, as part of the fleet under Lord Hugh Seymour. She was then paid off in 1802.

== Fate ==
Seine underwent a refit at Chatham Dockyard between June and July 1803, with Milne recommissioning her in May for the North Sea. However, shortly after her return to service she grounded on a sandbank to the northward of Terschelling on 21 July 1803. That evening Milne had ordered the pilots to keep her out of shallow water and they had assured him that she was safe; forty minutes later she struck. The crew labored all night and well into the morning, with the assistance of two passing merchant vessels to pull her off and to lighten her, but to no avail. At about 11:30am the crew abandoned Seine; they set fire to her as they left to prevent the French recapturing her.

A court martial on 4 August 1803 honourably acquitted Captain Milne, his officers and crew for the loss of the vessel. However, it found the pilots guilty of ignorance. The court martial sentenced them to be mulcted of all their wages for two years and to be imprisoned in the Marshalsea for two years.
