= James Newman-Newman =

Captain James Newman-Newman
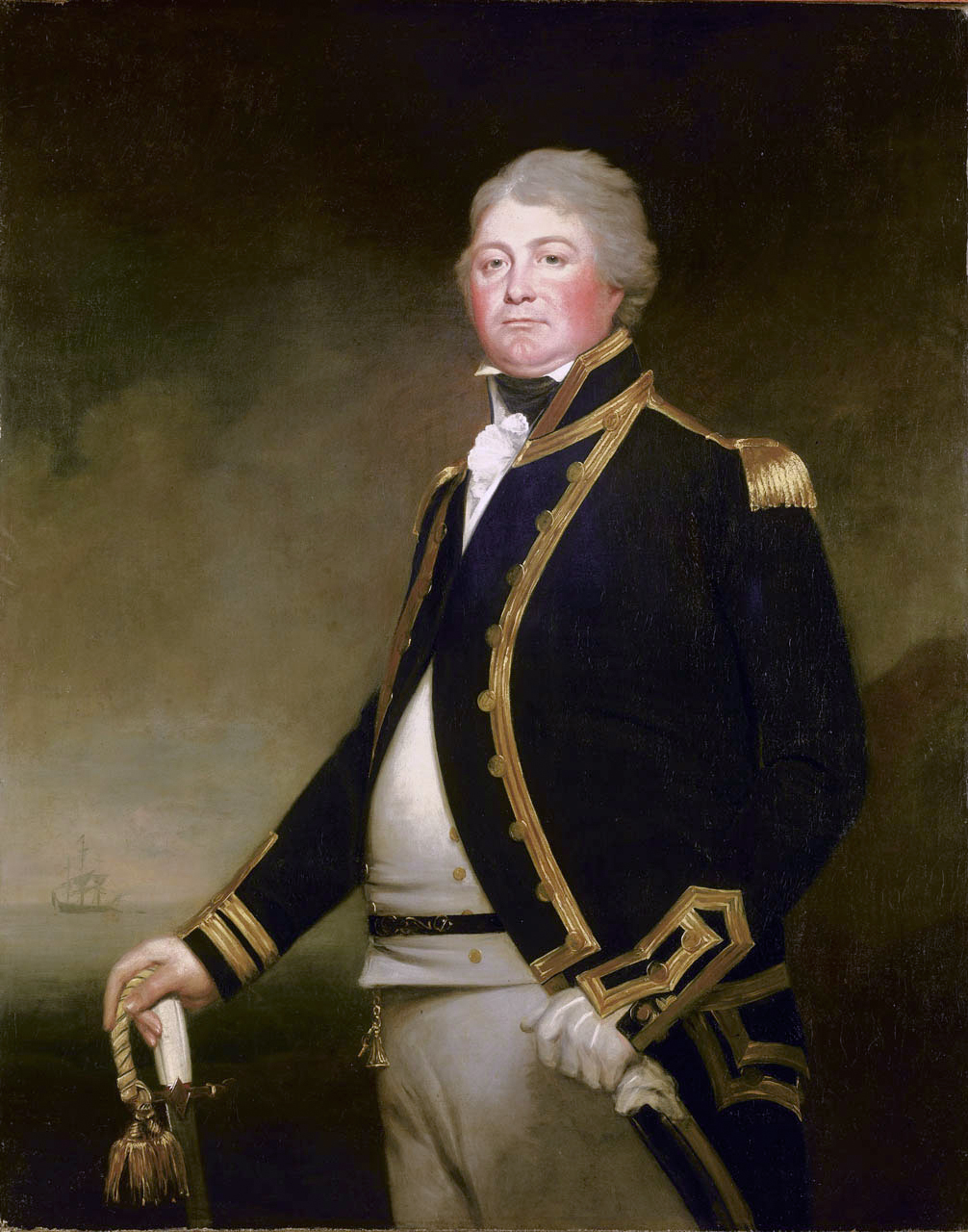
- James Newman-Newman, Archer James Oliver c. 1801
- Born: 1767
- Died: 25 December 1811 (aged 43–44); HMS Hero, on Haak Sand, Texel
- Military career
- Allegiance: United Kingdom
- Branch: Royal Navy
- Rank: Captain
- Conflicts: French Revolutionary Wars; Glorious First of June; Capture of Loire; Capture of Pallas; Napoleonic Wars; Wreck of HMS Hero

Captain James Newman-Newman (1767 – 25 December 1811) was a Royal Navy officer who served in numerous actions with distinction during the French Revolutionary and Napoleonic Wars before his death in the wreck of his ship of the line HMS Hero, which was lost with two other battleships off the Northern European coast during a storm in December 1811. Over 2,000 sailors lost their lives.

== Career ==
Newman-Newman was born in 1767, and joined the Royal Navy at a young age, serving as a lieutenant aboard the flagship of Sir Alexander Hood, HMS Royal George during the battle of the Glorious First of June, when a French fleet was defeated deep in the Atlantic by the British Channel Fleet under Lord Howe. Due to good service in this action, Newman-Newman was promoted to captain and took command of a succession of frigates in the Mediterranean and home waters, beginning with HMS Ceres in 1795.

On 21 March 1796, the sloop HMS Lark, under William Ogilvy, joined the Ceres and Newman-Newman in providing support to an unsuccessful attack by British troops from Port-au-Prince on the town and fort of Léogane on the island of Hispaniola.

In 1798, Newman-Newman was in command of the frigate HMS Mermaid during the campaign against a French fleet which threatened to invade Ireland. The French force was destroyed at the Battle of Tory Island, in which Mermaid was not engaged, but the surviving French ships scattered into the Atlantic and Mermaid was one of the ships tasked with tracking them. On 15 October, Mermaid, in company with the brig HMS Kangaroo discovered the French frigate Loire and gave chase, catching and engaging the French ship. Loire was too strong for her opponents, however, and despite suffering heavy damage, managed to escape. The following day Loire was captured by the large razee HMS Anson, having suffered heavy casualties. Mermaid had taken 17 casualties herself and Newman-Newman was praised for his conduct.

Two years later, Newman-Newman was again involved in the capture of a French frigate, this time as captain of HMS Loire, the same ship he had captured two years previously. The French Pallas had been sighted off St Malo by two small Royal Navy ships and, despite the disparity in size, the small craft engaged the much larger frigate. Pallas was able to hold off her diminutive opponents, but in the afternoon of 5 February 1800 a squadron led by Newman-Newman in Loire arrived. In the engagement which followed, the five British ships fought a lengthy battle with Pallas and French shore batteries under which the frigate was sheltering until eventually Pallas surrendered. Loire had suffered 22 casualties.

In 1802, Newman-Newman was briefly in reserve during the Peace of Amiens, but he soon returned to service as commander of a ship of the line following the resumption of the Napoleonic Wars the following year. In the summer of 1809, he was called as a witness at the Court-martial of James, Lord Gambier which assessed whether Admiral Lord Gambier had failed to support Captain Lord Cochrane at the Battle of Basque Roads in April 1809. Gambier was controversially cleared of all charges. Newman-Newman's service was in Home Waters and the Baltic Sea. In 1811 he was tasked with escorting a large convoy from Gothenburg to London in his ship HMS Hero. Returning in late 1811, the convoy, which had joined with parts of the British Baltic Fleet, was struck by a huge storm which wrecked over 30 merchant ships and on 24 December claimed the flagship HMS St George and HMS Defence. Hundreds of sailors were drowned including Admiral Robert Carthew Reynolds. The next day, Christmas Day 1811, HMS Hero was also driven ashore, onto the Haak Sands off the Texel. Weather conditions were so severe that no boats could be launched and no rescue attempted and as a result only 12 men from a crew of several hundred reached safety. Newman-Newman was not among them.
