= Charles Stirling =

Royal Navy officer (1760-1833)

Vice-Admiral Charles Stirling
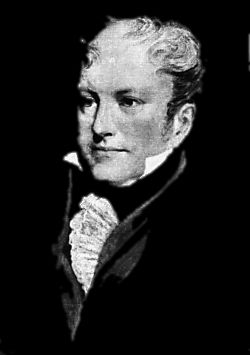
- Portrait of Stirling
- Born: 28 April 1760; London, England
- Died: 7 November 1833 (aged 73); Woburn Farm, Chertsey, Surrey
- Military career
- Allegiance: Great Britain; United Kingdom
- Branch: Royal Navy
- Service years: –1833
- Rank: Vice-admiral
- Commands: HMS Savage HMS Pompee; Commissioner Jamaica Dockyard; HMS Glory; HMS Sampson; HMS Diadem; Cape of Good Hope Station Jamaica Station
- Conflicts: French Revolutionary Wars; Algeciras campaign; Napoleonic Wars; Battle of Cape Finisterre (1805); Battle of Montevideo (1807); War of 1812
- Awards: Freedom of the City of London

Vice-Admiral Charles Stirling (28 April 1760 – 7 November 1833) was a Royal Navy officer.

== Early life and career ==
Charles Stirling was born in London on 28 April 1760 and baptised at St. Albans on 15 May. The son of Captain Sir Walter Stirling, he was born into a family with a long and proud naval tradition. Stirling joined the Royal Navy and was promoted to captain in 1783. On 11 August 1789 he married Charlotte Grote at Greenwich, London. He was involved in the capture of Seine at the action of 30 June 1798 during which he was wounded, and took part in the July 1801 Battle of Algeciras as captain of the 74-gun HMS Pompee. Later that year he was appointed Commissioner at Jamaica Yard.

== Admiral ==
Stirling was recalled to England in late 1804, and on arrival was promoted to rear admiral and hoisted his flag in the 98-gun HMS Glory, which had been one of the famous ships involved in the Glorious First of June battle, and was now the flagship of the Rochefort squadron. Stirling immediately arranged for his nephew James to transfer to his ship as a midshipman. James Stirling would remain under his uncle's command until 1808, and would be enormously influenced by his uncle, both professionally and personally.

On 22 July 1805, Stirling took part in the Battle of Cape Finisterre under Sir Robert Calder, during which his squadron attacked the combined French and Spanish fleets off Cape Finisterre. In July 1806 he was given command of the ship HMS Sampson and order to convoy General Samuel Auchmuty's troops to Buenos Aires, where he would relieve Admiral Sir Home Riggs Popham, who, with troops under William Carr Beresford, had captured Buenos Aires in the first of a series of British invasions of the River Plate. By the time he arrived, Buenos Aires had been retaken by the Spanish, so after relieving Popham and transferring to Popham's ship, HMS Diadem, Stirling aided Auchmuty in a successful attack on Montevideo. He was later praised in both Houses of Parliament and in the British press for his good judgement.

Shortly after the capture of Montevideo, Stirling was relieved and ordered to take up the office of naval Commander-in-Chief at the Cape of Good Hope Station. He was recalled to London after about five months. On 31 July 1810, he was promoted to vice admiral, and given the Freedom of the City of London. He also received a sword with "gallant and meritorious conduct at the capture of the Fortress of Monte Video" inscribed on the hilt. Stirling took an extended period of leave, but in October 1811 returned to active service to take up an appointment as Commander-in-Chief of the Jamaica Station. When war broke out with America, he was placed under the command of Admiral Sir John Borlase Warren in September 1812, and led his squadron in harassing American shipping and conducting coastal raids in the Bermuda area.

== Court martial ==
In June 1813 Stirling was relieved and ordered to return to London. On arriving in London late in 1813, he learned that he had been recalled to face charges of accepting payment for protecting foreign seamen. The specific charges were contained in a letter written by Commissioner Wolley at Jamaica, who claimed "that His Majesty's Naval Service had been brought into disrepute in consequence of it being spoken of publicly that ships of war were hired out to convoy vessels going to the Spanish Main." Wolley cited a specific incident, when Stirling was said to have received $2000 for the hire of His Majesty's sloop Sappho. Aspects of the charge were dismissed, but the verdict that was handed down in May 1814 was "that the charge had been in part proved." Although it was agreed that Stirling's actions were excusable on humanitarian grounds, he had acted against regulations. He was retired on half pay, and barred from further promotion.

Stirling appealed in July and won a number of concessions: a restoration to flag officer status and the right to continue to be addressed as "senior vice admiral of the white". The Admiralty, however, refused to return him to active service.

== Later life ==
Stirling's wife died on 25 March 1825 at Woburn Farm, Chertsey, Surrey. Stirling was reported as seriously ill in September 1833, and he died at Woburn Farm on 7 November 1833. His only daughter Charlotte Dorothea Stirling married her cousin Charles Stirling of Muiravonside House on 1 May 1827.

== Cultural references ==
Charles Stirling appears as a character in the book Master and Commander by Patrick O'Brian.

== Sources ==
- Cundall, Frank (1915). Historic Jamaica. West India Committee.
- Statham Drew, Pamela (2003). James Stirling: Admiral and Founding Governor of Western Australia. Crawley: UWA Publishing. ISBN 978-1-876268-94-7. LCCN 2003464253. OL 3760974M. Wikidata Q136431983.

Military offices
Preceded by Home Riggs Popham	Commander-in-Chief, Cape of Good Hope Station; 1807–1808	Succeeded by Josias Rowley
Preceded by James Giles Vashon	Commander-in-Chief, Jamaica Station; 1811–1812	Succeeded by William Brown
