= Indien (1777 ship) =

Frigate for the U.S. Commissioners in France

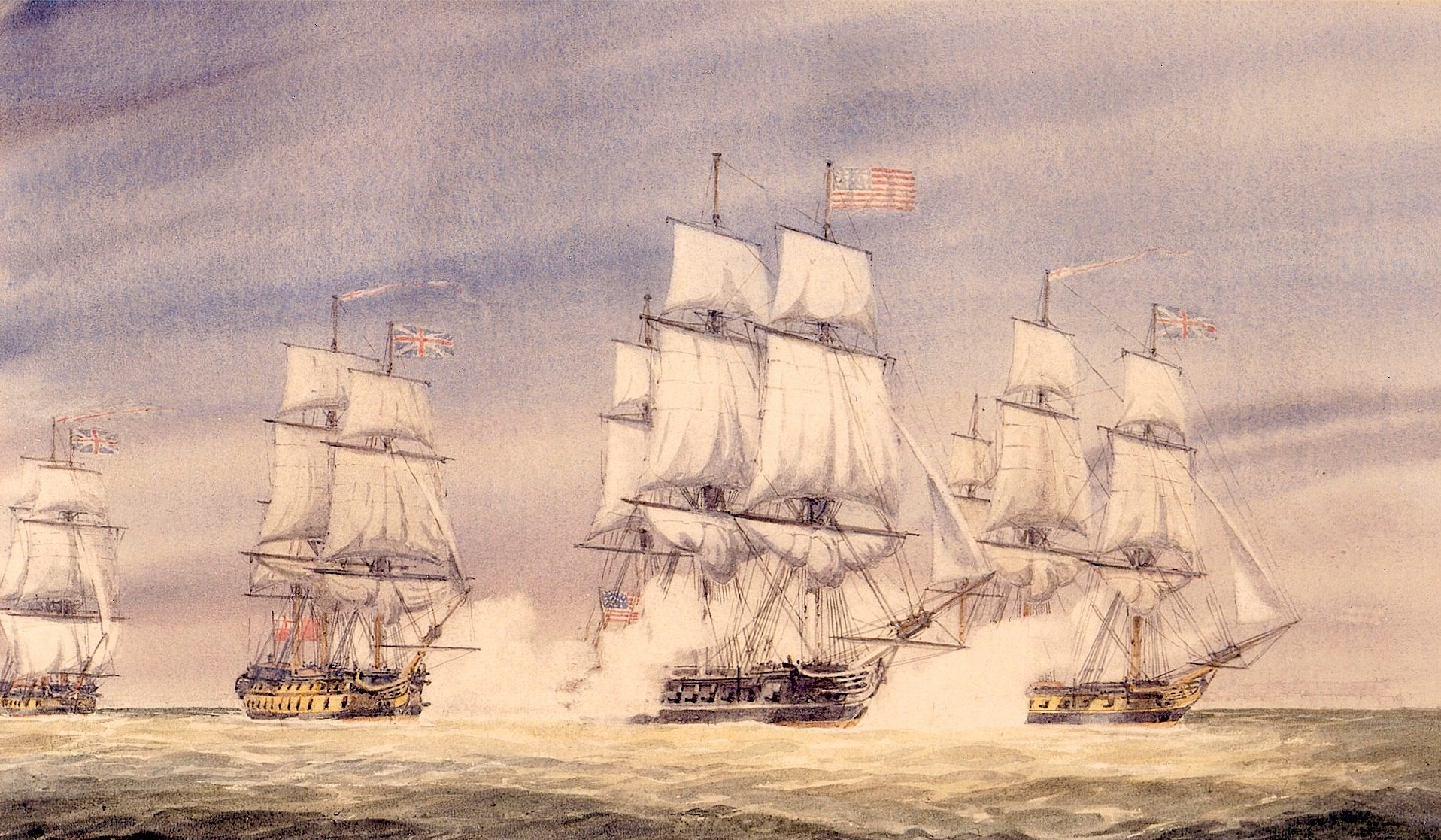
- South Carolina (second from right) at the Battle of the Delaware Capes

History

South Carolina
- Name: Indien (1777–1780); South Carolina (1780–1782)
- Laid down: Early 1777
- Launched: November 1777
- Fate: Transferred to the South Carolina Navy, 1780.; Captured by Royal Navy, 1782.

General characteristics
- Type: Frigate
- Tons burthen: 1,430 (bm)
- Length: 170 ft (52 m)
- Beam: 43 ft 3 in (13.18 m)
- Draft: 16 ft 6 in (5.03 m)
- Propulsion: Sail
- Complement: 550 officers and men
- Armament: 28 × 36-pounder guns + 12 × 12-pounder guns

Indien was a 40-gun frigate ordered by American diplomats in France Benjamin Franklin, Silas Deane, and Arthur Lee. Designed by shipwright Jacques Boux, she was laid down in early 1777 at a private shipyard in Amsterdam and launched in November 1777. Built with the scantlings and lines of a small 74-gun ship of the line, she was constructed as a frigate. In 1780, the Duke of Luxembourg chartered her to the South Carolina State Navy, which renamed her South Carolina.

Her armament consisted of 28 Swedish 36-pounder long guns on her main deck, and 12 12-pounder long guns on her forecastle and quarterdeck. (Note: British records from the survey in New York after her capture have her carrying 28 Swedish 39-pounders, 10 12-pounders on her quarterdeck, and two 9-pounders on her forecastle. She may also have carried some eight smaller guns, but the survey does not report them.) In December 1782, she was captured by the Royal Navy in the Battle of the Delaware Capes. The British did not take her into service, and she disappears from historical records after 1783. Perhaps her greatest significance is that the marine architect Joshua Humphreys studied her sleek hull and used her lines in designing the United States Navy's first frigates, especially USS Constitution and USS Constellation.

== Construction history ==
In 1777, Continental Navy officer John Paul Jones sailed for the Kingdom of France, hoping to assume command of Indien; however, prior to his arrival, financial difficulties and opposition from the still-neutral Dutch Republic had forced the commissioners to sell the frigate to King Louis XVI under British diplomatic pressure.

For over three years the ship remained idle while several American and European agents schemed to obtain her. Finally, on 30 May 1780 the King granted her to the Duke of Luxembourg, who simultaneously chartered her to South Carolina, represented by Commodore Alexander Gillon of the South Carolina State Navy, for a quarter-share of her prizes. (Note: The charter contract specified that the officers and crew would get a half share, the State of South Carolina a quarter share, and the Duke a quarter share.) Gillon renamed the frigate South Carolina.

== Service as South Carolina and capture ==
In 1781 South Carolina, manned by American officers and a group of European seamen and marines, sailed from Texel via Scotland and Ireland. On the way she captured a privateer. She then stopped at Corunna and Santa Cruz before sailing across the Atlantic toward Charleston. On the way to Tenerife she captured the brig Venus, loaded with a cargo of salt fish from Newfoundland for Lisbon. When she found that the British had already occupied Charleston she sailed for the West Indies. On the way she captured five Jamaican vessels in the Gulf of Mexico. She then took her prizes to Havana, Cuba.

South Carolina arrived at Havana on 12 January 1782. At Havana, after negotiations between Gillon and the Spanish, the South Carolina joined a force of 59 vessels sent to capture the British colony of New Providence in the Bahamas. On 22 April the expedition sailed and by 5 May the whole fleet had reached New Providence. On 8 May the colony surrendered. This was the third capture of New Providence during the American Revolutionary War.

South Carolina then sailed north, arriving at Philadelphia on 28 May. On the way, on 25 May a British privateer, the Virginia of New York, trailed her, firing the occasional cannon to try to draw the attention of any vessels of the Royal Navy that might be cruising in the area. South Carolina sustained no damage.

She remained in Philadelphia nearly six months. While she was there the Duke of Luxembourg dismissed Gillon and replaced him as captain with Captain John Joyner. She sailed in November but not very far. Most of her crew had never been out to sea and began to have regrets. Fortunately she had some 50 Hessian marines and eight British soldiers aboard who had been captured from General John Burgoyne's army at the Battle of Saratoga and who had been recruited from prison. Ironically, they remained loyal, thus forestalling the brewing mutiny.

On 20 December, while she was attempting to dash out of Philadelphia, Pennsylvania, through the British blockade she ran into a squadron of three British frigates. South Carolina was in the company of the brig Constance, schooner Seagrove and the ship Hope, which had joined her for protection. The three British vessels were the 44-gun fifth rate two-decker HMS Diomede, Captain Thomas L. Frederick and the two 32-gun Fifth Rate frigates HMS Quebec, Captain Christopher Mason, and HMS Astraea, Captain Matthew Squires.

The British chased South Carolina for 18 hours and fired on her for two hours before she struck her colours in the Delaware River. She had a crew of about 466 men when captured, of whom she lost six men killed and eight wounded. The British suffered no casualties.

Astraea and Quebec captured Hope and Constance, which was carrying tobacco. Prize crews then took South Carolina, Hope and Constance to New York. Seagrove escaped.

The British did not take South Carolina into service because she was too lightly framed for the Royal Navy. The problem was that South Carolina's hull had hogged as a consequence of the weight of her guns. (American warship designers subsequently put much more longitudinal strength into the design of their frigates.)

== Fate ==
The British put South Carolina up for sale to private parties for use as a merchantman. Her last recorded trip was to Deal, Kent in 1783 as part of the British evacuation of New York. She carried some 600 German soldiers, some of whom may well earlier have served on her as marines. There is no information about what happened to South Carolina thereafter though the discovery during World War II of a ship's bell with the name South Carolina on it in a jute mill between Calcutta and the coast on the Ganges River in India suggests that she may have reached the Indian Ocean.
