= Alexander Gillon =

American sea captain, merchant, politician, and military officer

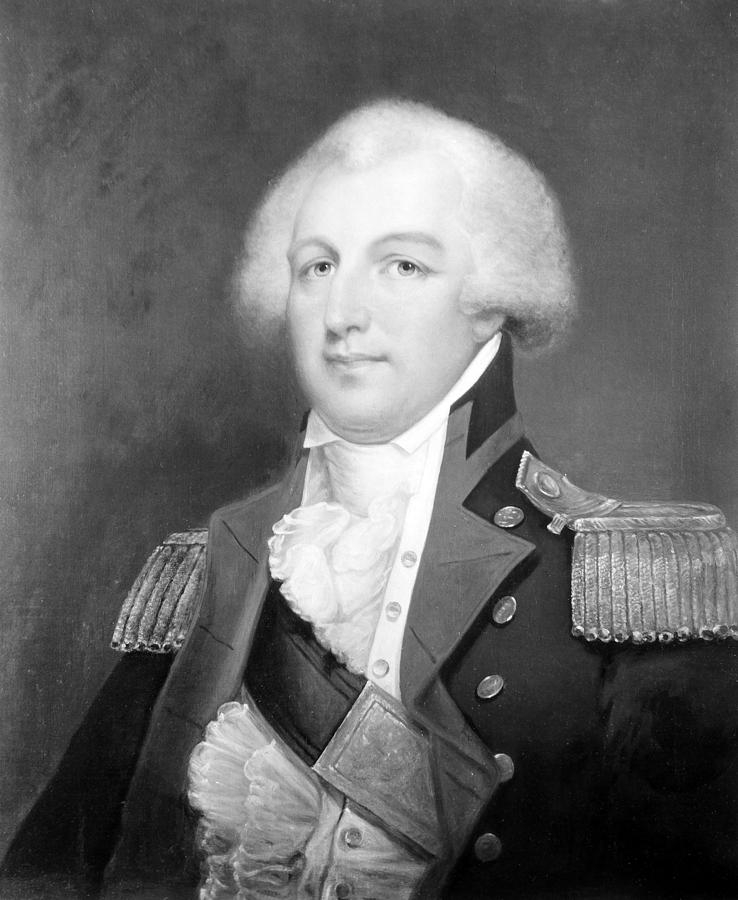

Member of the U.S. House of Representatives from South Carolina's 5th district
- In office March 4, 1793 – October 6, 1794
- Preceded by: Thomas Tudor Tucker
- Succeeded by: Robert Goodloe Harper

13th Lieutenant Governor of South Carolina
- In office January 26, 1789 – February 15, 1791
- Governor: Charles Pinckney
- Preceded by: Thomas Gadsden
- Succeeded by: Isaac Holmes

Member of the South Carolina House of Representatives from St. Philip and St. Michael's Parish
- In office March 26, 1776 – October 20, 1776

Member of the South Carolina Provincial Congress from St. Philip and St. Michael's Parish
- In office November 8, 1775 – March 26, 1776
- Preceded by: George Gabriel Powell
- Succeeded by: Position abolished

Personal details
- Born: August 13, 1741 Rotterdam, Dutch Republic
- Died: October 6, 1794 (aged 53) Orangeburg District, South Carolina, U.S.
- Resting place: Calhoun County, South Carolina
- Party: Anti-Administration
- Profession: sailor, planter

Military service
- Allegiance: United States of America
- Branch/service: South Carolina Navy
- Years of service: 1778–1782
- Rank: Commodore
- Battles/wars: American Revolutionary War

Alexander Gillon (August 13, 1741 – October 6, 1794) was an American sea captain, merchant, politician, and military officer. He represented South Carolina in the United States House of Representatives in 1793 and 1794.

== Early life ==
Alexander Gillon was born on August 13, 1741, in Rotterdam, Dutch Republic to Scottish parents. He was educated in London and lived there for a period of time before becoming a sea captain, sailing the brigantine Surprize to Charleston, South Carolina in 1765. While in Charleston, Gillon married Mary Cripps, a widow from Kent living in the city, and sailed back to England in the brigantine Free-Mason in 1766; he returned to South Carolina in the same year.

== Mercantile and military career ==
In 1766, he settled down in Charleston and established a large business. Some ten years later he became involved in politics. He was a delegate to the Second Provincial Congress of South Carolina in 1775 and 1776 and was a member of the first general assembly in 1776. His men elected him captain of the German Fusiliers of Charleston in May 1775. Three years later South Carolina appointed him commodore of the South Carolina State Navy and sent him to France to procure vessels for the navy.

In 1780 he chartered Indien from the Duke of Luxembourg on behalf of the South Carolina State Navy, for a quarter-share of her prizes. Gillon renamed the frigate South Carolina. In 1781, South Carolina, manned by American officers and a group of European seamen and marines, sailed across the Atlantic toward Charleston. When she found that the British had already captured the city she sailed to Cuba. Between August and October 1781 she captured a cutter, a privateer, the brig Venus and seven other vessels.

South Carolina arrived at Havana on January 12, 1782. At Havana, after negotiations between Gillon and the Spanish, South Carolina joined a force of 59 vessels sent to capture the Bahamas. On April 22 the expedition sailed and by May 5 the whole fleet had reached New Providence. On May 8 the colony surrendered. This was the third capture of New Providence during the American Revolutionary War.

South Carolina then sailed north, arriving at Philadelphia on May 28 . Here she remained nearly six months. While she was there the Duke of Luxembourg dismissed Gillon and replaced him as captain with Captain John Joyner. Shortly thereafter the British warships HMS Diomede, HMS Quebec, and HMS Astraea captured South Carolina in the Battle of the Delaware Capes.

== Political career ==
He was the founder and first president of the Charleston Chamber of Commerce. In 1784 he was elected to the Continental Congress but did not attend. Four years later he was a delegate to the State convention that ratified the Federal Constitution in 1788. Next, he was elected as an Anti-Administration candidate to the Third Congress, after previously being a candidate in 1788 to the First Congress. On February 10, 1789, he married Ann Purcell, the daughter of Reverend Henry Purcell, rector of St Michael's Church in Charleston. He was also an owner of 106 slaves. He served from March 4, 1793, until his death on October 6, 1794, at his plantation. He was buried in the family burial ground at the plantation “Gillon’s Retreat,” Orangeburg District, Calhoun County, South Carolina.

== See also ==
- List of members of the United States Congress who died in office (1790–1899)

Political offices
| Preceded by Thomas Gadsden | Lieutenant Governor of South Carolina; 1789–1791 | Succeeded by Isaac Holmes |
U.S. House of Representatives
| Preceded by Thomas Tudor Tucker | Member of the U.S. House of Representatives from South Carolina's 5th congressional district 1793–1794 | Succeeded by Robert Goodloe Harper |
