= Frederick Finch =

Frederick or Fred Finch may refer to:

- Frederick Finch (cricketer) (1830–1892), English cricketer
- Frederick Finch (photographer) (1835–1920), New Zealand carpenter and photographer
- Fred Finch (footballer) (1895–1952), Australian rules footballer
- Fred Finch (politician) (1945–2018), Australian politician
- Frederick J. Finch (born 1956), American Chief Master Sergeant of the Air Force

== See also ==
- Fred Finch House, a historic building in Davenport, Iowa, United States
