= Prince of Wales (ship) =

Numerous British vessels have borne the name Prince of Wales, after the then current Prince of Wales, the title borne by the heir-presumptive to the throne of the United Kingdom.

- Prince of Wales was a transport carrying troops to Savannah, Georgia that the South Carolina Navy's vessels Hornet and Eagle captured on 1 April 1779.
- Prince of Wales was a vessel belonging to the Excise service of Scotland. She had been launched in 1794 by John and William Scott, Greenock. In 1799 she was responsible for the coast between the Mull of Cantire and Cape Wrath. In 1803 or 1806 the British Admiralty purchased her and she became Thrush. She foundered in 1815, but was salvaged and sold.
- Prince of Wales (1786 ship), launched in 1779 but rebuilt in 1786, made one trip transporting convicts and supplies to Botany Bay, and then carried a cargo for the EIC from Canton to Britain in 1787-89; she became a whaler, a privateer, a slave ship, was captured by a French privateer, was recaptured, and was last listed in 1810.
- Prince of Wales (1789 ship) built at Hull, transported supplies to Botany Bay for the British government and then carried a cargo from Canton back to England for the British East India Company. She is last listed in 1811.
- Prince of Wales (1793 ship) was launched on the Thames. She spent much of her career sailing for the Hudson's Bay Company. From 1844 she was a Greenland whaler, sailing out of Hull. In 1845 she was the last ship to see Sir John Franklin's expedition to the arctic. She was wrecked on 12 June 1849 in Davis Strait.
- Prince of Wales (1815 ship) was a French prize that first appeared in British records in 1815. She became a West Indiaman and then made three voyages as a whaler in the southern whale fishery. She returned to mercantile service and was last listed in 1833.
- HM Packet Ship Prince of Wales. See Sinking of Rochdale and Prince of Wales in 1807.
- Prince of Wales (1842 ship), launched in 1842, a Blackwall frigate
- Prince of Wales (New Zealand Company) sailed from London on 2 September 1842 and arrived in New Zealand on 31 December of that year. See New Zealand Company ships.
- Prince of Wales (1845 ship) was a Hudson's Bay Company schooner which operated in the Pacific Northwest. See Hudson's Bay Company vessels.
- Prince of Wales (1850 ship) was launched at Southampton. She served the Hudson's Bay Company until 1864. She grounded in 1864 at Mansel Island, was refloated, and then was condemned at York Factory. See Hudson's Bay Company vessels.
- PS Prince of Wales (1886), a paddle steamer in service 1886–96
- SS Prince of Wales, a paddle steamer in service 1888–1915
