= Paul Pritchard Shipyard =

Archaeological site in South Carolina, United States

- U.S. National Register of Historic Places
- Nearest city: Mount Pleasant, South Carolina
- Area: 5 acres (2.0 ha)
- Built: c. 1702
- NRHP reference No.: 74001839
- Added to NRHP: September 17, 1974

Paul Pritchard Shipyard, also known as State Shipyard, Rose's Shipyard, and Begbie & Manson's Shipyard, is a historic shipyard site located at Mount Pleasant, Charleston County, South Carolina. The shipyard was in operation as early as 1702, and was the site of an attack made during the French and Spanish invasion of 1706. It was acquired by Paul Pritchard and sold to the commissioners of the South Carolina State Navy in 1778, and was South Carolina's only state shipyard at the time. It was sold back to Pritchard after the American Revolutionary War, who with his son operated it until 1831. It was listed on the National Register of Historic Places in 1974.
