= Active-class frigate =

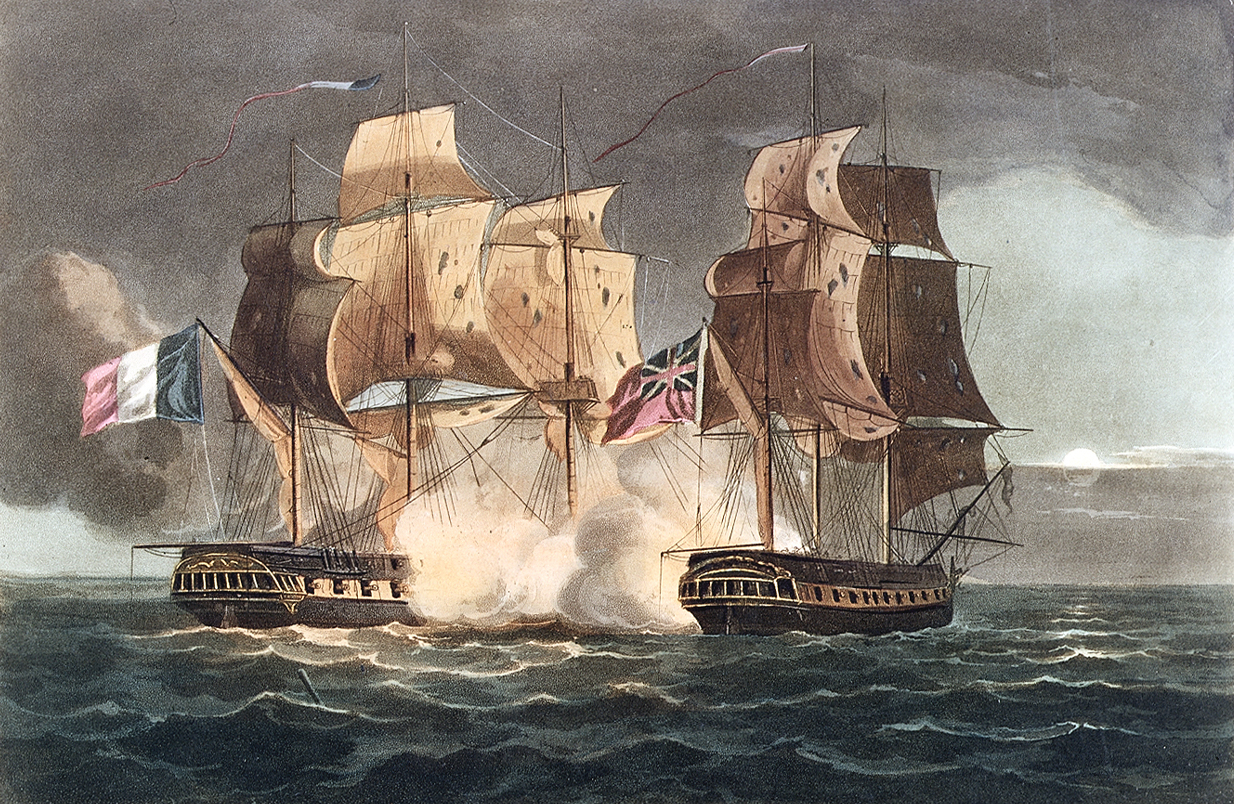
- HMS Astraea captures the Gloire, a print by Thomas Whitcombe

Class overview
- Builders: John Fisher, Liverpool; J. Pollard, Sheerness Dockyard; George Parsons, Bursledon, Hampshire; Robert Fabian, East Cowes
- Operators: United Kingdom
- Preceded by: Amazon class
- Succeeded by: Hermione class
- Built: 1780–1784
- In commission: 1780–1830
- Planned: 8
- Completed: 8
- Lost: 3
- Scrapped: 5

General characteristics
- Type: 32-gun fifth-rate frigate
- Tons burthen: 68929/94 (bm)
- Length: 126 ft 6 1/2 in (38.6 m) (overall); 104 ft 7 1/2 in (31.9 m) (keel)
- Beam: 35 ft 2 1/4 in (10.7 m)
- Draught: 8 ft (2.4 m)
- Depth of hold: 12 ft 1 1/2 in (3.7 m)
- Sail plan: Full-rigged ship
- Complement: 220
- Armament: Upper deck: 26 × 12-pounder guns; QD: 4 × 6-pounder guns + 4 × 18-pounder carronades; Fc: 2 × 6-pounder guns + 2 × 18-pounder carronades

The Active-class frigate was a 32-gun fifth-rate frigate class of eight ships designed by Edward Hunt to replace the Amazon class design, which they resembled with a distinct midsection. Due to poor performance of the Active class, orders continued for the Amazon class.

== Description ==
The Active class was designed with a 126-foot (38 m) gundeck, measuring 103 ft 9 5/8 in (31.639 m) at the keel, 35 ft 4 in (10.77 m) at the beam, and a draught of 12 ft 2 in (3.71 m). They displaced 689 25/94 tons burthen. The class was designed with an armament of 26 12-pounder (5.4 kg) cannon on the gundeck, four 6-pounder (2.7 kg) guns on the quarterdeck with four 24-pounder (11 kg) carronades, and two 6 pdr guns and two 24 pdr carronades on the forecastle.

== Ships in class ==
- HMS Cerberus (1779) - wrecked attempting to exit Castle Harbour, Bermuda, via Castle Roads
- HMS Active (1780) – wrecked on Anticosti Island in the St Lawrence estuary 13 July 1796, abandoned 30 July 1796.
- HMS Daedalus (1780) - broken up July 1811.
- HMS Fox (1780) – broken up 1816
- HMS Astraea (1781) – wrecked on Anegada Island in the Virgin Islands 23 March 1808.
- HMS Ceres (1781) – broken up 1830.
- HMS Quebec (1781) – broken up 1830.
- HMS Mermaid (1784) - broken up November 1815.
