= Isaac Holmes (lieutenant governor) =

American politician

- Born: May 19, 1758; South Carolina, U.S.
- Died: 1812 (aged 53–54); South Carolina, U.S.
- Organization: Politician
- Relatives: John Bee Holmes (half-brother); Isaac E. Holmes (nephew)

Isaac Holmes (May 19, 1758 – 1812) was an early American politician from South Carolina, serving as the 14th lieutenant governor of South Carolina after the Revolution under Governor Charles Pinckney, as well as serving in both the South Carolina House and Senate.

Holmes was the son of Isaac Holmes Jr. and Elizabeth Stanyarne Holmes. His mother died in childbirth. His younger half-brother, John Bee Holmes, was mayor of Charleston in the 1790s. John Bee Holmes's son Isaac E. Holmes (1796–1897) was a Congressman.

During the American Revolutionary War, Holmes served in the Third Provincial Assembly, was a prisoner of war at both St. Augustine and Philadelphia, and was an officer in the Militia prior to the fall of Charleston. Holmes was appointed by George Washington as Collector of Customs at the port of Charleston in 1791 but resigned the position in 1797, on account of his inability to adequately collect delinquent debts. Isaac Holmes held numerous other offices, memberships, and positions, including member of both the St. Andrews and South Carolina Societies, as well as the Charleston Library Society. He died in 1812, in his fifties.

Political offices
Preceded by Alexander Gillon	Lieutenant Governor of South Carolina; 1791–1792	Succeeded by James Ladson
