= Frederick Finch (photographer) =

Frederick Finch (1835–1920) was a New Zealand carpenter and photographer. Finch worked at Green's Dockyards in England and a joiner on ships before emigrating to New Zealand. In New Zealand Finch plied his trade as a carpenter and worked on buildings such as Eichardt's Hotel and Eden Grove. Finch was also an amateur photographer, with his photographs being held in numerous collections — including Te Papa.

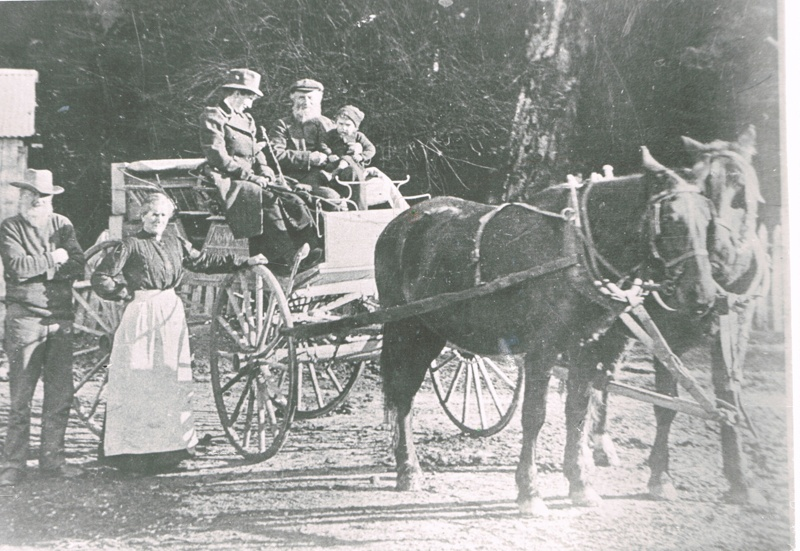
Finch is the man in the carriage with the child on his lap c.1910

== Early life ==
Frederick Finch was born in Rochester, Kent, England in 1836 (Note: Finch's date of birth is unknown but the 1851 census listed his age as 14) to Edward Finch, a postmaster, and Thomazin Hogben. Finch learnt carpentry and joinery and worked as an apprentice at Green's Dockyards in Chatham. (Note: Green's Dockyards was based in Blackwall, London so Chatham may be an error.) Finch worked as a joiner aboard the Prince of Wales and Agamemnon, taking him to Calcutta during the 1857 Indian Rebellion.

== Carpentry ==
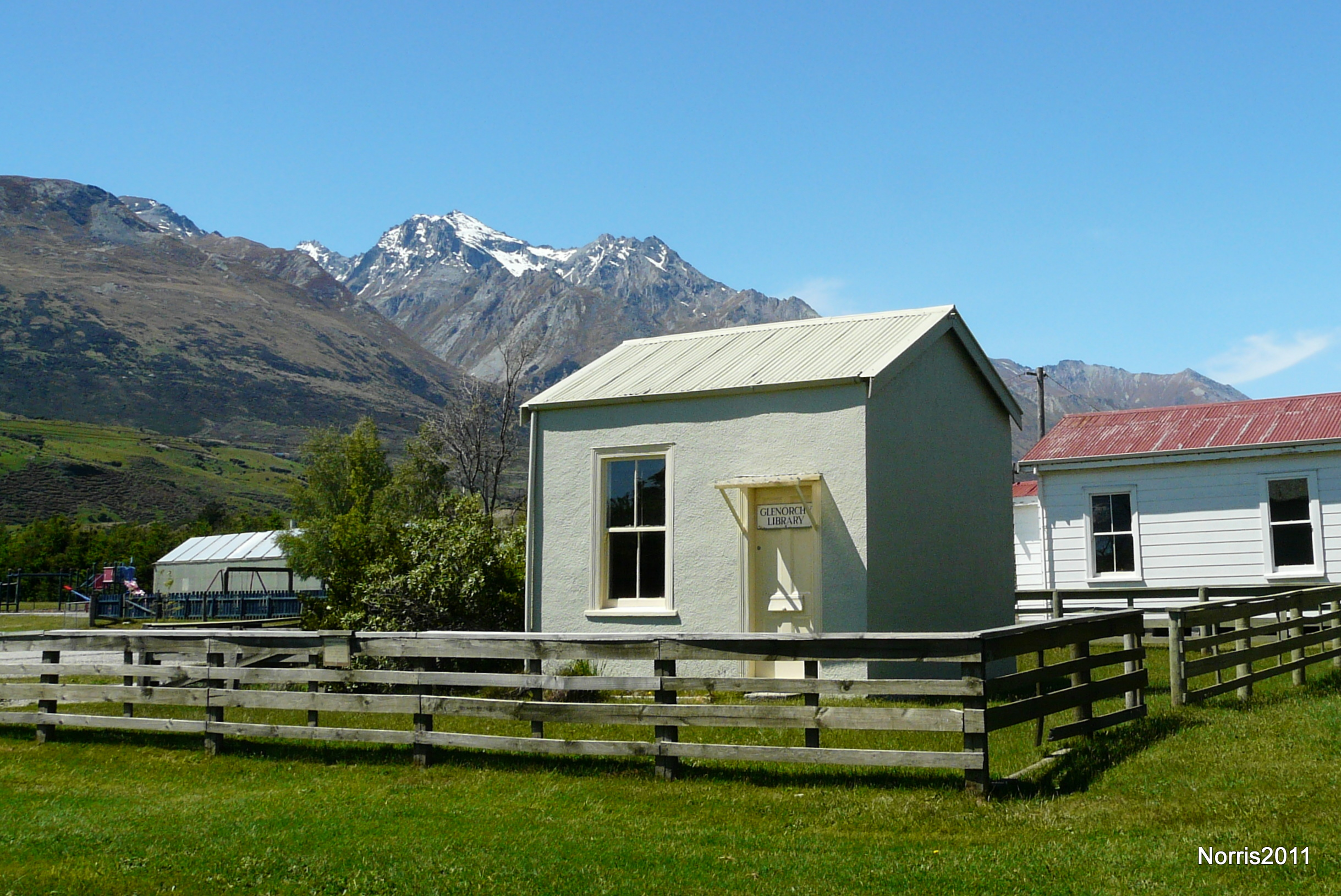
The Glenorchy library was constructed by Finch

Finch travelled to New Zealand c.1870. Finch may have came aboard the Otago. (Note: The Otago arrived 13 October.) Finch travelled from Dunedin to Queenstown. Finch worked as a carpenter in Queenstown, including on Eichardt's Hotel. Despite being robbed of £138 (Note: $20,000 today) Finch obtained a Camp Street section by 1876.

In 1883 Finch was hired by William Mason to build Eden Grove. Finch later worked as a labourer on the property in 1898 before eventually retiring there. Finch continued to ply his trade a carpenter constructing fixtures for the 1900 Queenstown Annual Horticultural and Industrial Show and constructing the Glenorchy library in 1905. (Note: The library is still extant, although no longer in use.) Finch died at the property on 22 December 1920 and was buried in the Glenorchy cemetery. Finch never wed and had no children.

== Photography ==
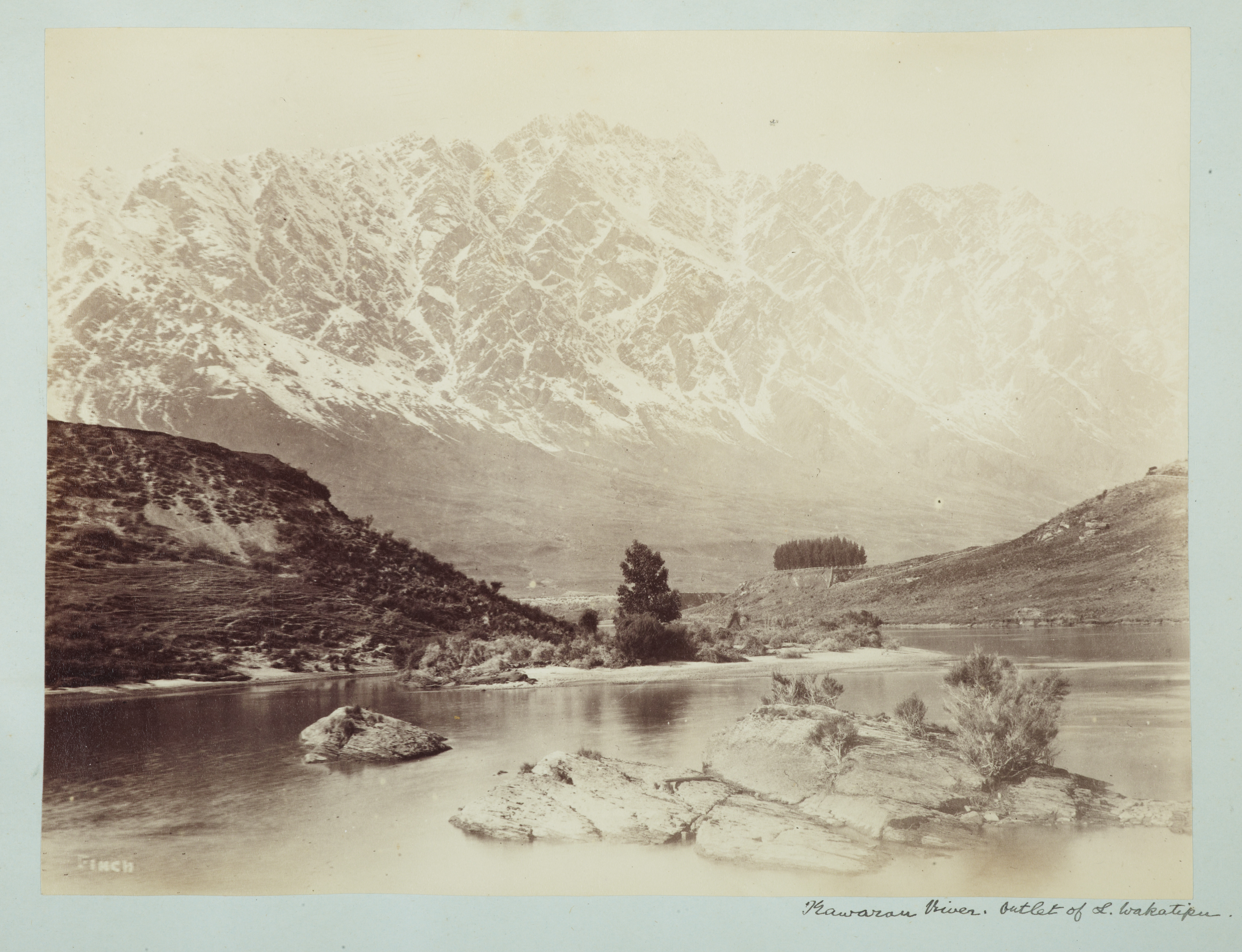
A photograph of the Kawarau River taken by Finch

Finch was an avid photographer and was labelled as a 'clever knight of the camera' (Note: In reference to Sir John Benjamin Stone) in his obituary.

The first recorded instance of Finch's photography is of the 1878 Queenstown flood. Finch published many photographs of Lake County, typically focusing on natural environments over built ones. (Note: Finch has photographed Lake Wakatipu, Mt Alfred, Mt Earnslaw, Dart River, Rees River, Routeburn, Frankton, and Bullendale.) Finch continued to take photographs until 1900.

Finch's works are held by the Alexander Turnbull Library, Glenorchy Museum, Lakes District Museum, Hocken Collections, and Te Papa.
