= Battle of the Delaware Capes =

1782 battle of the American Revolutionary War

- Part of the American Revolutionary War
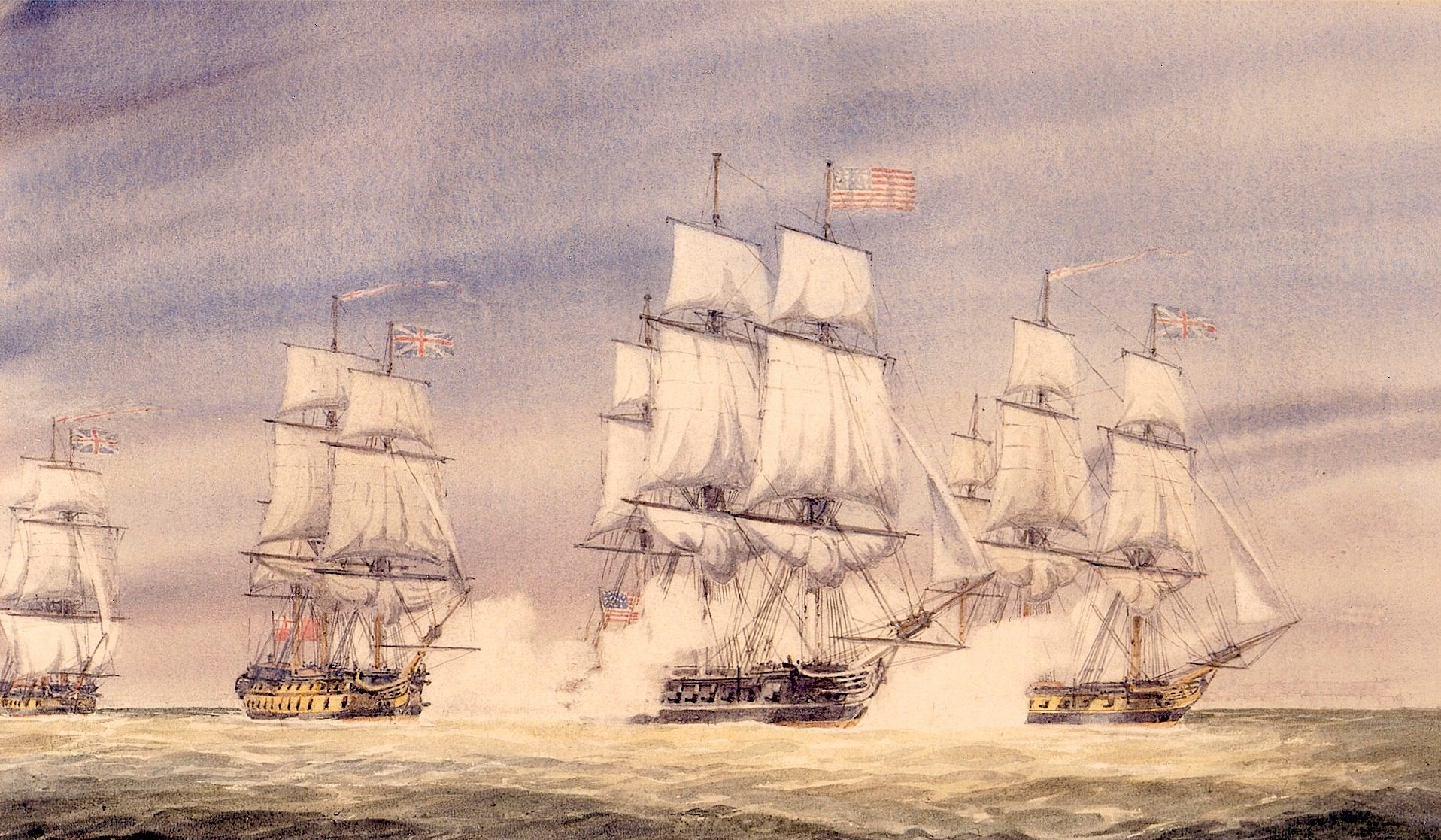
- c. 1925 illustration of the battle
Date	20–21 December 1782
Location	Off the Delaware River, Atlantic Ocean 38.965°N 74.972°W
Result	British victory

Belligerents
Great Britain	United States

Commanders and leaders
Thomas Frederick	John Joyner

Strength
3 frigates	1 frigate 2 brigs 1 schooner

Casualties and losses
None	6 killed 8 wounded 530 captured 1 frigate captured 2 brigs captured

The Battle of the Delaware Capes (also known as the Third Battle of Delaware Bay) was a naval engagement that was fought off the Delaware River towards the end of the American Revolutionary War. The battle took place on 20 and 21 December 1782, some three weeks after the signing of the preliminary articles of peace between Great Britain and the former American colonies. It was fought between three Royal Navy warships HMS Diomede, Quebec and Astraea, that battled the South Carolina State Navy's 40-gun frigate South Carolina and the privateer brigs Hope and Constance and schooner Seagrove. The British were victorious, with only Seagrove escaping capture.

== Background ==
The inactivity of the British, American and French armies meant that the Royal Navy was free to concentrate on enemy trade. One group of British frigates, HMS Diomede under Captain Thomas Frederick and the sister 32-gun frigates — HMS Quebec under Captain Christopher Mason and HMS Astraea under Captain Matthew Squires — was blockading the Delaware Bay. On 20 December 1782 they spotted a number of American ships coming out of the bay and chased after them. Frederick was told by the officer of watch that one of the vessels was a large frigate. This was the 40-gun South Carolina of the South Carolina State Navy.

South Carolina, under Captain John Joyner, was built at Amsterdam in 1780. She originally was named Indien and belonged to France, but was sold to the South Carolina State Navy. The ship was the most heavily armed American warship of the Revolutionary War. Joyner was attempting to dash out of Philadelphia, Pennsylvania, through the British blockade on 19 December with several vessels. As well as the large South Carolina, the privateer 10-gun brig Hope, commanded by John Prole and carrying tobacco and flour; another privateer brig Constance, under Commander Jesse Harding; and the 6-gun schooner Seagrove, under Captain Benjamin Bradhurst, had joined them for protection. On 19 December Seagrove hailed a merchant vessel entering the river. Her master learned that three large sail had been seen patrolling off the Cape May Channel. With this information Joyner decided to proceed down the main channel and go straight out into the ocean. In the early evening of 20 December, the four vessels sailed down the channel and out into the Atlantic.

== Battle ==
Between 2200 and 2230hrs the Americans sighted three large British warships at about the same time the British sighted the Americans. Five hours out in the cruise, South Carolina and Hope turned south and two of the British frigates turned after them. Seagrove turned north, with Diomede in pursuit. She got close enough to fire a few shots, but the schooner sent out boats and towed into the wind. Eventually Diomede turned south to continue the main pursuit, letting Seagrove get away. Whilst Diomede was chasing Seagrove, Constance, having never strayed from her course, had continued east and surrendered to Quebec and Astraea without pointless resistance. The British pursuit of South Carolina then continued through the night.

At sunrise the nearest British ship was about two and a half miles behind South Carolina. Hope passed South Carolina at least once during the pursuit, even though Hope was slower before the wind. Joyner suggested that Prole tow Hope around the British and make the pursuit into a rowing match, but Prole rejected the advice. By 1300hrs the British took Hope under fire and she surrendered after having nearly collided with one of the British frigates. This now left just South Carolina, which was only a mile in front of the British ships once Hope had surrendered.

The pursuers skillfully took up position to limit South Carolina's options in trying to get away and the British windward ship attempted to mask the South Carolina's wind. For eighteen hours the British chased South Carolina. When she came in range, she fired her stern chasers at Diomede, which returned fire from her bow-guns. By 1500hrs the British ships were close enough to exchange shots and could each yaw, fire a broadside, and return to the chase while preventing South Carolina from doing the same. The first of the British broadsides did major damage to South Carolina, leading Joyner to call his officers together to discuss whether to fight or to continue the flight. The decision was to continue the latter. By 1700hrs Quebec and Diomede came up alongside South Carolina, with Astraea behind in support, together with Hope and Constance. The British were soon in position to fire six broadsides, five from the Diomede and the other from the Quebec, all aimed at South Carolina's masts, sails and rigging, which within two hours were in tatters.

Joyner, now seeing the hopelessness of South Carolina's situation, decided to fire her guns one last time, not wishing to surrender with his cannon loaded. He then struck, ending the battle. The British took possession of South Carolina and transferred their prisoners over to the British ships.

== Aftermath ==
The British had suffered no casualties, and damage to their three frigates was light, most damage being to masts and rigging. South Carolina had a crew of about 466 men when captured, of whom she had lost six killed and eight wounded. Hope had 42 crewmen. Constance, with another 30 men, brought the total number of American prisoners to nearly 530. Fifty German and eight British prisoners that the Americans had recruited out of captivity in Philadelphia were released, as they had once served as soldiers in General John Burgoyne's army. Because of the number of men involved, the British treated their American prisoners strictly, locking them under hatches and not allowing more than two to come up on deck at the same time.

Prize crews then took South Carolina, Hope, and Constance to New York where all three vessels were tried and condemned. The Royal Navy did not purchase South Carolina; the war was ending and with it the need for a large navy, and South Carolina's design had flaws. Instead, she was sold for service as a merchantman. Prize money for the captured vessels was awarded in 1784.

== Order of battle ==
American ships:

- South Carolina, frigate, flagship
- Hope, brig
- Constance, brig
- Seagrove, schooner

Royal Navy:

- HMS Diomede, frigate, flagship
- HMS Quebec, frigate
- HMS Astraea, frigate
