= Thomas Frederick (Royal Navy officer) =

Rear-Admiral Thomas Frederick
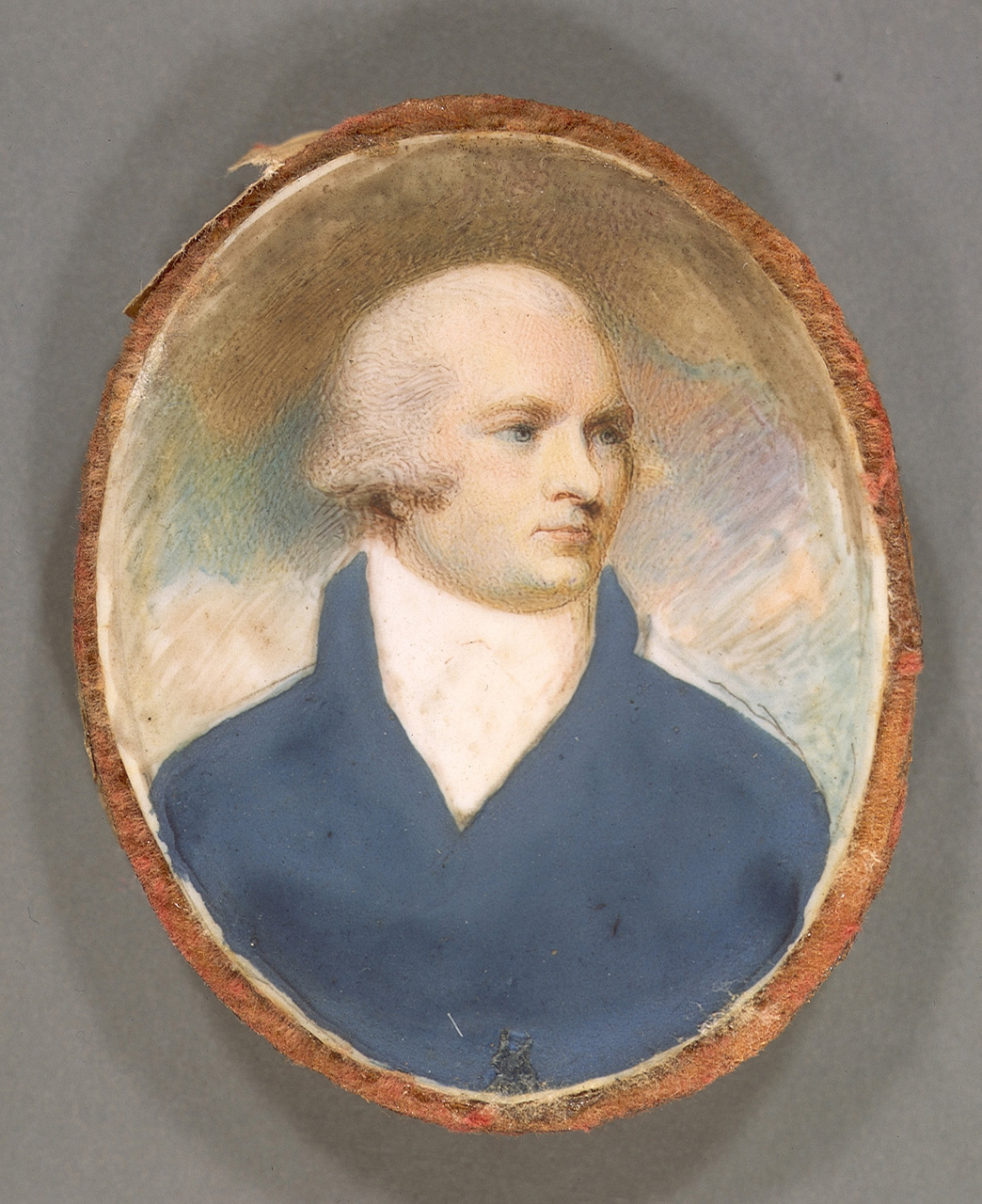
- Admiral Thomas L. Frederick, 1799, by Robert Bowyer.
- Born: 25 March 1750; St George Hanover Square, London
- Died: 7 October 1799 (aged 49); Nottingham Place, London
- Relatives: Sir Charles Frederick (father)
- Military career
- Allegiance: Great Britain
- Branch: Royal Navy
- Service years: 1770 – 1799
- Rank: Rear-Admiral of the Red
- Commands: HMS Spy; HMS Swift; HMS Fairy; HMS Unicorn; HMS Diomede; HMS Romulus; HMS Illustrious; HMS Blenheim
- Conflicts: American War of Independence; French Revolutionary Wars; Siege of Toulon; Battle of Genoa; Battle of Cape St Vincent

Rear-Admiral Thomas Lennox Frederick (25 March 1750 – 7 October 1799) was a Royal Navy officer who served in the American War of Independence and French Revolutionary Wars. He was a highly educated officer and a very greatly esteemed seaman, rising to the rank of rear-admiral of the red.

== Early life ==
He was born on 25 March 1750, in the parish of St George's, Hanover Square. He was the son of Sir Charles Frederick, the Surveyor-General of the Ordnance, and Lucy Boscawen. His grandfather was Sir John Frederick. Thomas first went to sea in 1768, under Captain Peter Parker.

== American War of Independence ==
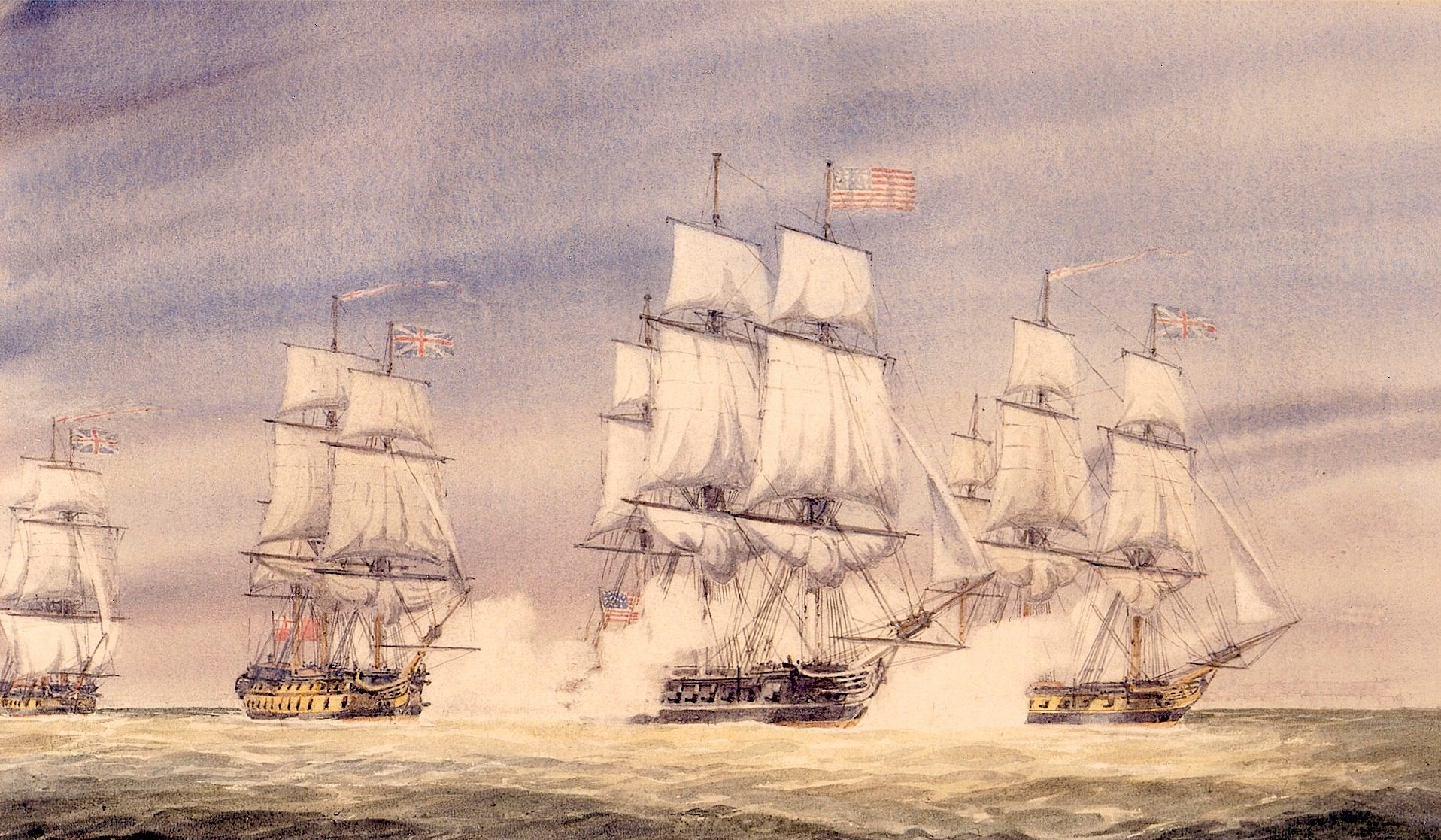
The Battle of the Delaware Capes

From October 1776 to 1779, he commanded successively HMS Spy, HMS Swift, HMS Fairy, and after having been promoted to post-captain, he was appointed to command HMS Unicorn. On 4 September 1780 he was in command of Unicorn when he had the misfortune of encountering, in a fog off Tortuga, a French frigate and two ships of the line that captured him. The subsequent court martial honourably acquitted Frederick for the loss of his ship, and in October 1781 he received command of the 44-gun frigate HMS Diomede. On 20 December 1782, during the Battle of the Delaware Capes Frederick, along with HMS Quebec, captured the 40-gun American frigate South Carolina after a chase of eighteen hours on the Delaware River.

== Years of peace ==
From May 1790 to September 1791 Thomas Frederick commanded the 44-gun HMS Romulus.

== French Revolutionary Wars ==
On the outbreak of the French Revolutionary Wars, he was appointed to HMS Illustrious, a 74-gun third rate. He was present with Admiral Lord Hood at the Siege of Toulon, and as a commanding officer of his ship, he saw action at the Battle of Genoa against the French fleet. His ship fought two French third rates, defeating both of them, and was so damaged that HMS Meleager had to take her in tow. She was then caught in a storm on her return to port and grounded. Although other British vessels arrived they were unable to get her off. The British set her on fire and abandoned her.

Frederick's next command, in June 1795, was the 90-gun HMS Blenheim, which took part in the long blockade off Toulon. While in command he saw action at the Battle of Cape Saint Vincent, where the outnumbered British squadron under Sir John Jervis defeated the Spanish fleet. After taking a convoy to Lisbon, Frederick joined Jervis, Earl St. Vincent, on the resumption of the blockade of Cadiz.

Frederick was promoted to rear-admiral of the blue on 20 February 1797. In the autumn of 1798 he returned to Great Britain and later that year he raised his flag in the 98-gun HMS Prince George. He later commanded the 90-gun HMS Princess Royal, which paid off in September 1799. Unfortunately, Frederick's health had severely deteriorated and he died on 7 October 1799 in Nottingham Place, London.
