= Prince of Wales (1815 ship) =

UK merchant ship and whaler (1815–1833

History

United Kingdom
- Name: Prince of Wales
- Namesake: Prince of Wales
- Launched: "Old", in France
- Acquired: 1815 by purchase of a prize
- Fate: Last listed 1833

General characteristics
- Tons burthen: 265 (LR), or 276 RS (bm)

Prince of Wales was a French prize that first appeared in British records in 1815. She became a West Indiaman and then made three voyages as a whaler in the southern whale fishery. She returned to mercantile service and was last listed in 1833.

== Career ==
Prince of Wales first appeared in Lloyd's Register (LR) in 1815.

| Year | Master | Owner | Trade | Source & notes |
|---|---|---|---|---|
| 1815 | M'William | Hawker & Co. | Plymouth–London | LR |
| 1816 | M'William | Hawker & Co. | Plymouth–London; Plymouth–West Indies | LR; large repair 1816 |
| 1818 | M'William | Hawker & Co. | Plymouth–West Indies | LR; large repair 1816 |
| 1819 | Hathaway | Hawker & Co. | Plymouth–South Seas | LR; large repairs 1816 & small repairs 1819; hogged |

1st whaling voyage (1818–1819): Captain George Hathaway sailed from Plymouth on 1 May 1818, bound for the "South Seas". He returned on 4 May 1819.

2nd whaling voyage (1820–1821): Captain Hathaway sailed from Plymouth on 30 June 1820, bound for the Brazil Banks, Walvis Bay, and Saldana Bay. He returned on 3 February 1821.

| Year | Master | Owner | Trade | Source & notes |
|---|---|---|---|---|
| 1821 | Hathaway | Hawker & Co. | Plymouth–South Seas | LR; small repairs 1819; hogged |
| 1823 | Hathaway | J.Hawker | Plymouth–South Seas | RS; large repair 1816 & 1819, & good repair 1821 |

3rd whaling voyage (1821–1823): Captain Hathaway sailed from Plymouth on 22 April 1821, bound for Walvis Bay and the Brazil Banks. Prince of Wales returned on 18 February 1823.

| Year | Master | Owner | Trade | Source & notes |
|---|---|---|---|---|
| 1825 | Smith | J.&J. Black | Shields–London | RS; thorough repair 1823 |

On her return from whaling new owners employed Prince of Wales in the coastal trade. On 28 September 1823 Prince of Wales, Smith, master, stopped at Newcastle, having come from London. She was leaky after having grounded in the Thames.

| Year | Master | Owner | Trade | Source & notes |
|---|---|---|---|---|
| 1827 | Smith | J.& J. Black | Newcastle–London | RS; thorough repair 1823 |

The Register of Shipping continued to carry Prince of Wales with data unchanged from 1827 until the register ceased publication in 1833. Lloyd's Register had ceased carrying Prince of Wales shortly after the change of ownership to J.&J. Black, but without acknowledging the change.
