= Frederick Finch (cricketer) =

English cricketer

Frederick Francis Finch (c. 1830 – 5 May 1892) was an English cricketer who made one first-class cricket appearance for Kent County Cricket Club in 1862. He was christened at East Grinstead in Sussex on 12 December 1830.

Finch made his only first-class appearance for Kent against Yorkshire at Cranbrook in July 1862. He married Amelia Southon on 11 May 1852 and the couple had nine children. He died at Sevenoaks in Kent in May 1892 aged 62.

== Bibliography ==
- Carlaw, Derek (2020). Kent County Cricketers, A to Z: Part One (1806–1914) (PDF). Cardiff: ACS.
