= HMS Diomede (1781) =

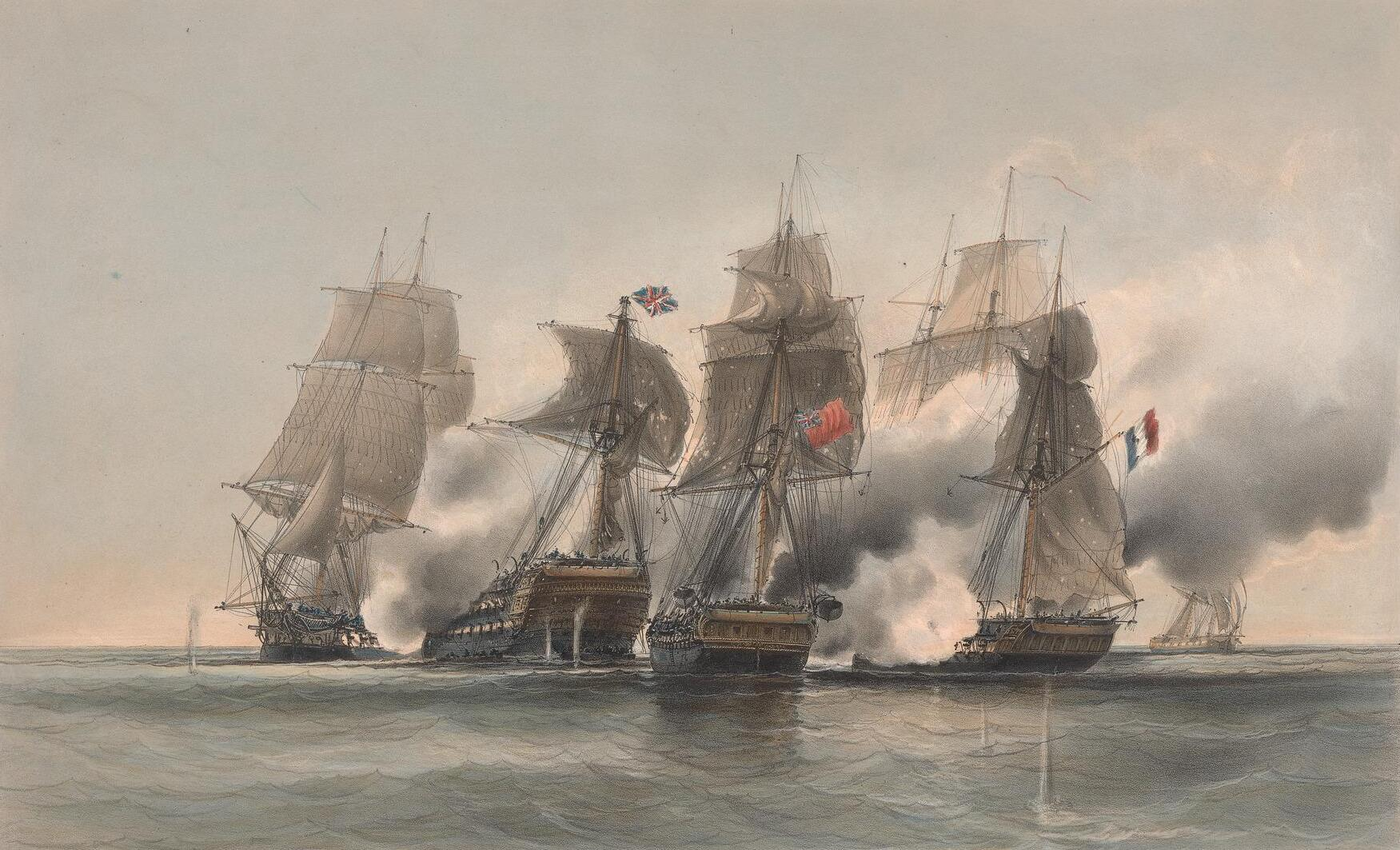
- Diomede at the Battle of Île Ronde

History

Great Britain
- Name: HMS Diomede
- Ordered: 14 August 1779
- Builder: James Martin Hillhouse, Bristol
- Laid down: March 1780
- Launched: 18 October 1781
- Completed: 14 March 1782
- Fate: Struck a rock on 2 August 1795 and sank almost immediately

General characteristics
- Class & type: 44-gun Roebuck-class two-decker fifth rate
- Tons burthen: 887 37/94 (bm)
- Length: 140 ft (42.7 m) (overall); 115 ft 6 in (35.2 m) (keel)
- Beam: 38 ft 2 1/2 in (11.6 m)
- Depth of hold: 16 ft 4 in (5.0 m)
- Sail plan: Full-rigged ship
- Complement: 300
- Armament: As built: Upper deck: 22 × 9-pounder guns; Lower deck: 20 × 18-pounder guns; Fc: 2 × 6-pounder guns

HMS Diomede was a 44-gun fifth-rate warship of the Royal Navy designed by the shipwright James Martin Hillhouse and launched at Bristol on 18 October 1781. She belonged to the Roebuck class of vessels specially built during the American Revolutionary War for service in the shallow American coastal waters. As a two-decker, she had two complete batteries of guns, one on the upper deck and the other on the lower deck.

Diomede participated in two major actions. The first occurred in 1782 when she captured South Carolina of the South Carolina Navy. The second, the Battle of Île Ronde, took place in 1794 in the Indian Ocean. Although the action in the Indian Ocean was inconclusive and the French broke off contact after suffering much heavier casualties than the British, the French did succeed in breaking the blockade of Île de France and saved it from starvation.

Diomede was wrecked in 1795 off Trincomalee during the British invasion of Ceylon.

== Career ==
In October 1781 Diomede was commissioned under Captain Thomas L. Frederick. On 8 June 1782 he sailed her for North America.

=== Capture of South Carolina ===
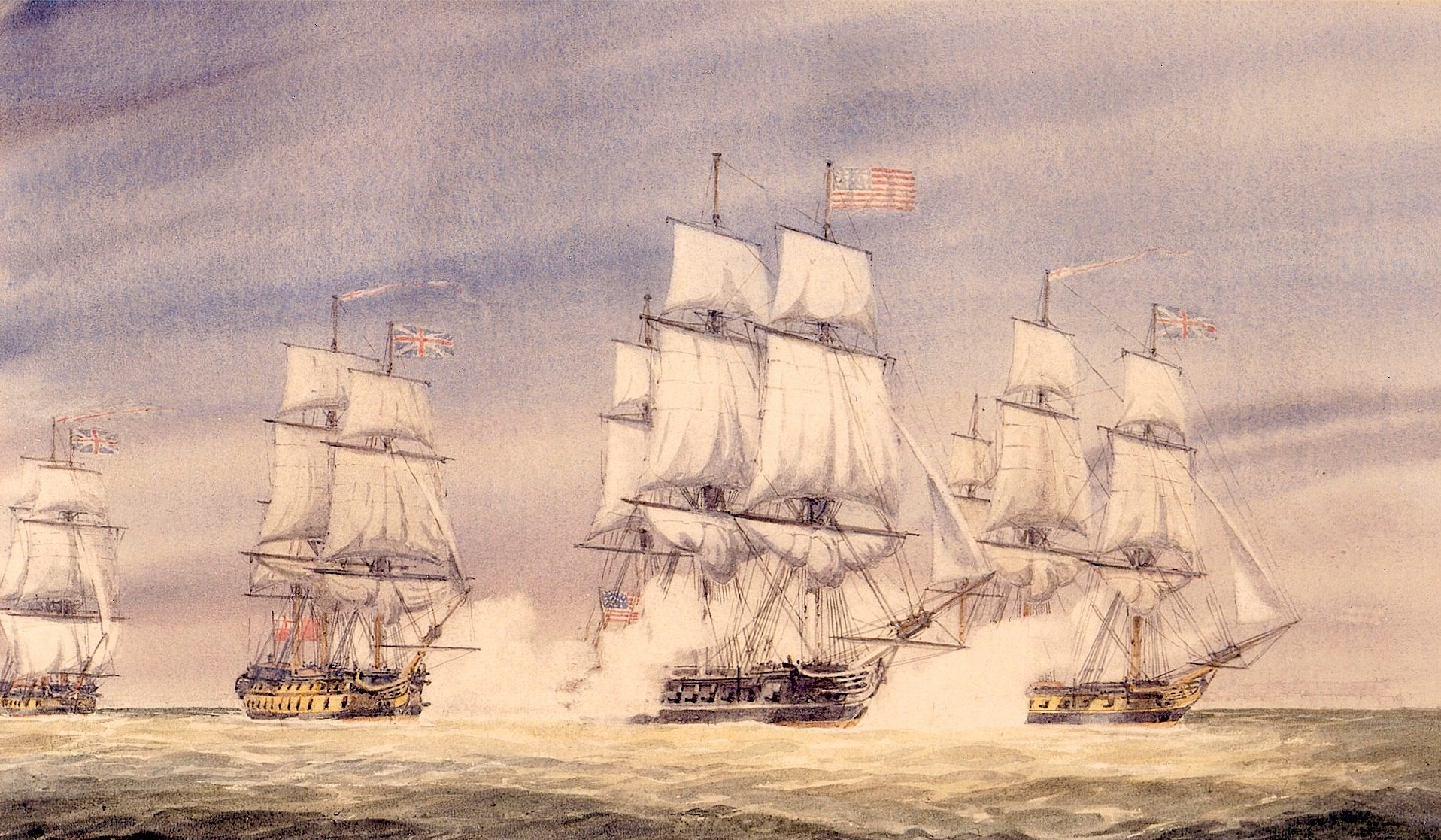
Capture of the American frigate South Carolina by the British frigates Diomede, Quebec and Astrea

On 20 December 1782 Diomede, and the sister 32-gun frigates – Quebec, Captain Christopher Mason, and Astraea, Captain Matthew Squires – captured the South Carolina Navy's frigate South Carolina in the Delaware River. South Carolina, under Captain John Joyner, was attempting to dash out of Philadelphia, Pennsylvania, through the British blockade. She was in the company of the brig Constance, schooner Seagrove and the ship Hope, which had joined her for protection.

The British chased South Carolina for 18 hours and fired on her for two hours before she struck. She had a crew of about 466 men when captured, of whom she had lost six killed or wounded. The British suffered no casualties.

Astraea and Quebec also captured Hope and Constance, which was carrying tobacco. Prize crews then took South Carolina, Hope, and Constance to New York. Seagrove escaped. Prize money was paid in 1784.

Diomede was paid off in December 1783, after the end of the war. She was recommissioned in March 1793 under Captain Matthew Smith. On 17 November 1793, Smith sailed Diomede for the East Indies.

=== Battle of Île Ronde ===
A year later Diomede was with the British 50-gun ship Centurion, Captain Samuel Osborne, in a blockade of Île de France. She took part in the Battle of Île Ronde when the senior French naval officer there, Commodore Jean-Marie Renaud, decided to try to break the blockade.

=== Malacca station ===
On 5 February 1795 Rainier sent Diomede and Heroine to take station between Malacca and the north-west end of Banda Island. They were to stay there until all the trade from the eastward had passed. Diomede was then to return to Madras via the Sunda Straits and Heroine via the Strait of Malacca.

== Fate ==
On 23 July Diomede joined a squadron under Commodore Peter Rainier consisting of Suffolk, Hobart, Centurion, with troop transports, to participate in the British invasion of Ceylon.

On 2 August 1795 Diomede was towing a transport brig when she struck a sunken rock in Black Bay and sank. She was working into the bay against a strong land wind when she hit the rock, which her charts showed as being a half-mile further north. She went down with all her stores on board and there was barely enough time for her crew to save themselves.

Although the loss of Diomede delayed the landing by a day, on 31 August the British captured Fort Ostenburg, and with it Trincomalee. The British would go on to capture the rest of Dutch Ceylon, but denying Trincomalee to the French was the most important objective.

== Post script ==
In his report on the action of 22 October 1794, Osborne wrote critically of Smith's conduct. Smith asked Osborne for an explanation. Osborne replied even more critically and demanded a court martial to examine Smith's command of the two frigates. The resulting court martial dismissed Smith from the Navy. The issue was not a lack of courage but rather Smith's dislike and jealousy of Osborne. When Smith returned to Britain in 1798 he appealed the sentence. His dismissal was rescinded due to irregularities in the proceedings and he was restored to his rank. However, the Admiralty never again called him into service.
