= South Carolina Navy =

State navy of South Carolina

South Carolina State Navy
- The ensign of the South Carolina State Navy
- Active: 1775–1780; 1861–1865
- Country: United Colonies; United States; Confederate States of America
- Branch: Navy
- Engagements: American Revolutionary War; Siege of Charleston; Capture of the Bahamas (1782); Battle of the Delaware Capes; American Civil War

Commanders
- Notable commanders: Alexander Gillon

The South Carolina State Navy was the state navy of South Carolina during the American Revolutionary War. It was founded in July 1775 as a means to attack British ships and colonies for the purpose of acquiring military supplies. Patriot authorities in South Carolina acquired several merchantmen and converted them into warships, along with purchasing the Paul Pritchard Shipyard and establishing admiralty courts and a board of naval commissioners. The most prominent engagement the state navy fought in was the siege of Charleston, which was a crushing defeat for the navy. The South Carolina State Navy was disbanded in 1783 when its last ships were sold.

== American Revolutionary War ==
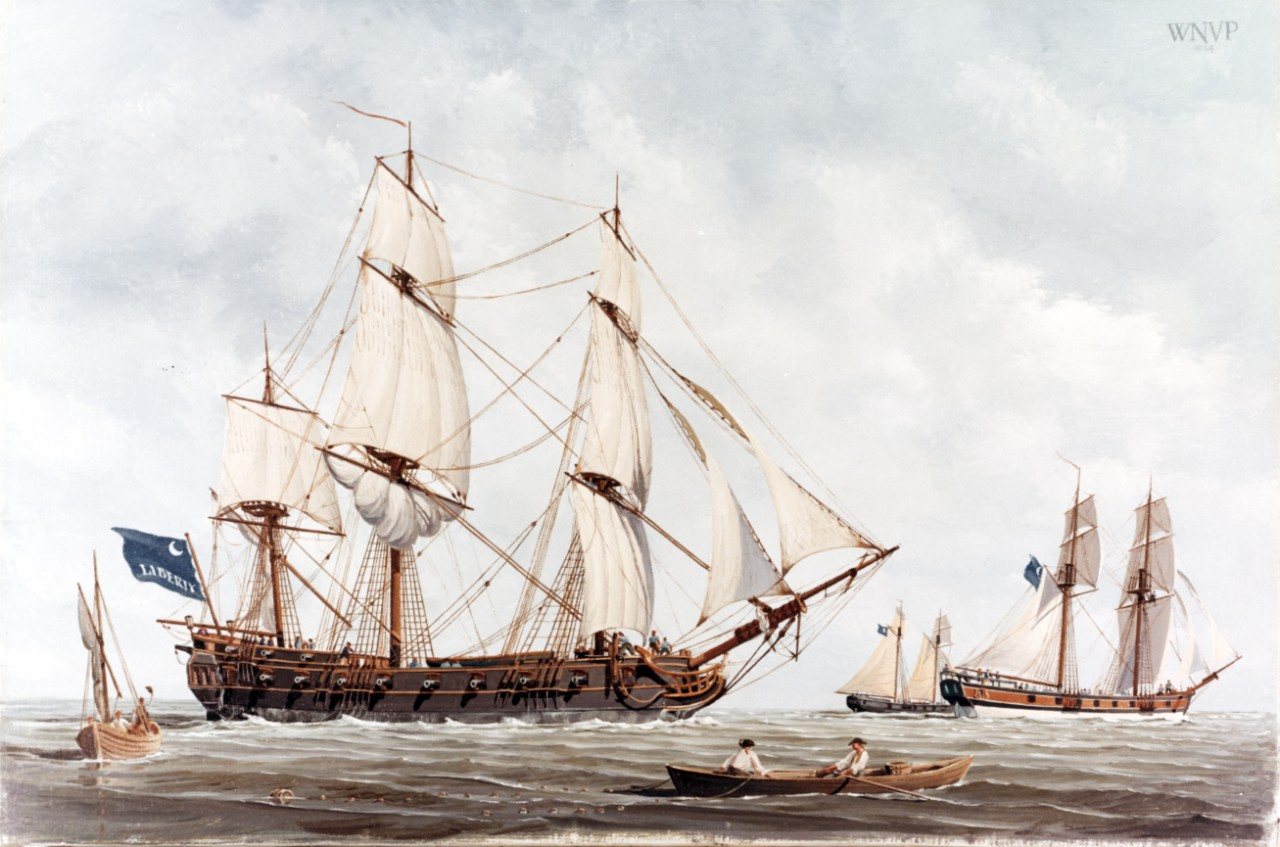
Painting of Prosper, Comet and Defence by William Nowland Van Powell

South Carolina's first naval actions of the American Revolutionary War occurred in July 1775, when the province's Council of Safety hired two captains to assist Georgia in the capture of British ships carrying arms and gunpowder. That month the council also hired a ship, Commerce, for the purpose of acquiring gunpowder that the British had stored at Nassau in the Bahamas. She was outfitted for this purpose, but word of the anticipated arrival of British ships carrying arms and gunpowder at Savannah, Georgia prompted her to be used to capture those ships instead. These activities netted the colonial cause more than 25,000 pounds of gunpowder. In October 1775, the council acquired the schooner Defence, and hired Simon Tufts as her captain. After she had a brief exchange with British ships in Charleston harbor in November, the provincial congress voted to seize Prosper to assist in driving the British ships away, and established a commission to oversee naval affairs.

In December, a third ship, Comet, was added to the fleet, and the council sent Robert Cochran to recruit experienced seamen in Massachusetts. As Boston was at the time under siege by George Washington's newly formed Continental Army, Massachusetts authorized him to recruit up to 300 men, provided he offered moderate wages so as to not compete with local needs.

The provincial congress in early 1776 authorized committees in other provincial ports to acquire ships and men for local defense, and fixed pay scales and ranks for state land and naval forces. In March 1776 the schooner Peggy entered the state service. In the following months the congress, now operating under a new constitution, passed laws establishing admiralty courts and providing for the appointment of ship captains. Captains were to be chosen by the legislature, with commissions issued by the state president. On October 8 the legislature established a Board of Naval Commissioners to oversee the state's naval affairs, including the purchase, outfitting, and manning of ships, and the management of its shipyards. This organizational structure survived until February 1780, when the state legislature repealed all previously established laws respecting the naval establishment.

Throughout 1777 and 1778 the state acquired property for shipyards, and brought more ships into service. This included the Paul Pritchard Shipyard at Mount Pleasant, South Carolina. This activity picked up pace when the British captured Savannah late in 1778, bringing the war closer to the state. When it became clear the British were going to make a second attempt on Charleston in 1780, the state procured additional ships, and the naval defense of Charleston was passed to Continental Navy captain Abraham Whipple. Most of the state's ships were lost during the siege of Charleston, and only a few small ships were commissioned after the tide of battle turned against the British in 1781. One ship that survived the loss of Charleston was the frigate South Carolina, which was at sea at the time.

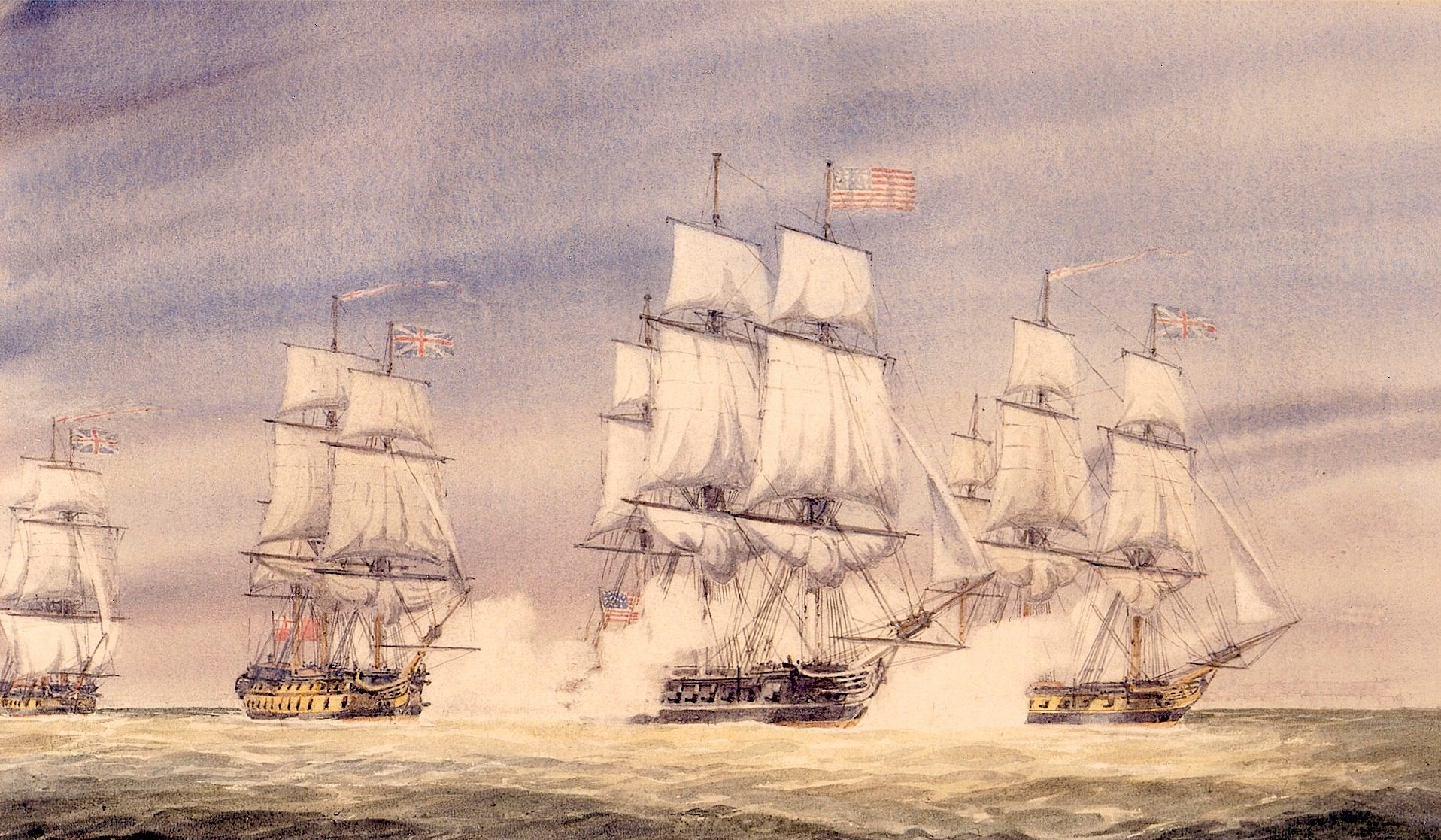
The 1782 Battle of the Delaware Capes

Commodore Alexander Gillon had procured South Carolina in Europe, the state having ordered her in March 1778. Previously named Indien, she was chartered from the Chevalier de Luxembourg for a three-year period. The charter agreement provided that prize money was to be divided between the officers and crew (½), South Carolina (¼), and the Chevalier Luxembourg (¼). On her way from Europe to South Carolina she captured several prizes, and she participated in the 1782 capturing of the Bahamas with the Spanish fleet. She was captured in December 1782, and the financial terms Gillon agreed to concerning prize distribution and indemnification of the Chevalier de Luxembourg for its loss bedeviled the state's finances for years.

Additionally, the Navy included frigates, Rattlesnake, Bricole, and Truite (26), the brigs Notre Dame (16), and Comet; also General Moultrie (20). Bricole, Truite, Notre Dame and General Moultrie all participated in the defense of Charleston in early 1780.

Bricole was a flûte built by Jean-Joseph Ginoux and launched around April 19, 1764. In September 1779 she sank in the Savannah River but was refloated. The next month the French ceded her to the South Carolina government. The South Carolinians wanted to convert her to a frigate of 44 guns, but then gave up the idea and made her a floating battery instead. As such she was armed with fourteen 12-pounder guns on her lower deck and twenty-two 8-pounder guns on her upper deck. In March 1780 she was sunk in front of Charleston, South Carolina to impede the entry of British vessels.

Truite was a French vessel built to plans by Jean-Joseph Ginoux and built and launched at Le Havre on May 9, 1777. The French transferred her to the South Carolina Navy in December 1779. By March 1780 she was a frigate of 26 guns. She was sunk in the Copper River to prevent a British squadron from sailing up the river.

== American Civil War ==
In 1861, the South Carolina Navy gunboat Posed served as the flagship of Commodore Josiah Tattnall III's Savannah Defense Squadron, accompanied by a squadron consisting of CSS Lady Davis, CSS Savannah, CSS Sampson, and CSS Resolute.

On May 11, 1862, in the face of advancing Union forces, Tattnall ordered the destruction of his flagship, CSS Virginia. He was later acquitted by a court-martial of all charges stemming from that action. He resumed command of the Georgia Navy on May 29, 1862, and retained it until 31 March 1863, when he turned over command of forces afloat to Commander Richard L. Page and concentrated upon the shore defenses of Savannah. When Savannah fell to General William Tecumseh Sherman's troops, Tattnall became a prisoner of war.

He was paroled on May 9, 1865, and, soon thereafter, took up residence once more in Savannah.

== South Carolina Naval Militia ==
After the American Civil War, states maintained both army and naval militias. During the Spanish–American War, the South Carolina Naval Militia was federalized and deployed aboard several United States Navy vessels. In 2003, the state of South Carolina reactivated the naval militia under the South Carolina Maritime Security Act.
