= HMS Quebec (1781) =

Royal Navy sailing frigate

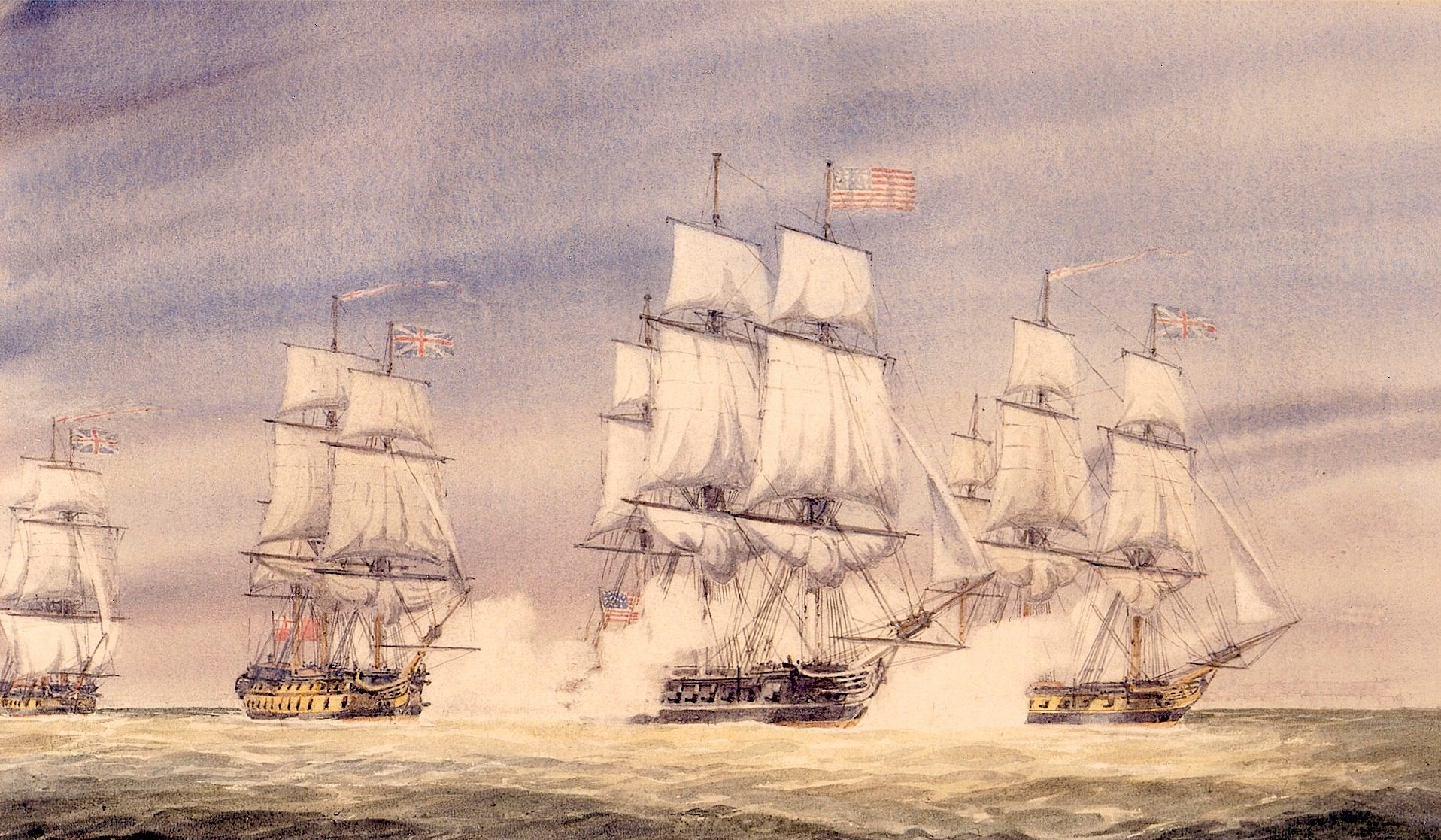
- Capture of the American frigate South Carolina by the British frigates Diomede, Quebec and Astrea

History

Great Britain
- Name: HMS Quebec
- Ordered: 15 September 1779
- Builder: George Parsons, on the Hamble River at Bursledon, Hampshire.
- Launched: 24 May 1781
- Decommissioned: 1812
- Honours and awards: Naval General Service Medal (NGSM), with clasp "2 Aug. Boat Service 1811"
- Fate: Sold in July 1816 for breaking up.

General characteristics
- Class & type: 32-gun Active-class frigate
- Tons burthen: 700 tons
- Sail plan: Frigate
- Complement: 250
- Armament: 32

HMS Quebec was a 32-gun fifth-rate frigate launched in 1781 and broken up in 1816. She sailed under various captains, participating in the American Revolutionary War, the French Revolutionary Wars, and the Napoleonic Wars. During these wars she captured many enemy merchantmen and smaller privateers. One action led to her men qualifying for clasp to the Naval General Service Medal.

== American Revolutionary War ==
Throughout 1782, Christopher Mason commanding, HMS Quebec operated in North American waters in the final year of the American Revolutionary War. On 22 February that year she captured the schooner Betsy, and in April two ships laden with flour, oil, bale goods, salt and wine.

On 3 June HMS Bellisarius and Quebec captured the privateer Pilgrim.

On 20 December Quebec was involved when Diomede and Astraea captured the American frigate South Carolina, for which she shared in prize money awarded eighteen months later.

== French Revolutionary Wars ==
In 1793 Admiral John MacBride became commander-in-chief on the Downs station, commanding a frigate squadron with his flag in Cumberland, later transferring his flag to Quebec. He took possession of Ostend after the French retreat in early 1793, and in October transported reinforcements under General Sir Charles Grey to assist in the defence of Dunkirk. In late October 1793 much needed reinforcements and artillery supplies were landed by Quebec at Nieuport, which was then being besieged by French forces, a relief force from Ostend arrived, and the French withdrew.

From March 1794 a taskforce under Vice-Admiral Sir John Jervis, with land forces under General Sir Charles Grey, operated against French possessions in the Leeward Islands of the Caribbean Sea. Quebec was an active participant, supplying some of the assault forces at Martinique (late March) where she lost one man killed. St Lucia fell on 4 April, whereupon Quebec (under Captain Josias Rogers), Blanche, Ceres and Rose were ordered to seize the smaller islands, the Saints, which they did without loss on 5 April.

Parts of Guadeloupe fell to the British on 23 April 1794 with Quebec playing her part, and many enemy ships were captured as they attempted to leave the anchorage. Details of prize monies awarded for the capture of engineering and ordnance stores on Martinique, St Lucia and Guadeloupe named Quebec and thirty other warships, plus six gunboats. (Note: The ships listed are HMS Asia, Assurance, Avenger, Boyne, Beauleau, Blonde, Bull Dog, Ceres, Dromedary, Experiment, Irresistible, Inspector, Nautilus, Quebec, Roebuck, Rattlesnake, Rose, Retort, Santa Margarita, Solebay, Seaflower, Terpsichore, Ulysses, Undaunted, Vengeance, Veteran, Vesuvius, Winchelsea, Wooolwich (sic), and Zebra – and the gunboats Spiteful, Teazer, Tickler, Tormentor, Venom and Vexor.)

On 12 August 1794 a French ship, Adelle, was captured, for which prize money was awarded a year later.

Actions against Grenada the following year in response to Fédon's rebellion did not go so well. Rogers reported on 9 April 1795 persistent heavy rain had caused delays in the military operations on Grenada. Seemingly in desperation, an assault was made on the last stronghold of the French in the mountains, but the French repulsed the attack, causing heavy British casualties.

In 1796, Quebec – now under the command of Captain John Cooke, Rogers having died of yellow fever in April 1795 - was in home waters, reporting from Spithead the capture of a French national cutter Aspic, off the Scilly Isles. Aspic had a crew of 57 men and carried 10 guns. She was ten days out of Saint-Malo and had captured the sloop John, of and from Galway, sailing to Porto. (Note: Aspic had been launched in 1793 at Cherbourg as the Montagne-class cutter Marat, renamed Anguille in May 1795, and Aspic in December.)

Quebec was soon back in the Caribbean on the Jamaica station. On 3 December 1796 she captured the French corvette 'Affricaine, of 18 guns, near St Domingo.

On 18 April 1797 Vice-Admiral Sir Hyde Parker, who commanded the Jamaica station, ordered Captain Hugh Pigot to take his frigate Hermione, as well as the frigates Quebec and Mermaid, the brig Drake and the hired armed cutters Penelope to cut out 14 vessels at the Battle of Jean-Rabel, Haiti. The squadron rendezvoused the next day and then the boats went in on the night of 20 April. They succeeded in bringing out nine merchant vessels that French privateers had taken as prizes. In the same series of operations the 74-gun ships Thunderer and Valiant destroyed the escorting French frigate, Harmonie.

Reported in November 1799 to be under command of Captain Bingham. While he commanded at Jamaica, Vice-Admiral Parker sent regular reports of warships and merchant vessels captured or destroyed by the ships under his command. At various times from October 1799 to February 1800, Quebec seized American, French or Danish merchant ships bound for ports in the Americas or Caribbean with cargoes as diverse as cocoa, lumber, wine, soap & sundries, flour, sugar, cotton, honey and hides. A Spanish vessel, Nostra Senora del Carmen "laden with fustie and brazil" was captured in March or April. Between May and August 1800, Quebec took captive an armed rowing boat with a crew of 19 men, a small schooner (name unknown) and six small merchant vessels cut out at different times.

When the Treaty of Amiens brought what would turn out to be a temporary peace in 1802, the Admiralty took Quebec out of commission. She did not return to active service until 1805.

== Napoleonic Wars ==
On 28 May 1806 Quebec and Paulina were in company and shared in the capture of Frau Geziner. (Note: A first-class share of the prize money was worth £4 11s 2¼d; a fifth-class share, that of a seaman, was worth 9d.)

In April 1807 the vessel Providentia fell to Quebec, and between 16 August and 2 September 1807, Quebec and her consorts took nineteen Danish merchant ships. (Note: The captured ships listed in the references were Ariansen, Canizler von Eybon, Conference Rath von Aspern, Emanuel, Enigkeit, Groenland, Hammonia, Haabet, Juliana, Kline Colmau, Margaretta, Maria, Master, Neptunus and Dolphin, Prinz Carl, Speculante, Stadt Altona, Susannah, and Victoria.) Quebec's station during this time was the Downs and the North Sea.

On 22 March 1808, while Danish harbours were still largely frozen in, Quebec was operating in the Great Belt and Kattegat as the Royal Navy gathered. The last operating Danish ship-of-the-line was under orders to clear the Great Belt of enemy (British) warships but was closely watched that morning by Quebec, with the sloop Lynx in company. In the early afternoon Falcon joined them in Sejerø Bay, as the Danish ship sailed north and east around Zealand Point. Two hours later the British ships-of-the-line Nassau and Stately were sighted and Quebec and the two sloops observed the ensuing battle without putting themselves in harm's way.

A few days later off Nyborg, a late winter storm dismasted Quebec. Falcon then helped her to erect a new mast and rigging.

In 1810, Quebec was stationed in the North Sea primarily off the Frisian Islands of Texel and Vlie to help enforce the naval blockade of that coast. In March she retook Susannah Margaretta, and boats from the hired armed cutters Idas and King George, under Quebec's command, captured a French privateer schutt of four guns, while subject to heavy small arms fire. On 21 March Quebec captured another French privateer, the lugger Imperatrice of 14 guns and 42 men off the Dogger Bank. On 23 May, when Desiree captured Financier, Quebec (under Charles Hawtayne) and Active were in company and shared the prize money.

Also on 23 May, Quebec captured James Cook. Six days later a cutting out expedition at Vlie with boats from Desireee, Quebec, Britomart and Bold) yielded a French lugger (12), a French privateer (4), a Dutch gunboat and a small rowboat. The British had no casualties; the French lost one man killed and three wounded. On the last day of May, Quebec took three more ships: St Jean Baptiste, Comtessa, and Forben. One more ship was taken on 17 September (Bienenstock) and two ships were recaptured during October 1810 (Jonge Edward and Perle).

On 8 November Quebec cut out a "fine French privateer schooner, La Jeune Louise (14)" from the Vlie Stroom, an area of difficult and shallow navigation. The year finished with the capture on 2 December of the French privateer cutter Renard, of six guns. Quebec shared the prize money with Kite.

In 1811 Quebec was still under the command of Captain Hawtayne and on the same station when she recaptured Aquator on 26 May.

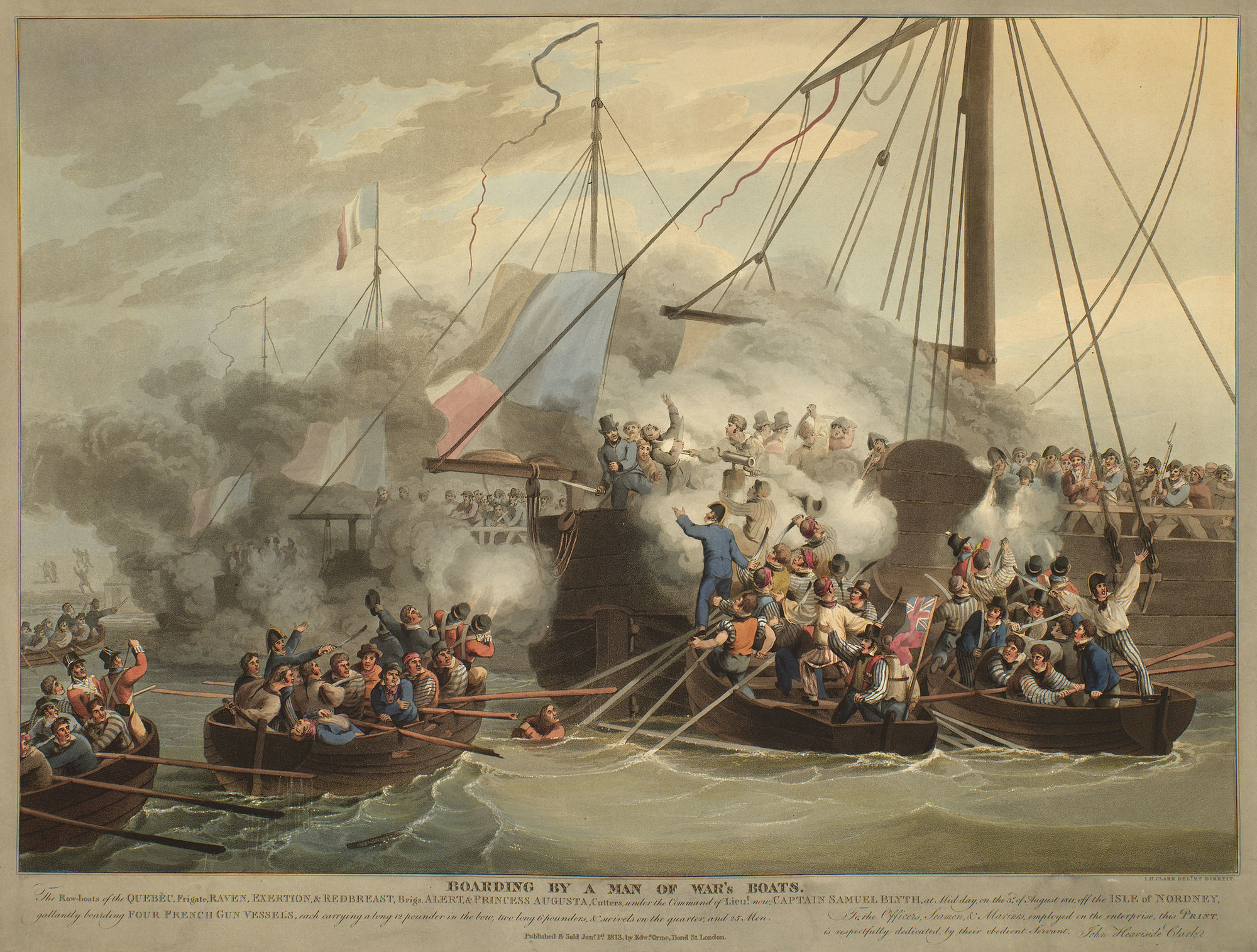
Boats from the Quebec boarding the French gun vessels at Norderney, 3 August 1811

In August 1811, in company with five lesser warships, (Note: The five were the brig Raven, the gun-brigs Exertion and Redbreast, and the hired cutters Alert and Princess.) Quebec captured a Vaisseau de Guerre of the Imperial Customs Service, later named as a privateer Christine Charlotte, with her crew of one officer and twelve men, as she was leaving Nordeney (East Frisian Islands) with a merchant vessel in tow. One of the men on Christine Charlotte was killed before she surrendered.) Boats from Quebec and her consorts then attacked and after a hard fight captured four enemy gunboats (Nos. 22, 28, 31, 71) in the harbour at Nordeney. British casualties were four men killed and 14 wounded; enemy casualties were two men killed and 12 wounded. (Note: The notice of the award of the clasp to the NGSM states that the boats captured three Danish gunboats. There were four. Furthermore, the names of the four commanders of the gunboats appear Dutch, and Hawatyne describes the armament as being of "Dutch metal", which "is much greater than the English", perhaps meaning that pounds were Dutch pounds, not English. The four gunboats were under the command of lieutenant de vaisseau Guillaume Wouters, of No.22. No. 22 had a crew of 25 men and was armed with one 12-pounder and two 6-pounder guns. No.28 was under the command of lieutenant de vaisseau Christian Smith. she had a crew of 24 men and was armed with one 12-pounder and two 8-pounder guns. No.31 was under the command of lieutenant de vaisseau Jan Dirk Schewe. She had a crew of 25 men and was armed with one 12-pounder and two 6-pounder guns. The fourth gunboat, No.71, was under the command of enseigne de vaisseau San Oieter Seiverda Munter. She had a crew of 25 men and was armed with one 12-pounder and two 6-pounder guns.) In 1847 the Admiralty awarded the NGSM to all surviving claimants from the action.

Two months later, on 30 October, Quebec was off the Flemish Banks when after a long chase she captured the privateer Olympia, of ten 18-pounder guns and 78 men. This was the former schooner HMS Olympia.

== Fate ==
At the end of the Napoleonic Wars, the Royal Navy laid up many of its ships, Quebec among them. She was advertised for sale in April 1816 for breaking up within twelve months: "Lying at Sheerness, Quebec of 32 guns and 700 tons". She was broken up in July.
