= HMS St Fermin =

Spanish ship and British Royal Navy sloop (1779–1785)

History

Spain
- Name: San Fermín
- Operator: Compañía Guipuzcoana de Caracas
- Launched: 1779
- Captured: On 8 January 1780, by the Royal Navy

Great Britain
- Name: HMS St Fermin
- Acquired: 16 January 1780
- Captured: On 4 April 1781, by the Spanish Navy

Spain
- Name: San Fermín
- Commissioned: 1781
- Out of service: 1785
- Fate: Decommissioned 1785

General characteristics
- Class & type: 16-gun ship-sloop
- Tons burthen: 250 (bm)
- Length: Overall: 90 ft 2 1/2 in (27.5 m); Keel: 72 ft 4 in (22.0 m)
- Beam: 25 ft 6 in (7.8 m)
- Draught: 12 ft 0 in (3.7 m)
- Propulsion: Sails
- Complement: 100 (British service)
- Armament: 16 × 6-pounder guns (British service)

San Fermín was launched in 1779 and became an armed merchant corvette for the Gipuzkoan Trading Company of Caracas. The British captured her at the action of 8 January 1780 and took her into the Royal Navy as HMS St. Fermin. The Spanish Navy recaptured her in 1781 and put her into service with the same name until she was decommissioned in 1785.

== History ==
St Fermin was a 16-gun armed merchantman that belonged to the Royal Guipuzcoan Company of Caracas. On 8 January 1780 she was under the command of Captain J. Vin. Eloy Sanchez and was sailing with a merchant convoy of the company. A British fleet under Admiral Sir George Brydges Rodney intercepted the convoy at Cape Finisterre and captured it on 8 June. Rodney sent to Britain the vessels of the convoy that were carrying commercial goods, with the captured 64-gun ship Guipuzcoano providing the escort. Rodney took with him for the relief of Gibraltar those vessels that carried naval supplies, together with the two smaller captured escorts, Saint Fermin and Saint Vincent. The British commissioned San Fermin in Gibraltar as the 16-gun sloop of war HMS St Fermin, under Commander Jonathan Faulknor.

Despite Rodney's delivery of supplies and reinforcements, Spain's siege of Gibraltar continued. At 1am on 7 June the Spanish launched an attack on Gibraltar by seven fireships. Boats from St Fermin helped tow some of these to where they could do no harm. By the firelight the British observed that some Spanish warships were waiting outside to intercept any British vessels that might try to escape. None did and the attack failed completely.

On 19 October St Fermin exchanged shots with some Spanish gunboats. St Fermin was not harmed.

On the evening of the 3 April 1781 St Fermin sailed from Gibraltar to Menorca with dispatches, together with the tender to Brilliant, and a settee. At the time, the British maintained contact with the British forces there, at least until 1782 when that island fell, by sending small, fast-sailing ships to run the blockade. On the way to Menorca, about 10 miles off Málaga, St Fermin was captured after a chase by two Spanish xebecs the next day. Her captors took her to Cartagena, Spain. She then served the Spanish Navy until decommissioned in 1785.
