= German West African Company =

Flag of the German West Africa Company (DWAG)

The German West African Company, in German Deutsch-Westafrikanische Gesellschaft / Compagnie, was a German chartered company, founded in 1885. It exploited the two German protectorates in German West Africa (Togo and Cameroon) but did not actually govern them — unlike its counterpart in German East Africa.

== History ==
The German West African Company was established as a chartered company with a headquarters in Hamburg. The company was active in both Kamerun and Togoland. Due to years of little profits, the company was absorbed by the German Empire on November 13, 1903.

== Kamerun ==
Now, modern-day Cameroon.

== Togo ==
Now, modern-day Togo and part of Ghana.

== See also ==
- German colonial empire
- German East Africa Company

== Sources and references ==
Horst Gründer, Geschichte der deutschen Kolonien, 4th ed. (Paderborn, Ferdinand Schöningh, 2000).

- CRWFlags.com contains its flag
- WorldStatesmen- here Cameroon & Togo
