= Federico Gravina =

Spanish Navy officer (1756–1806)

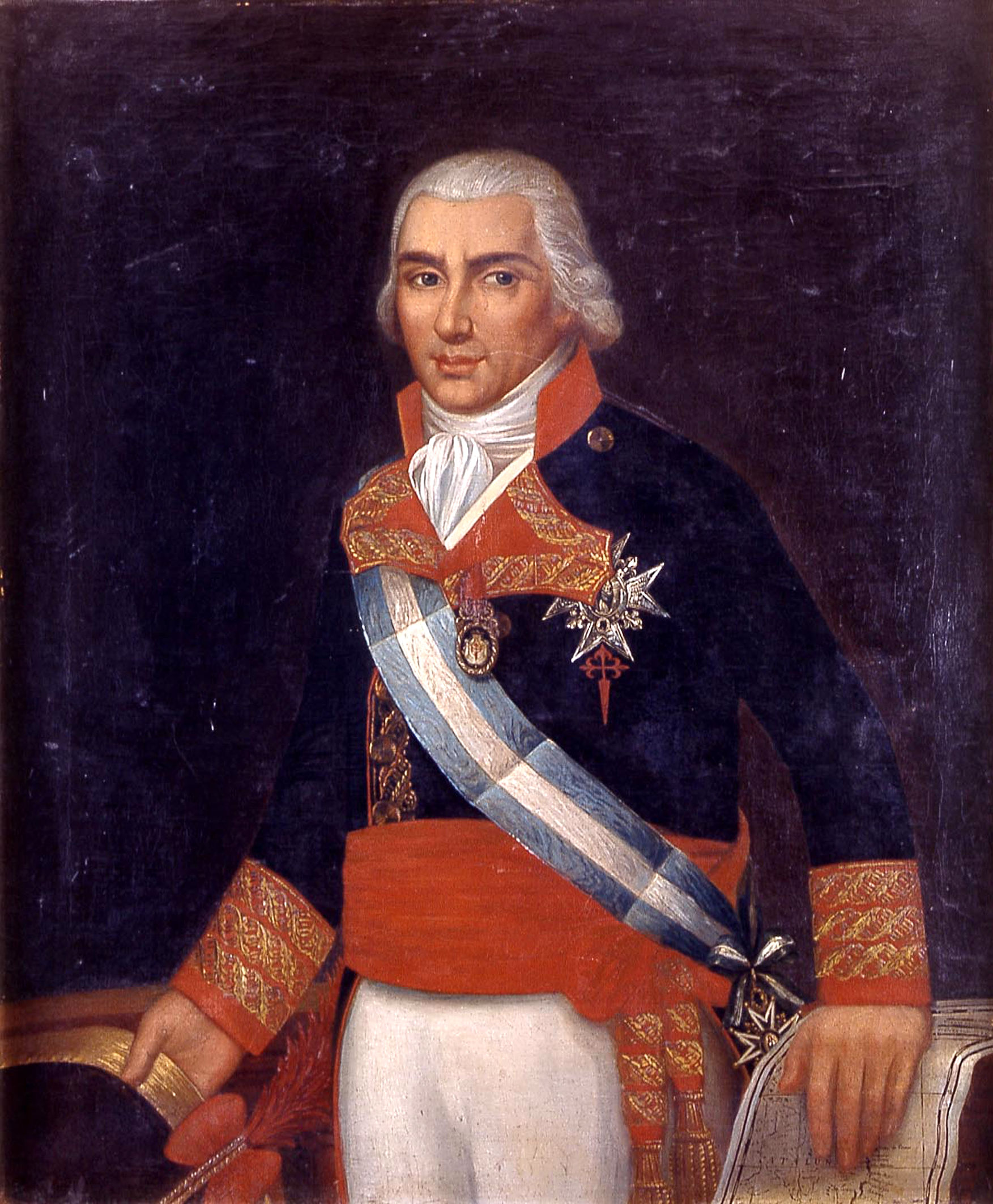
- Portrait of Gravina
- Born: Federico Carlo Gravina Cruyllas; 12 August 1756; Palermo, Kingdom of Sicily
- Died: 9 May 1806 (aged 49); Cádiz, Spain
- Military career
- Allegiance: Spain
- Branch: Spanish Navy
- Service years: 1768–1806
- Rank: Captain general of the Navy
- Conflicts: American Revolutionary War; Great Siege of Gibraltar; Capture of HMS St. Fermin; Invasion of Minorca (1781); French Revolutionary Wars; Siege of Toulon (1793); Napoleonic Wars; Battle of Trafalgar (DOW)

Captain general of the Navy Federico Carlos Gravina y Nápoli (born Federico Carlo Gravina y de Cruyllas; 12 August 1756 – 9 May 1806) was a Spanish Navy officer who served in the American Revolutionary War and the French Revolutionary and Napoleonic Wars. He died of wounds sustained during the Battle of Trafalgar. Explorer Jacinto Caamaño named the Gravina Island in Alaska in his honor.

== Origins and military career ==
Gravina was born in Palermo, capital city of the Kingdom of Sicily. His father was Don Giovanni Gravina Cruyllas Moncada, Prince of Montevago, Duke of San Miguel and Grandee of Spain, and his mother was Donna Eleonora Napoli Montaperto, daughter of the Prince of Resuttano, also a Grandee of Spain. He was the third of five brothers: the eldest son, Girolamo, inherited the titles; two others became prelates, Pietro, cardinal archbishop of Palermo, and Gabriele (born Berengario), bishop of Catania. The Gravina Cruyllas were a prominent Sicilian aristocratic family of Catalan origins settled in Catania and Palermo.

At that time the Salic law was in force, so the younger sons opted for either the ecclesiastical career, as in the case of the two brothers, or a military career, as was the case with Federico Carlo. With the help of his uncle, the Neapolitan and Sicilian Ambassador to Spain, he entered the Spanish Navy, as a naval cadet aged 12. He then served as midshipman on board the frigate Santa Clara in Brazil. In the course of this voyage, he carried out his first command when obtaining the surrender of the castle of the Ascensión, located in a small barren island near Santa Catalina. In 1777 he survived a boat accident in the River Plate in which most of the crew drowned. In 1778, on returning to Spain, he served as a lieutenant aboard a ship suppressing Algerian pirates. He then obtained his first command – the polacre-rigged xebec San Luis – in which he participated in the Siege of Gibraltar between 1779 and 1782, capturing the British sloop-of-war HMS St Fermin.

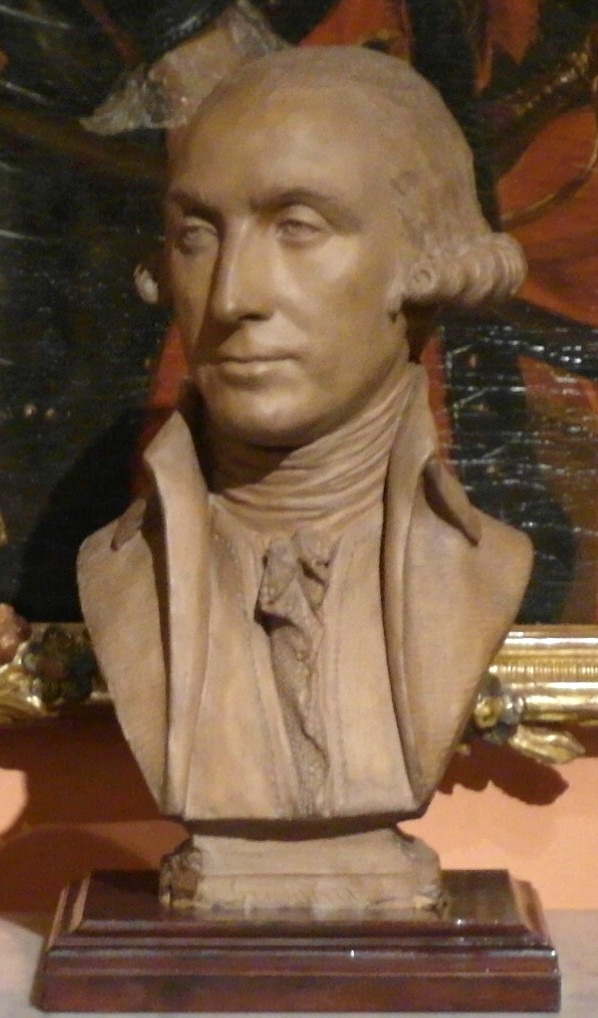
Bust of Gravina at the Naval Museum of Madrid

After promotion to commander he participated in the expedition against Menorca (then under British control), distinguishing himself in the attack on the fortress of San Felipe. After this, and for other actions, he was promoted to captain. In 1785 he commanded a squadron operating against Algerian corsairs, wiping them out and being awarded for his success. In 1788 he travelled to Constantinople returning the Ambassador Jussuf Efendi. While there he made and published various astronomical observations. After the death of King Charles III, Gravina took the news to the colonies, where his frigate Paz recorded one of the fastest-ever times for passages from Cadiz to the Spanish possessions in Central America.

In 1790 he was given command of a ship-of-the line, the Paula, in which he took part in the evacuation of Oran. The same year saw him demonstrate his administrative talents for the first time. During the Nootka Crisis, Gravina organised the formation of a Spanish fleet, the largest in 200 years. However, the crisis was eventually solved by diplomatic means.

In 1793 Gravina, now second-in-command of the Spanish fleet, served alongside Samuel Hood in the siege of Toulon. During this period he also visited Portsmouth to study British naval technology and tactics. On his return to Spain he was appointed to command a squadron of four ships, with which he served in the Mediterranean taking an active part in the war against Revolutionary France. His flagship was the Hermenegildo (112).

In 1796 Spain signed the treaty of San Ildefonso with France, making peace and later entering the war against Britain. Gravina served in a squadron under Jose de Mazarredo. In 1801 he was sent to San Domingo in the West Indies in command of the Spanish fleet during the Haiti expedition under the French General Charles Leclerc.

In 1804 he was appointed Ambassador to France in Paris. He accepted this position on one condition: if war should break out he would immediately return to the military.

While in Paris he attended Napoleon's coronation as Emperor, and established good relations with Denis Decres, the French naval minister. Gravina played a major part in the negotiations of the Franco-Spanish pact which put the Spanish Navy at Napoleon's disposal. For his services King Charles IV appointed him Commander-in-Chief of the Spanish Navy, and Gravina returned to Cadiz to hoist his flag on the ship Argonauta (80) in February 1805.

== Trafalgar ==
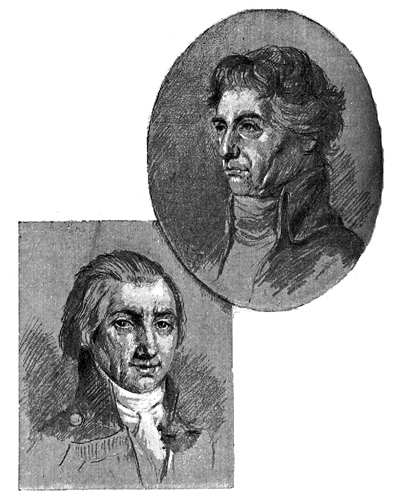
Gravina (left) and Horatio Nelson (right) in an illustration by Benito Pérez Galdós, 1882

When Napoleon proposed to invade Great Britain, following the orders of the government of Godoy, Gravina was placed under the command of French Admiral Pierre-Charles Villeneuve, who took the Franco-Spanish fleet into Caribbean waters to mislead the British navy. The objective was to allow the crossing of the English Channel by 180,000 men that Napoleon had waiting around Boulogne. The deception did not have desired effect. On its return the Franco-Spanish fleet was intercepted by a fleet under Sir Robert Calder at the Battle of Cape Finisterre, losing the Spanish ships Firme and San Rafael. After this they took refuge in Cádiz by order of Villeneuve, contradicting the original plan of Napoleon. The French soldiers never embarked, and were moved to the interior of Europe, freeing many of them to take part in the Battle of Austerlitz. He later moved his flag to Príncipe de Asturias.

In Cadiz relations between the supposed allies were poor. Gravina and other Spanish commanders argued strongly with the French, who wanted to sail immediately, whereas the Spaniards recommended waiting for more favourable conditions. Gravina was also concerned about the yellow fever epidemic that had left his ships short of men, as well as the lingering resentment against the French, for their perceived lack of support at the Battle of Cape Finisterre. The fleet finally left Cadiz on 20 October 1805, leading to the Battle of Trafalgar the next day.

During the battle Gravina, on his flagship Príncipe de Asturias, found himself attacked by three British ships at once. The main mast and mizzen were shot through, rigging and sails shot to pieces. At about half past three in the afternoon Gravina's left arm was shattered by grapeshot, and seeing a looming defeat, he managed to gather ten ships around his flagship and fell back to Cadiz under tow. Despite this Gravina was promoted to the highest military rank of captain general of the Navy, but he never fully recovered from his wounds and finally succumbed to them on 9 May 1806, aged 49. On his deathbed he said, "I am a dying man, but I die happy; I am going, I hope and trust, to join Nelson, the greatest hero that the world perhaps has produced."

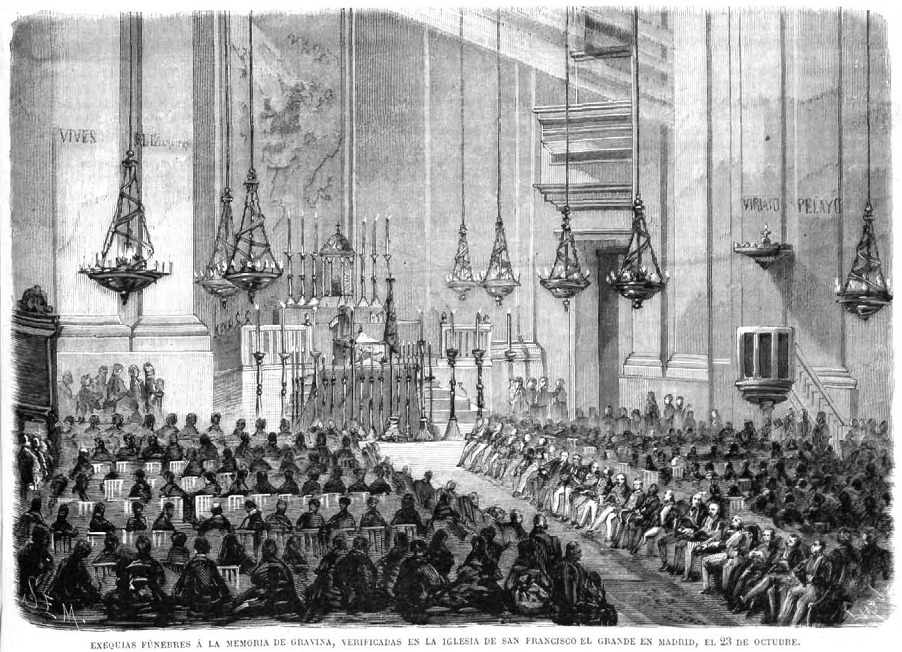
Memorial service in remembrance of Gravina at the Basilica of San Francisco el Grande, 1870

In turn the Gibraltar Chronicle paid the following tribute, "Spain loses in Gravina the most distinguished officer in her navy; one under whose command her fleets, though sometimes beaten, always fought in such a manner as to merit the encomiums of their conquerors." As Napoleon wrote in a letter of 11 August 1805: "Gravina is all genius and decision in combat. If Villeneuve had had those qualities, the battle of Finisterre would have been a complete victory". Gravina is buried at the Panteón de Marinos Ilustres in San Fernando, Cadiz.

== Ancestry ==
Ancestors of Federico Gravina

16. Girolamo Michele Gravina Cruyllas, 2rd Duke of San Michele
8. Giovanni Gravina Cruyllas, 3rd Duke of San Michele
17. Caterina Requesens
4. Girolamo Gravina Cruyllas, 4th Prince of Montevago
18. Rutilio Scirotta, 1st Prince of Montevago
9. Girolama Scirotta, 3rd Princess of Montevago
19. Eleonora Gravina
2. Giovanni Gravina Cruyllas, 5th Prince of Montevago
20. Ferdinando Moncada, 6th Duke of San Giovanni
10. Luigi Guglielmo Moncada, 7th Prince of Paternò
21. Giovanna Gaetana Branciforte, 5th Duchess of San Giovanni
5. Caterina Moncada
22. Francesco IV Rodrigo Ventimiglia, 5th Prince of Castelbuono
11. Giovanna Ventimiglia
23. Giovanna Pignatelli Tagliavia d'Aragona Cortés
1. Federico Carlo Gravina Cruyllas
24. Pietro di Napoli, 1st Duke of Bissana
12. Federico di Napoli, 5th Prince of Resuttano
25. Giuseppa La Grua Talamanca
6. Pietro di Napoli, 6th Prince of Resuttano
26. Pietro Giardina Bellacera, 2nd Prince of Monteleone
13. Eleonora Giardina Bellacera
27. Stefania del Bosco
3. Eleonora di Napoli
28. Francesco Montaperto Uberti, 2nd Prince of Raffadali
14. Ottavio Montaperto Uberti, 3rd Prince of Raffadali
29. Elisabetta Lanza
7. Elisabetta Montaperto Uberti
30. Giovanni Andrea Massa, 1st Duke of Castel d'Aci
15. Rosalia Massa
31. Giulia Massa

== Commemoration ==
The cruiser Gravina, which was in commission in the Spanish Navy in the early 1880s, was named for Gravina.

== See also ==
- Battle of Trafalgar
