= Portuguese Asia Commerce Company =

The Portuguese Asia Commerce Company (Portuguese: Companhia do Comércio da Asia Portuguesa) was a charter company created by Sebastião José de Carvalho e Melo, Marquis of Pombal, in 1753. It was made to promote mercantile activity between the Qing Dynasty and Portuguese India.

== History ==
The company was established after Feliciano Velho Oldemberg and five other merchants received permission to negotiate relations between India and China for a period of a decade. However, the Lisbon Earthquake of 1755 caused great damage to both the company's newly acquired ships and goods stocked in Lisbon. Subsequent scandals involving Feliciano's son and the Marquis and a failure to repay loans to the Portuguese monarchy led to the bankruptcy of both the company and Feliciano, its main shareholder in 1760.
