= Capture of HMS St. Fermin =

Naval action of the Anglo-Spanish War (1779–1783)

- Part of American Revolutionary War
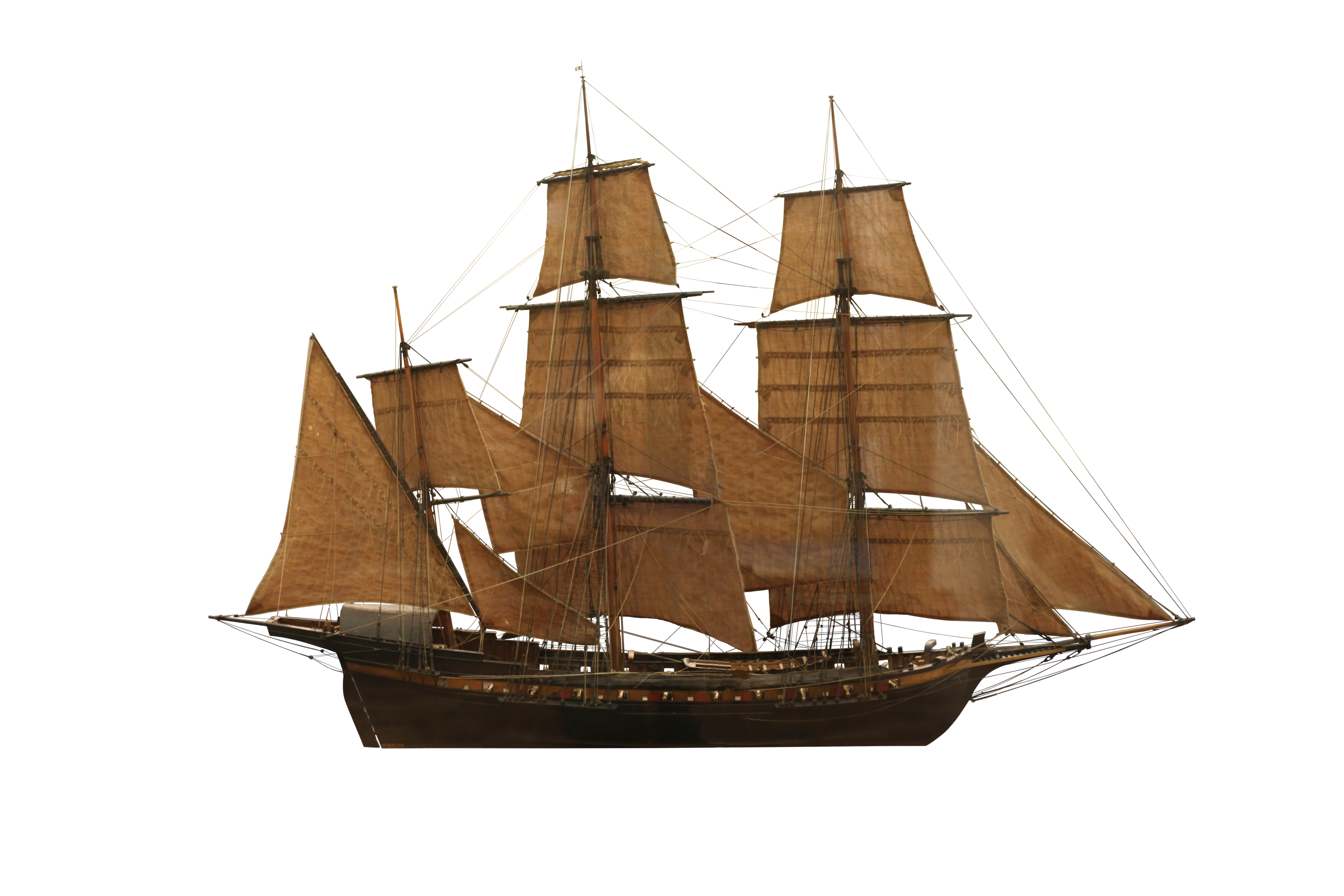
- Squared-rigged xebec of the 1780-1815 period
Date	4 April 1781
Location	Off Málaga, Mediterranean Sea 36.5058940°N 4.2105100°W
Result	Spanish victory

Belligerents
Spain	(Kingdom of Great Britain) Great Britain

Commanders and leaders
(Spain) J. Herrera-Dávila	(Kingdom of Great Britain) Jonathan Faulknor (surrendered)

Strength
2 xebecs	1 sloop-of-war

Casualties and losses
None	138 prisoners 1 sloop-of-war captured

The Capture of HMS St. Fermin was a naval engagement that took place off Málaga on 4 April 1781, during the American Revolutionary War. Spanish xebecs San Antonio and San Luis captured the sloop-of-war HMS St. Fermin.

== Events ==
=== Background ===
At the end of December 1779, a large fleet sailed from Great Britain under the command of Admiral Sir George Brydges Rodney, being one of the purposes of this British fleet to resupply Gibraltar, a place that was under siege by Spanish and French forces. During the trip, Rodney intercepted a Spanish convoy of the Royal Guipuzcoan Company of Caracas at Cape Finisterre on 8 January 1780, capturing the entire convoy.

Among the ships captured by Rodney's fleet was the 16-gun armed merchantman San Fermín, which he took to Gibraltar. The British subsequently commissioned San Fermín into the Royal Navy as the 16-gun sloop-of-war St. Fermin, under the command of Commander Jonathan Faulknor. St. Fermin, under Faulknor's command, participated in a number of military actions during the siege of Gibraltar.

=== Capture ===
On the evening of 3 April 1781, St. Fermin departed from Gibraltar to Menorca bearing dispatches. At that time, the British maintained contact with the British garrison there, at least until 1782 when the Spaniards conquered the island, sending fast sailships to avoid the Spanish blockade.

St. Fermin managed to pass the waters of the Strait of Gibraltar without problems, but the Spaniards had several naval stations in the area from where they could detect and intercept British ships. From the naval station of Punta del Carnero, an enclave south of Algeciras, two square-rigged xebecs of the Spanish Navy sailed to chase the British ship. The xebecs were the 26-gun San Antonio under Captain José Herrera-Dávila and the 24-gun San Luis under Lieutenant Federico Gravina, manned by more than two hundred men. That night, Faulknor saw the two Spanish ships approaching and did everything possible to escape. At eleven o'clock at night the Spaniards lost sight of him, but half an hour later they spotted him again. At four o'clock in the morning, the Spaniards were within striking distance of St. Fermin, beginning the attack with their chase guns, responding to the British ship with their stern guns. (Note: Hepper indicates that both Spanish ships were within walking distance of St. Fermin and attacked him with his chase guns. For his part, Vela says that only San Antonio reached him first, for being faster, so he was the only Spanish xebec who fired with his guns during the action.) Herrera-Davila's ship approached the British ship's port flap and fired several shots, which was enough for Faulknor to surrender. The two Spanish ships could have made a boarding attack if the fight had continued. The night action took place about 10 miles (16 km) off Málaga.

=== Aftermath ===
The British ship had a crew of 138 men, (Note: St. Fermin had on board a complement of 100 men plus 38 soldiers of the garrison of Gibraltar to support the British forces stationed in Menorca.) which were taken prisoner by Spanish forces led by Teniente Miguel Pedrueca. The Spanish took the captured ship to Cartagena. She was then assigned to the Spanish Navy as the 16-gun San Fermín, until she was laid up in 1785.

== Bibliography ==
- Hepper, David J. (1994). British Warship Losses in the Age of Sail, 1650–1859. Jean Boudriot. ISBN 0-948864-30-3.
- Vela, Rubén (2017). Presas de la Armada española, 1779–1828: Listado de buques de guerra apresados e incorporados a la Real Armada por apresamiento (in Spanish). ISBN 978-1-86176-030-2.
