= HMS Prince William (1780) =

Ship of the line of the Royal Navy

- Prince William

History

Spain
- Name: Guipuzcoana
- Builder: Guipuzcoana Company's shipyards
- Launched: October 1778
- Fate: Captured by United Kingdom on 8 January 1780

United Kingdom
- Name: HMS Prince William
- Fate: Broken up in September 1817

General characteristics
- Class & type: 64-gun third-rate ship of the line
- Tons burthen: 1,346 61/94 tons bm
- Length: 153 ft 2.25 in (46.69 m) (overall); 130 ft 8 in (39.83 m) (keel)
- Beam: 44 ft 1 in (13.44 m)
- Depth of hold: 19 ft 9.25 in (6.0262 m)
- Sail plan: Full-rigged ship
- Complement: 500
- Armament: Lower deck: 26 × 24-pdrs; Upper deck: 28 × 12-pdrs; Quarterdeck/Forecastle: 10 × 9-pdrs

HMS Prince William was a 64-gun third-rate ship of the line of the Royal Navy. She had previously been Guipuzcoano, an armed 64-gun ship of the Spanish (Basque) mercantile Guipuzcoan Company of Caracas. She was also known by the religious name of Nuestra Señora de la Asunción.

Guipuzcoano was sailing as the flagship of an escort for a merchant convoy of the company, when they ran into a large British fleet under Admiral Sir George Rodney, bound for the relief of Gibraltar. In a short action Rodney captured the entirety of the convoy and all its escorts, including the Guipuscoano, which he manned and named in honour of Prince William, sending her back to Britain with some of the merchants.

The Navy approved her acquisition and after fitting out she was sent to the West Indies, where she took part in most of the battles there during the American War of Independence, including the capture of Sint Eustatius and the battles of Fort Royal, Saint Kitts and the Saintes. She returned to Britain after the end of the wars, was converted to a sheer hulk before the start of the French Revolutionary Wars, was a receiving ship by 1811 and was broken up in 1817, two years after the end of the Napoleonic Wars.

== Capture ==
Guipuzcoano was sailing as the flagship of Commodore Don Juan Agustín de Yardi, and commanded by Captain Don Tomás de Malay, in late 1779, escorting a convoy of 15 merchants of the Guipuzcoan Company of Caracas from San Sebastián to Cádiz. Also escorting the convoy were four company frigates, the 32-gun San Carlos, 30-gun San Rafael, 28-gun Santa Teresa and 26-gun San Bruno, and two smaller vessels, the 16-gun San Fermín and 10-gun San Vicente. On 8 January 1780 the convoy encountered a large British fleet off Cape Finisterre under Admiral Sir George Rodney, bound for the relief of Gibraltar. Rodney closed on the convoy, the copper sheathing on some of his ships allowing them to outsail the Spanish. The whole convoy was captured, with vessels which had been carrying naval stores to the Spanish fleet at Cádiz, and baled goods for the Royal Caracas Company being sent back to England, escorted by HMS America and HMS Pearl. Those Spanish ships that were found to be carrying provisions were taken to Gibraltar by Rodney, and used to relieve the British forces there.^{[a]}

In addition Rodney commissioned and manned the captured Spanish flagship, the 64-gun Guipuzcoano, naming her HMS Prince William, in honour of Prince William, who had been present at the engagement. Rodney promoted his First Lieutenant Erasmus Gower to post captain to command Prince William and sail her to Gibraltar where her foremast was removed and replaced before she was sailed to England under another captain. The four captured frigates were not added to the navy, but the two smaller vessels were purchased, being named HMS Saint Fermin and HMS Saint Vincent and rated as 14-gun brigs.^{[b]}

== British career ==
The name Prince William was confirmed on 3 April 1780 and she was fitted and coppered at Portsmouth between April and August 1780. She was commissioned under her first commander, Captain Stair Douglas, in April that year, and joined the Channel Fleet under Sir George Darby. She sailed for the West Indies in November 1780 with the fleet under Sir Samuel Hood, and saw action with the fleet at the capture of Sint Eustatius in February 1781, and at the Battle of Fort Royal on 29/30 April 1781. Prince William then left the West Indies at the end of the year, sailing to North America and arriving there in October. She was soon back in the West Indies with Hood, and command passed from Douglas to Captain George Wilkinson. She fought with Hood's fleet at the Battle of Saint Kitts on 25/26 January 1782, where she had three men wounded.

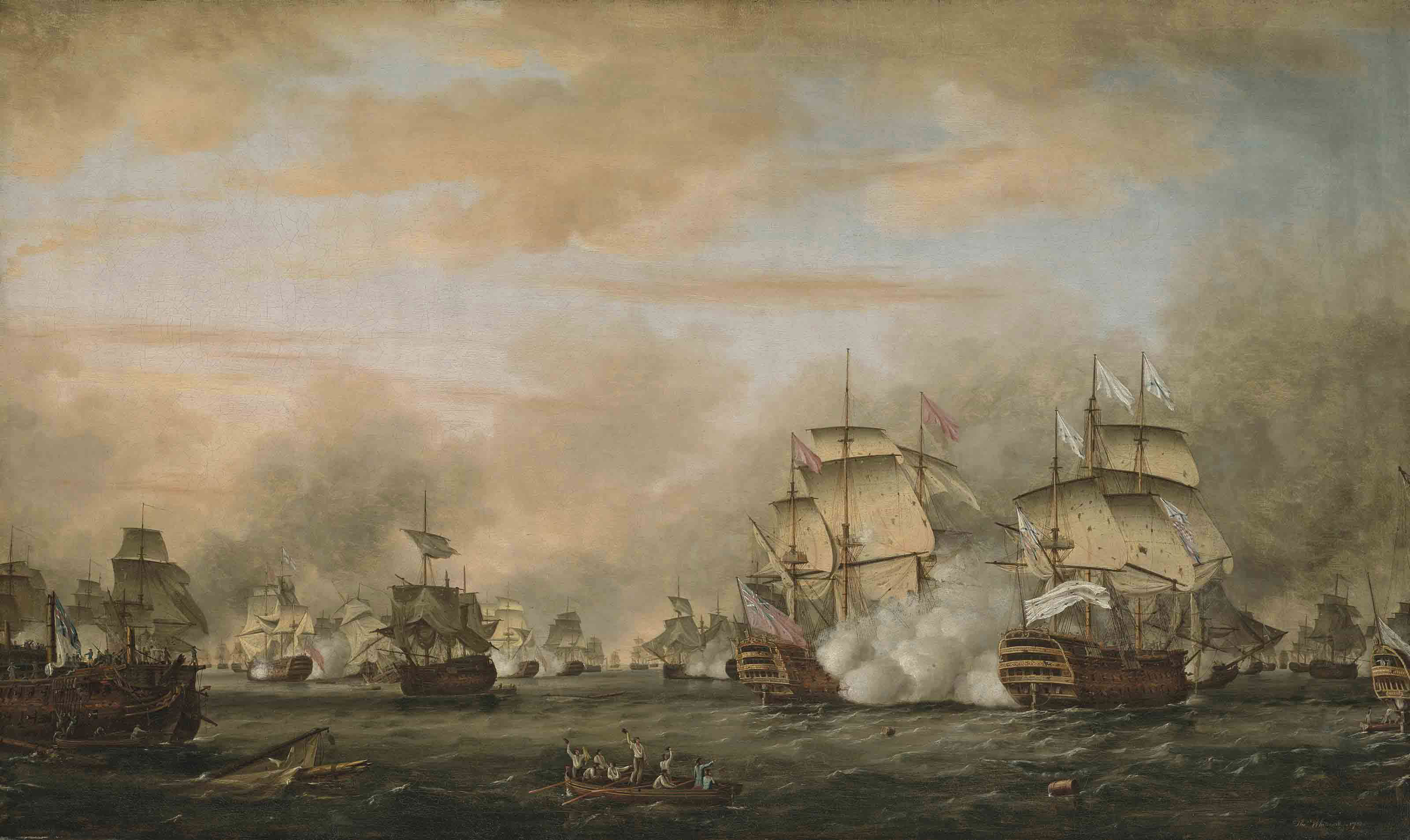
The Battle of the Saintes, 12 April 1782: surrender of the Ville de Paris by Thomas Whitcombe, painted 1783

Prince William fought at the brief clash with the Comte de Grasse in the Dominica Channel on 9 April 1782, and was then at the decisive British victory at the Battle of the Saintes on 12 April 1782, where she was the last ship in the van division and escaped suffering any casualties. Prince William was then part of the squadron despatched under Hood to chase down French ships, but due to her poor sailing did not arrive in time to take part in the Battle of the Mona Passage. On 14 April Wilkinson was succeeded by Captain James Vashon, who spent only two months in command before being appointed Rodney's flag captain aboard HMS Formidable. Captain William Merrick took command later in 1782, and in July she sailed to North America with the fleet under Admiral Hugh Pigot. The fleet was at New York City between September and October, after which it sailed to blockade Cap François. Prince William sailed from Jamaica in April 1783, bound for Britain to be paid off on her arrival in July. After some time spent laid up, she was fitted as a sheer hulk at Portsmouth between December 1790 and April 1791, and in this state saw out most of the French Revolutionary and Napoleonic Wars. She had been fitted out as a receiving ship for guns by 1811, and was broken up at Portsmouth in September 1817, two years after the end of the Napoleonic Wars.

== Notes ==
a. Rodney successfully relieved Gibraltar, and then engaged and defeated a Spanish fleet under Juan de Lángara at the Battle of Cape St Vincent, on 16 January 1780.

b. The two had short careers with the Royal Navy. HMS Saint Fermin was captured by two Spanish xebecs on 4 April 1781 while under the command of Jonathan Faulknor, while HMS Saint Vincent was sold in April 1783.
