= Barcelona Trading Company =

Spanish chartered company

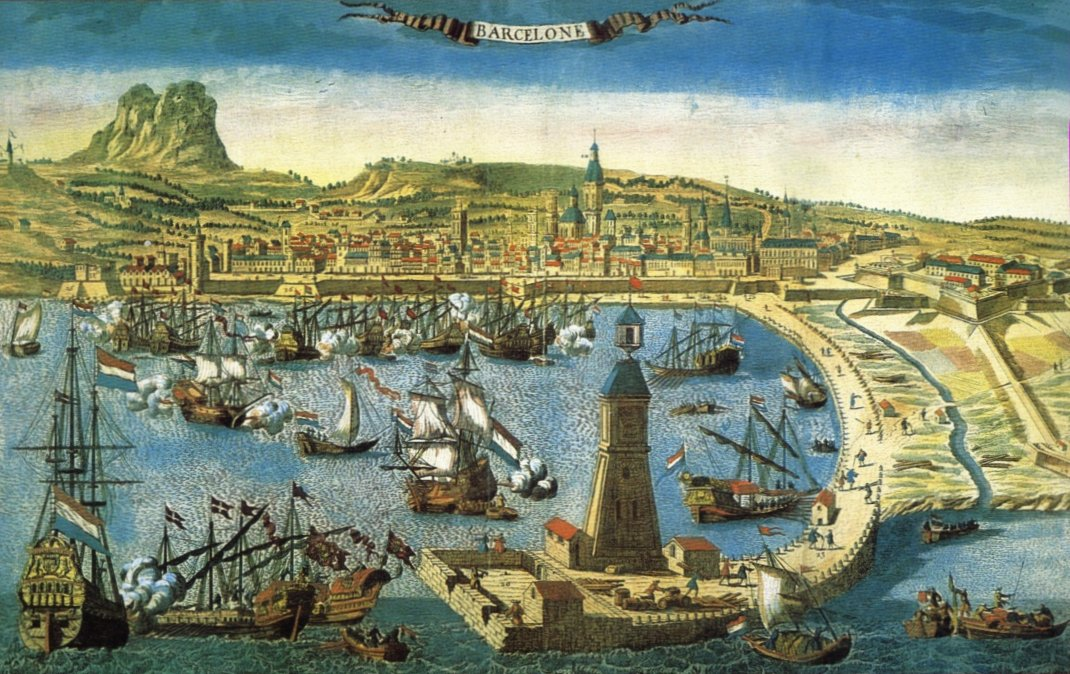
- Type: Public company
- Industry: Trade
- Founded: 1755
- Defunct: 1785
- Fate: Dissolved
- Successor: Royal Company of the Philippines
- Headquarters: Barcelona, Spain
- Area served: Catalonia, Caribbean
- Products: cotton, cocoa, indigo, brandy, wine, chintz
- Total equity: 1 million pesos

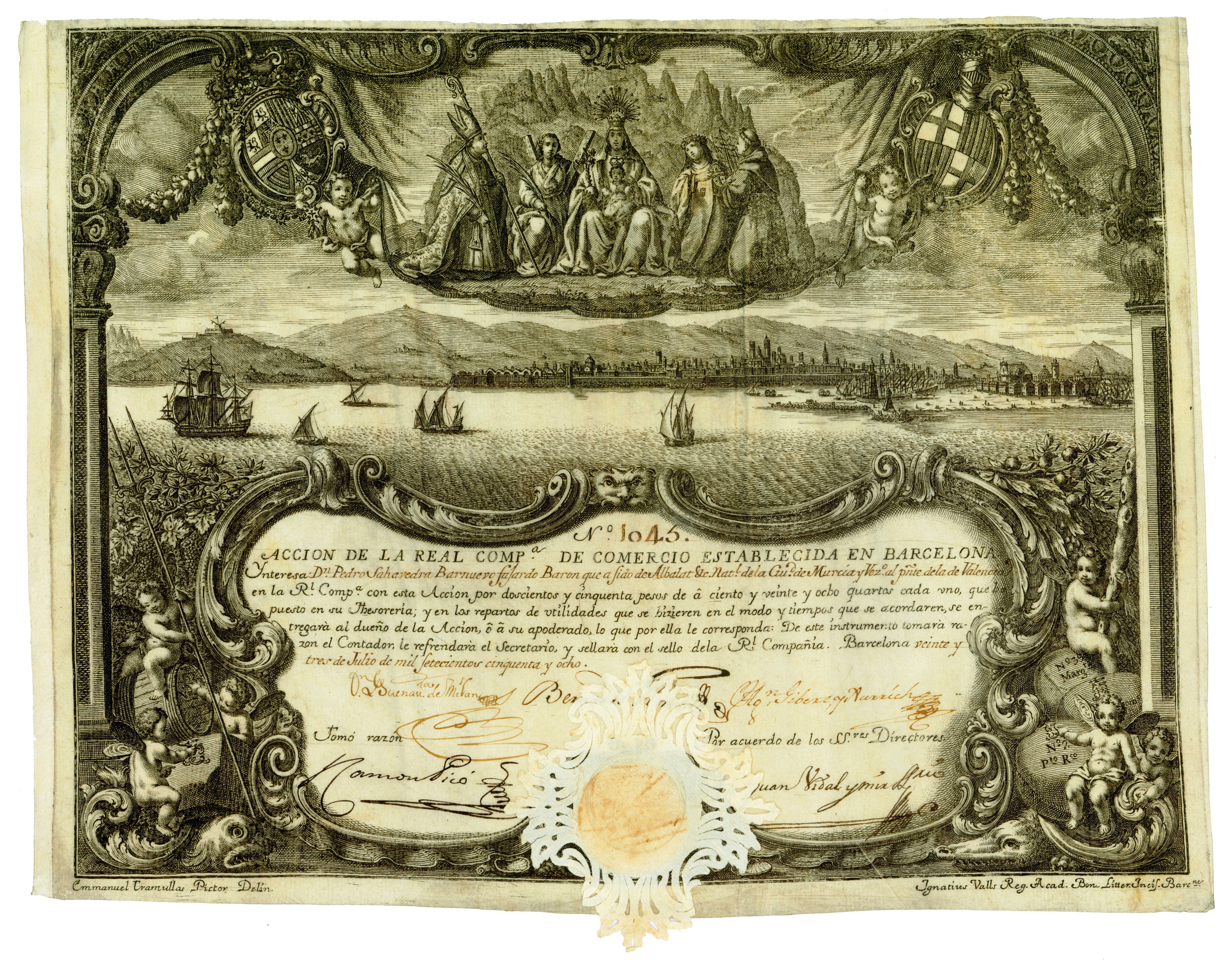
A share certificate of the Compañía de Comercio de Barcelona, issued 23. July 1758

The Barcelona Trading Company (Spanish: Real Compañía de Comercio de Barcelona a Indias; Catalan: Companyia de Comerç de Barcelona) was a Spanish chartered company founded in 1755 by the Spanish crown which had a monopoly on trade to the Spanish West Indies territories of Puerto Rico, Hispaniola and Margarita Island.

The company provided a legal framework and a focus for capital which enabled Catalan merchants to break free from the restrictions of the Cadiz monopoly on trade with the Indies, provided skills and contacts that enabled the development of free trade between Catalonia and the Americas to flourish after the company's demise, and contributed to the development of the textile industry which later became the basis of industrialisation in Catalonia.

The integration of Catalonia'a economy in international trade is the root of the exceptional experience of Catalan industrialisation and the development of an increasingly capitalist economy. The company was merged with the Guipuzcoan Company of Caracas in 1785 to form the Royal Company of the Philippines.

== Historical context ==
Since 1503, under the Habsburg kings, all trade with America had been conducted through the port of Seville (and after 1717, Cádiz) under a monopoly that prevented other cities, including Barcelona, from trade with the Americas, or the Indies as they were known. Tentatively by the late 17th century Catalan goods had reached the Indies via the Spanish coastal trade to Cádiz and this grew slowly until by the mid 1740s entire ships were beginning to be fitted out in Barcelona for transatlantic commerce.

The Barcelona Company was one of a number of chartered companies established by the Spanish government in the 18th century as part of the Bourbon Reforms, with the intention of reforming Spain's commerce with the Americas, integrating colonial economies at the peripheries of the Spanish Empire and reducing the activities of British, French and Dutch privateers and smugglers.

These new companies enjoyed commercial privileges (so sometimes called 'Privileged Companies' in Spanish) and included the Royal Guipuzcoan Company of Caracas, the Honduras Company, the Seville Company and the Havana Company. They strongly resembled the English, Dutch and French trading companies of the 17th century. Trading companies were not the only concerns with royal privileges chartered at this time; a number of royal factories were also established.

== Activity ==
The Barcelona Trading Company was granted a monopoly on trade to the Caribbean islands of Puerto Rico, Santo Domingo and Margarita as well as being allowed ten annual visits to Guatemala and Honduras, trade with Cumaná (north eastern Venezuela) and some limited trading with Havana.

The company exported principally wine and brandy and increasingly chintz (or printed calico Catalan: indianes) as this industry grew in Barcelona. Imported products included raw cotton, indigo, brazilwood, cocoa, tobacco, sugar amongst others.

The raw cotton and dyes assisted in the production of chintz (or printed calico Spanish: indianas) that was then reexported to the Americas as well as the domestic (Spanish peninsula) market. As Ringrose says,

Unlike virtually all of the other commercial connections being developed, this one promised the sort of economic interdependence between peninsular industry and colonial markets and raw materials that was the ideal of mercantilist economic reformers.

== Dissolution ==
In 1778, King Charles III signed the 'Decree of Free Trade' between Spain and the Americas effectively removing the company's monopoly. The company was further weakened by losing half its ships through the Spanish involvement in the American Revolutionary War. The company was dissolved between 1784 and 1785 and merged with the Caracas Company to form the Royal Philippine Company.

== Legacy ==
The company provided a legal framework and a vehicle for the concentration of capital necessary to break free of the Cadiz monopoly (which had proven difficult to surmount through the action of individual merchants) and created the conditions that would later allow free trade with the colonies to flourish.

These conditions included the focus of a large part of the economic activity of the principality of Catalonia upon trade with the Americas, the integration of the economy with that of the colonies and the building a base of knowledge, skill and commercial contacts amongst merchants who came to consider an Atlantic voyage as an everyday occurrence.

The trade with the Americas also encouraged and fed the already growing industry of calico print production and, much later, spinning and weaving of cotton cloth (the Royal Spinning Company was established in Barcelona in 1772 to spin American raw cotton. The textile industry became the basis of industrialisation in Catalonia in the 19th century, although to what extent colonial trade contributed to the industry's growth, there is some debate.

In contrast to the greater part of the American empire which achieved independence from Spain in the first decades of the 19th century, Cuba, Santo Domingo and Puerto Rico were amongst those few possessions that remained within the empire. Consequently, the trading relationships with Catalonia continued to build upon those established by the Barcelona Company (Antilles trade with all Spanish ports rising 300% between 1850 and 1890) until these territories were finally lost in the Spanish–American War of 1898.

== See also ==
- Casa de Contratación

== Bibliography ==
- Ringrose, David (1998). Spain, Europe and the Spanish Miracle, 1700–1900. Cambridge University Press. ISBN 0521646308.
- Hunt, Nadine (2013). "Contraband, free ports, and British merchants in the Caribbean world, 1739–1772". Studi di Storia Contemporanea (13). Diacronie. doi:10.4000/diacronie.672. ISSN 2038-0925.
- Céspedes del Castillo, Guillermo (1983). América Hispánica (1492–1898) [Spanish America (1492–1898)]. Historia de España [History of Spain]. Barcelona: Labor. ISBN 9788433594266. OCLC 10951135.
- Martínez Galarraga, Julio; Prat, Marc (2016). "Wages, prices, and technology in early Catalan industrialisation". Economic History Review. 69 (2): 548–574. doi:10.1111/ehr.12127. hdl:2445/102823. JSTOR 43910580. OCLC 51439630.
- Oliva Melgar, José Maria (1987). Cataluña y el comercio privilegiado con América en el siglo XVIII: la Real Compañía de Comercio de Barcelona a Indias [Catalonia and the Privileged Trade with America in the 18th century: the Royal Barcelona Trading Company to the Indies] (in Spanish). University of Barcelona. ISBN 84-7528-485-X. OCLC 18748042.
- Martínez Shaw, Carlos (1974). "Los orígenes de la industria algodonera catalana y el comercio colonial" [The origins of the Catalan cotton industry and trade]. In Nadal, Jordi; Tortella, Gabriel (eds.). Agricultura, comercio colonial y crecimiento económico en la España contemporanea [Agriculture, colonial trade and economic growth in contemporary Spain] (in Spanish). Barcelona. pp. 243–267. ISBN 8434465043.
- Fontana, Josep (1974). "Comercio colonial e industrialización" [Colonial trade and industrialisation]. In Nadal, Jordi; Tortella, Gabriel (eds.). Agricultura, comercio colonial y crecimiento económico en la España contemporanea (in Spanish). Barcelona. pp. 358–365. ISBN 8434465043.
- Nadal i Oller, Jordi (2003). Atlas de la industrialización de España, 1750–2000 [Atlas of Spanish industrialisation, 1750–2000] (in Spanish). Grupo Planeta (GBS). p. 51. ISBN 848432382X.
- Thomson, J.K.J (1992). A Distinctive Industrialization: Cotton in Barcelona 1728–1832. Cambridge University Press. ISBN 0521394821. OCLC 24173655.
