= House of Gravina =

Noble family of Norman origins

- Place of origin: Gravina in Puglia, Italy
- Founder: Silvano di Gravina
- Motto: Spero (I hope)

The House of Gravina, then Gravina Cruyllas, was a noble family of Norman origins, with roots stretching back to Rollo, the first ruler of Normandy.

== History ==
The house was founded by Silvano, owner of the land of Gravina in modern-day Apulia, from which he and his descendants took the name. King Martin I of Sicily, on 20 November 1405, formally recognised the family's noble Norman origins by issuing a diploma (a form of charter) upon Giacomo of Gravina. Following the charter, Giacomo chose to relocate the family to Sicily, where the King allowed him and his descendants to be buried in the Royal Chapel of Catania, now known as Basilica della Collegiata.

The family acquired the surname Cruyllas, and kept it for three centuries, when Girolamo Gravina, 4th baron of Palagonia, in 1531 married Contessina Moncada Cruyllas, the last heir of a family of Catalan origin, who brought him a very rich dowry including the fief of Calatabiano and that of Francofonte.

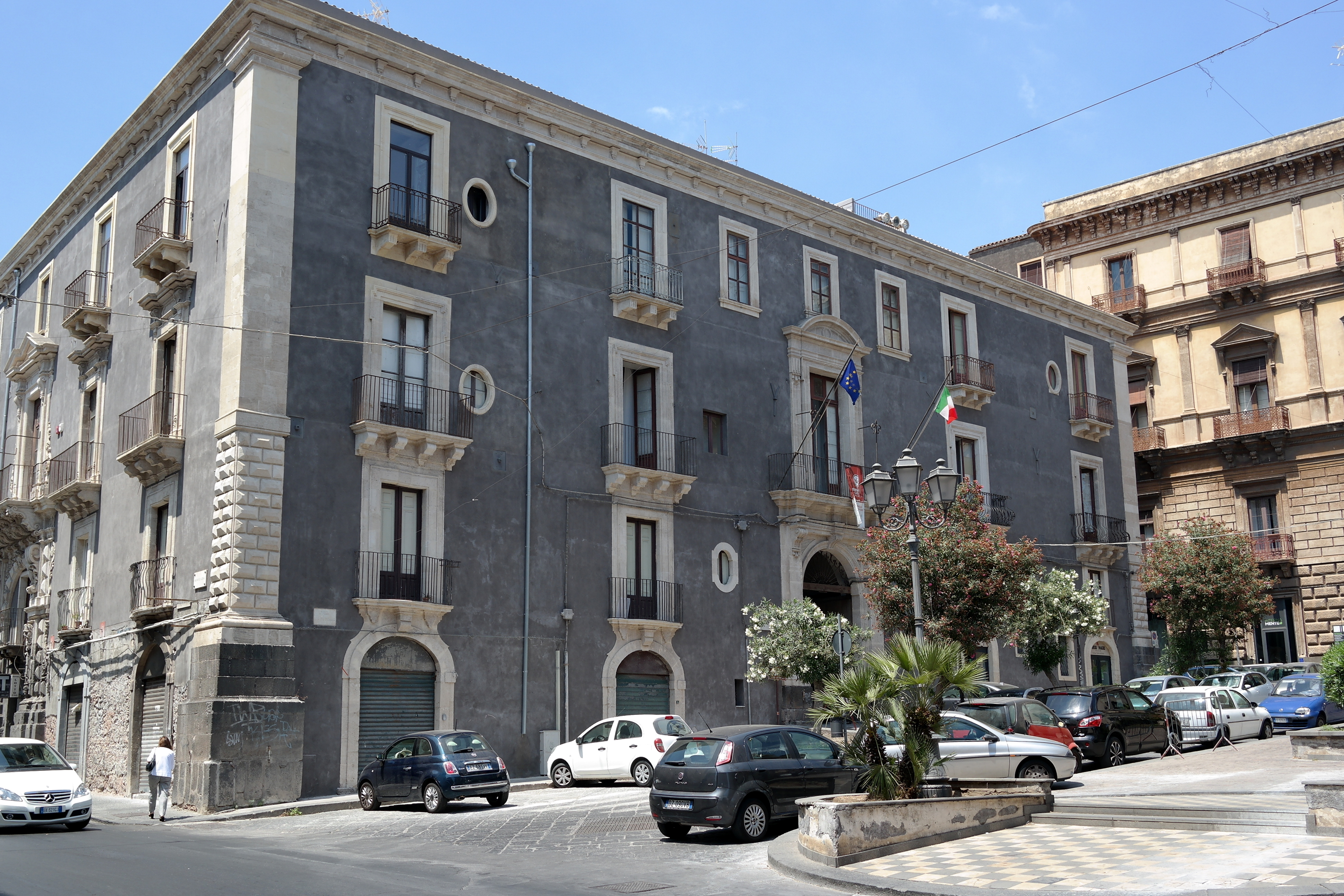
Gravina Cruyllas Palace in Catania

The family divided into many branches, of which the main and princely were: Palagonia, Ramacca, Comitini and Montevago. Their exponents always occupied important positions in the history of the island, but also of all Europe, as the case of Federico Carlo Gravina Cruyllas.

== Heraldry ==
The house's coat of arms is emblazoned as "Azure, two bends Or, a mullet of ten points in sinister chief Argent". Its motto was "Spero", which translates to "I hope" from Italian.
