= German East Africa Company =

Chartered colonial organization leading to the establishment of German East Africa

German East Africa Company Deutsch-Ostafrikanische Gesellschaft
- Company coat of arms

- Company flag
- Type: Public
- Industry: International trade
- Founded: 28 March 1884 (as the Society for German Colonisation)
- Defunct: 1920
- Fate: Defunct following dissolution of German colonial empire after World War I
- Headquarters: Berlin, Germany

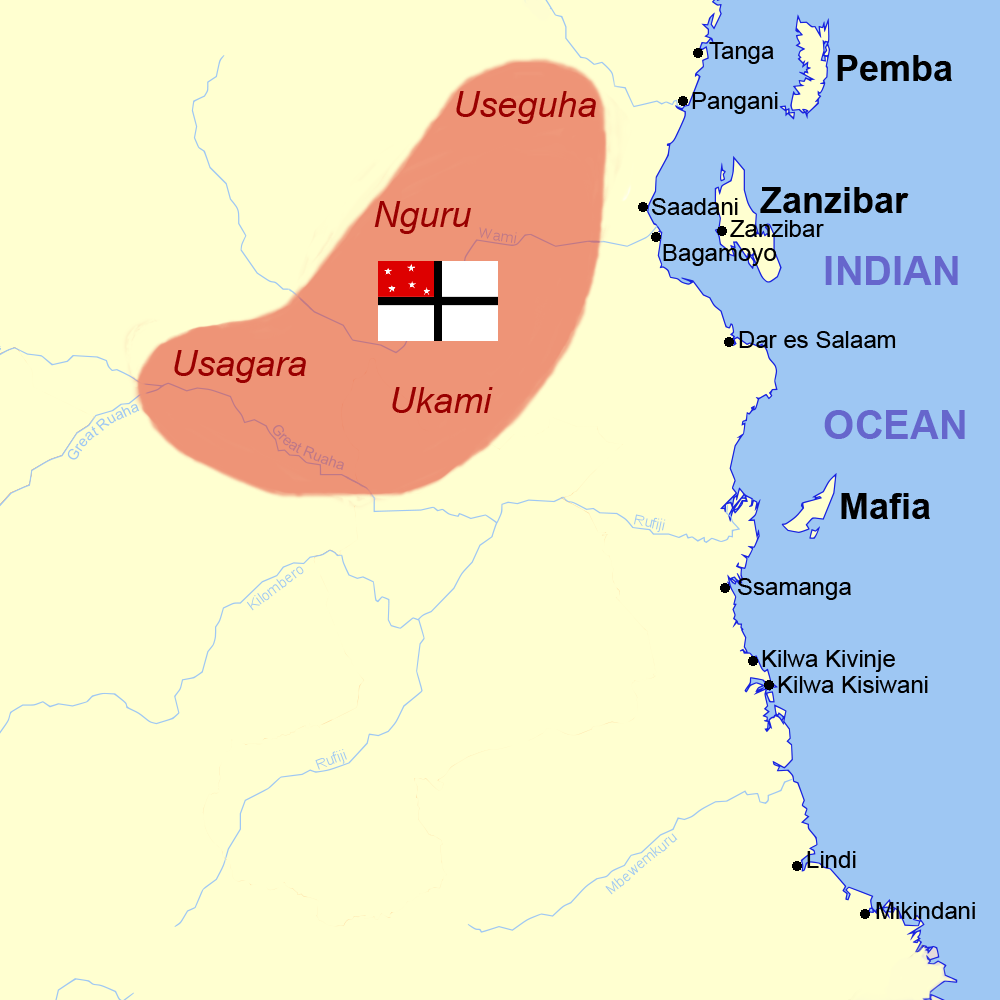
First territory ("Petersland") claimed by the German East Africa Company 1885

The German East Africa Company (German: Deutsch-Ostafrikanische Gesellschaft, abbreviated DOAG) was a chartered colonial organization that brought about the establishment of German East Africa, a territory which eventually comprised the areas of modern Tanzania, Burundi, and Rwanda. The company originated in 1884 as the Gesellschaft für deutsche Kolonisation (Society for German Colonisation) with the aim of trading in Africa. The German protectorate of Wituland (within modern Kenya) originated as a separate German sphere of influence in 1885.

In April of the same year, the company leased the coastal strip opposite Zanzibar from Sultan Khalifa bin Said for 50 years. Its attempt to take over the administration led to a general revolt along the coast of what is now Tanzania. The company could hold Dar es Salaam and Bagamoyo only with the help of the German navy. In 1889 it had to request the assistance of the German government to put down the rebellion.

In 1891, after it became apparent that the company could not handle its dominions, it sold out to the German government, which began to rule German East Africa directly. The company initially continued to operate its many activities, including mines, plantations, railways, banking, minting, etc., before it consented to relinquish them to the German colonial administration and other organizations. It subsequently operated as a land company within the German territory.

During World War I, Britain eventually occupied German East Africa. Both its military and that of Germany recruited and impressed thousands of Africans to serve as porters and workers supporting soldiers during the warfare on the continent. Each side destroyed countless African villages as the conflicts were waged across the colonies.

The flag of the German East Africa Company featured a stylised representation of the constellation of the Southern Cross.

== Founding ==
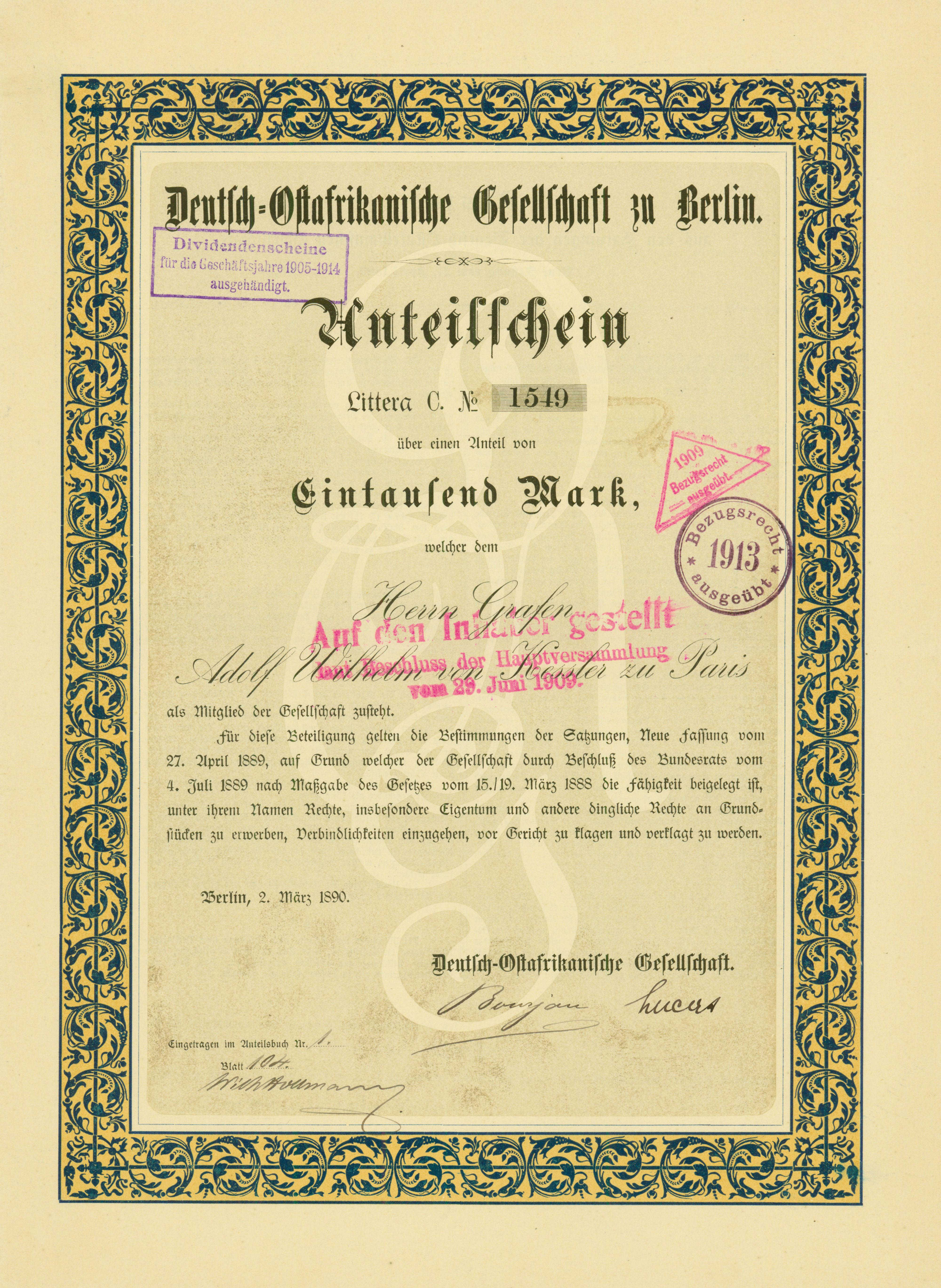
Share certificate of the German East Africa Company, issued 2 March 1890

One of the reasons for the formation of the German East Africa Company was politics occurring inside Germany. According to the Kolonialpolitischer Führer, German Imperialism was conceived in the 1850s when the growth of the economy due to industrialization caused German businessmen to look beyond Germany for business prospects. Later in the century, a newly unified Germany had to take a part in the exploration and expansion overseas if it were to be among the world's leading imperial powers. Being a large manufacturing country that both bought and sold goods, it had made sure its stake in resources was guarded. Gustav Schmoller, an economist, had a desire for a large naval fleet which was linked to this very idea of expanding the empire. Twenty million people were estimated to have moved to Germany from other countries in the 1900s, and the colonies would be a good place to hold some of the population. The leaders of the country made an effort to show the German people how the industry and its workers prospered from German imperialism.

The wealth that could be gained from Africa sparked interest from Germany. The African colonies were where natural resources and consumers could be found. Hunting wild animals was a popular sport at the turn of the century, and Africa had this to offer. Products available from Africa were important imports to Germany, and one view of the era was that the most important resource of Africa was the native people. At the beginning of the 20th century, the Amani Research Institute in the Usambara Mountains became an important centre for agricultural and botanical research. Reginald Moreau, Adolf Engler and other German scientists wrote important publications on the area's plant and animal life.

== Operations ==
Farming and mining took place in all territories the German East African Company occupied. The German colonizers were exporting many different types of goods, such as coffee, rubber, to Europe. In addition, they were building roads and railways to connect the regions where their company was operating.

== People involved in the company ==
=== Carl Peters ===
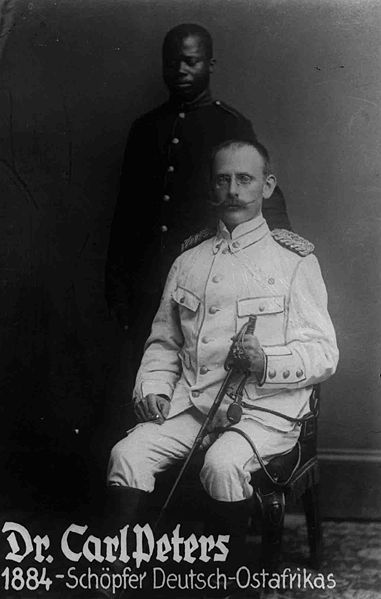
Carl Peters in 1884

Carl Peters was born on September 27, 1856, in Hanover, Germany. Peters was awarded scholarships to attend college, where he studied history, philosophy, and law, and became a successful journalist. After some time, Peters became interested in colonization, and he then changed his focus in life to become one of the principal founders of the German East Africa Company. He made significant contributions towards the company, which made him a widely recognized explorer. For example, Peters convinced the indigenous peoples of East Africa to give Germany control of their land, allowing Germany to have a colony in East Africa. He was able to do this by impressing the natives by firing guns, wearing impressive clothing, and flying flags. After the Germans took control, Peters became the administrator of the region until his dismissal because of his brutal treatment of the natives. He was known by the natives as "mkono wa damu", meaning "the man with blood on his hands". He was put on trial and found guilty, although the decision was criticized by the German press. His poor treatment of the indigenous people earned him an end to his otherwise successful career, and because of the extreme negative response, he lost most of his prestige; many streets named after him have since been renamed, and he is neglected by most historians.

=== Hermann von Wissmann ===
Hermann von Wissmann was born on September 4, 1853, in Frankfurt, Germany. He joined the Army, and after just four years, he became a lieutenant. Wissmann was later involved in a duel for which he was sentenced to jail, but this was not all a negative, because he met an African explorer with whom he traveled to Africa. While in Africa with the explorer, Wissmann became associated with the German East Africa Company, and he obtained high recognition from the leaders in that region. Eventually, an uprising of the indigenous people against the German occupation occurred, and Wissmann, with his extensive background in the military, became essential to fight the rebellion. He was extremely successful in his military operations, and in a little time, he was able to silence the rebels and revive German control. After the rebellion, Wissmann went on to colonize the rest of the German colony until he returned to Germany. Contrary to Carl Peters, Wissmann reportedly treated the indigenous with respect: he insisted on fairness, respect for customs, and use of Swahili (the native language). Some consider him “Germany’s Greatest African”, and because of that, several monuments were erected to commemorate his accomplishments.

=== Julius von Soden ===
Julius von Soden is not as highly recognized as other people involved in the German East Africa Company, but he did bring an important item to East Africa—schooling. Soden was a governor of German East Africa, and in 1892, he established the first school. Soden felt that a school for boys, free of religious influences, would greatly help the German presence in Africa. Instead of forcing the native people to work or taking over their land, Soden brought a positive to this underdeveloped area to help it grow.

=== Eduard von Liebert ===
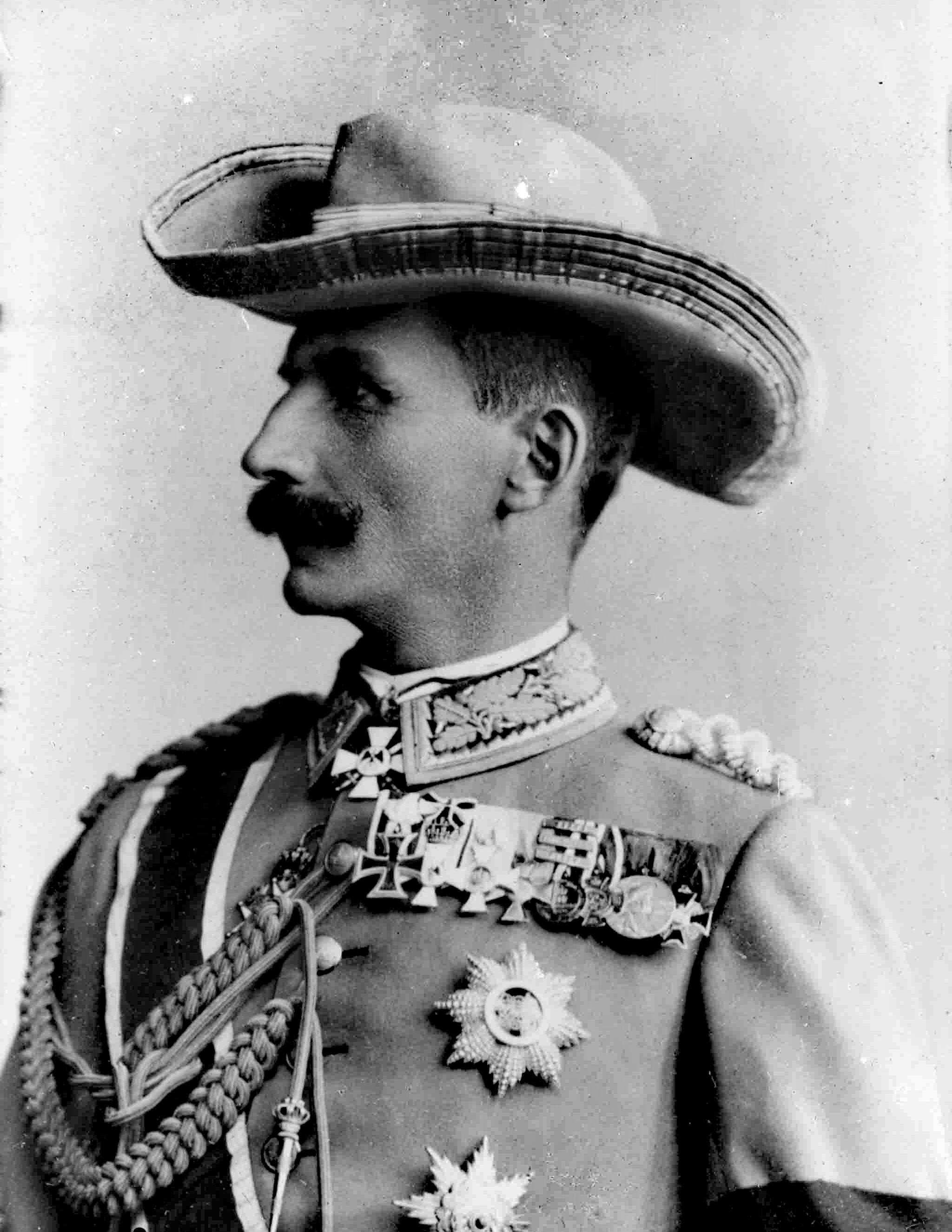
Eduard von Liebert

Similar to Soden, Eduard von Liebert also helped develop East Africa's infrastructure. Under the command of Liebert, East Africa was able to develop hospitals, social facilities, railroads, and more. The railroads, however, were arguably the most important of these. East Africa was able to produce a large surplus of agricultural products, and now these goods could be shipped to markets. At the time, railroads were necessary to industrial growth, so with the German contributions, the countries of East Africa had a head start industrialising over nearby regions. This large project took many years to finish; it was completed in 1914—29 years after the beginning of the German colonization.

=== Tom von Prince ===
Tom von Prince was born on January 9, 1866, to the British police governor of the British island colony of Mauritius and a German mother. With the death of his father, the mother returned to Germany (Silesia), and entered Tom in an academy for young Prussian male aristocrats. Since Europe was quiet and offered no military advancement, he finally joined Wissmann's Kaiserliche Schutztruppe (called the Wissmann Truppe) and liked seeing himself as a hero. By 1890, Tom von Prince was involved in German East Africa as a lieutenant attempting to control 'the Street of Caravans' under control of the Wissmann Truppe.

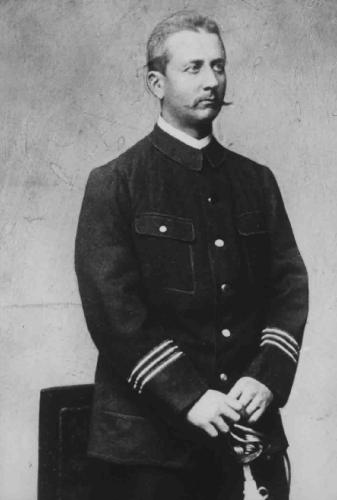
Emil von Zelewski

Since the Hehe, under Mquawa, had only attacked and harassed the Germans, leading to the loss of Commander Emil von Zelewski and many of his men, Tom Prince was sent far inland to Lake Nyassa, with a civilian representative of the Antislavery Committee, Wynecken. Here he met Wissmann, who lent him Bauer, the Wissmann's safari leader. The three, Prince, Wynecken, and Bauer, were to encircle the Hehe under Mqwawa, with the help of less than 20 Atongas and a few hundred Sangu, enemy of the Hehe.

=== Others ===
While it is important to go into detail about the more significant and accomplished people involved in the company, it is also necessary to realize that a handful of people could not run the company on their own. Many governors—other than the ones listed above—allowed it to run smoothly throughout the German occupation: Friedrich von Schele, Gustav Adolf von Götzen, Albrecht von Rechenberg, and Heinrich Schnee. As well as governors, many other people helped operate the colony: soldiers who fought to allow Germany to have a colony in Africa, and all of the other people who worked there on a day-to-day basis. Although most of the credit for founding the company and colony is given to a select number of people, none of it would be possible without the collective efforts of everyone in the company.

== See also ==
- Emil Grallert
- Wituland
- Reichskolonialbund
