= José Luis Munárriz =

Spanish literary critic, translator and writer

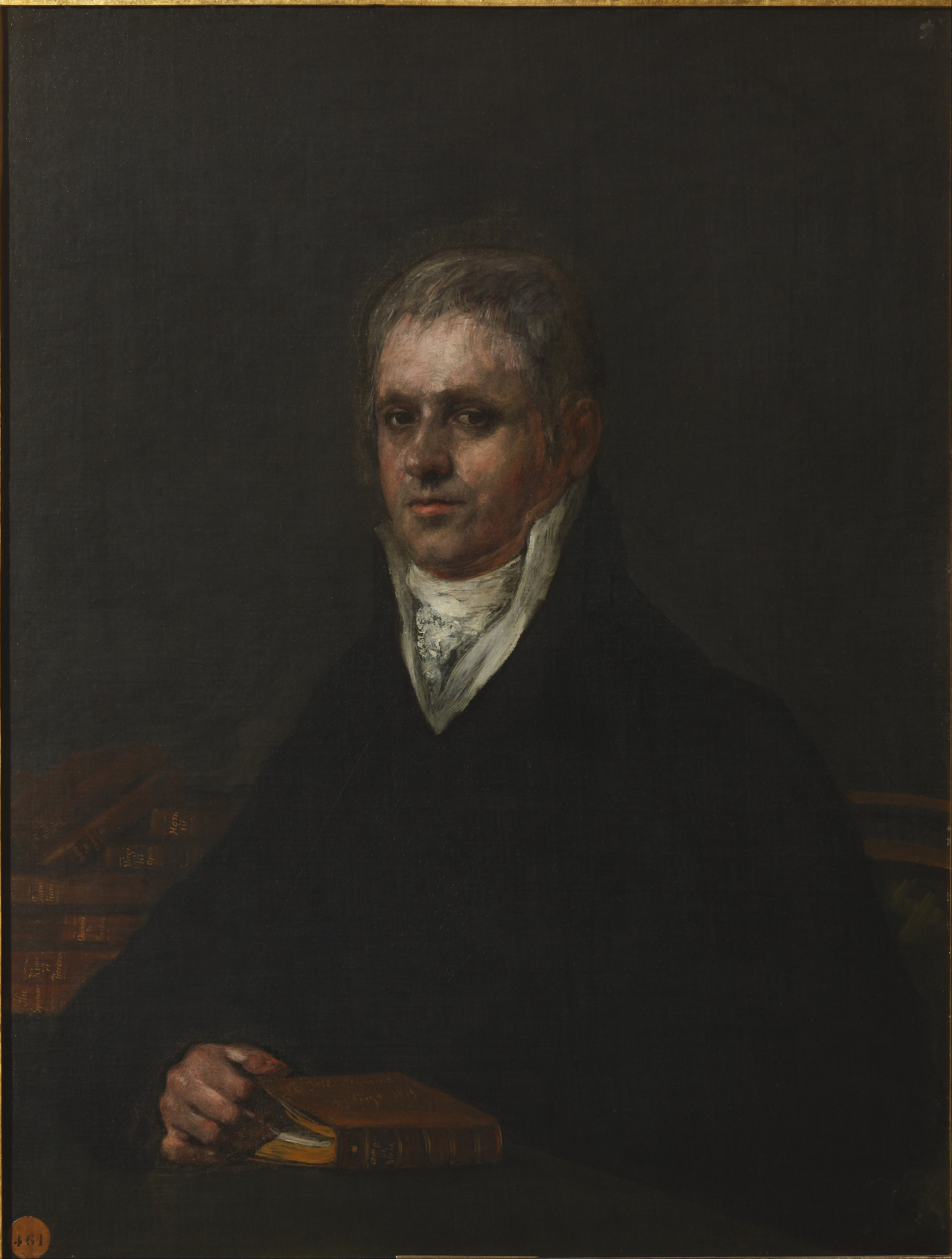
- Born: José Luis Munárriz Iraizoz; 26 August 1762; Estella-Lizarra, Spain
- Died: 18 July 1830 (aged 67); Madrid, Spain
- Education: University of Salamanca
- Occupation: Author
- Writing career
- Pen name: Pablo Zamalloa
- Language: Spanish
- Genres: Poetry, essay, literary criticism

Seat H of the Real Academia Española
- In office November 1814 – 18 July 1830
- Preceded by: Bernardo de Iriarte
- Succeeded by: Alberto Lista

José Luis Munárriz (1762–1830) was a Spanish literary critic, translator and writer.

== Biography ==
Munárriz completed his literary career, which ended at the age of twenty-two, at the University of Salamanca, where he remained until 1796 in order to complete his studies. He practiced literary criticism in the Semanario de Salamanca under the pseudonym Pablo Zamalloa. He settled in Madrid in 1796 and entered the service of the Philippine Company, where he first obtained the job of secretary. On 2 October of that same year he was elected an honorary member of the Real Academia de Bellas Artes de San Fernando; he was in charge of studying and reforming the teaching of the arts and on 1 May 1807, he was appointed its secretary, a position from which he resigned due to incompatibilities with other jobs in 1815, although he continued as a chaplain.

With the Napoleonic invasion he emigrated to Galicia and returned to Madrid in 1813. On 30 March 1815 he was appointed director of the Philippine Company. He was a friend of the liberal poet Manuel José Quintana and published numerous verses in the daily press, but was known above all for his translations, especially the Lecciones sobre la Retórica y las Bellas Letras (1798–1799), published in 1783 by the Scottish Hugh Blair, to which he added a study on six poems of Spanish cultured epics; in the third reissue of 1822 he also added an essay on Spanish literature, anticipating Romanticism in some respects. He published a Compendium of this work in 1815. In 1814 he was elected a full member by the Royal Spanish Academy.

With the liberal revolution of Rafael del Riego, he was a member of the Patriotic Society of Pamplona in 1820. He published Suplemento al Correo Universal de Literatura y Política, o Refutación de sus números 1 y 2 en lo relativo a la Compañía de Filipinas (1820). From 1821 to 1823 he was an individual of the General Directorate of Studies and in 1822 a member of the Board of Freedom of the Press. He was also a deputy to the Cortes for Navarre between 1822 and 1823.

== Works ==
- Lecciones sobre la Retórica y las Bellas Letras (Madrid, 1798–1799, 4 vols., 2nd edition Madrid, 1804)
- La Tragedia de Macbeth by William Shakespeare, 1819. (translation)
- Suplemento al Correo Universal de Literatura y Política, o Refutación de sus números 1 y 2 en lo relativo a la Compañía de Filipinas (Madrid, 1820, dated 30 June)
