= Ainara Osoro =

Basque political scientist, sociologist, professor and politician

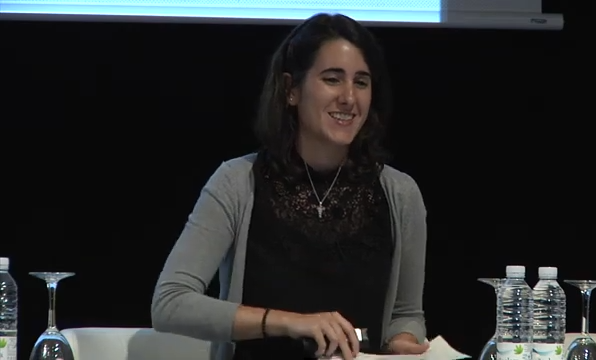
- Ainara Osoro at the presentation of the "European Guide to Social Innovation"

Councillor of the Soraluze-Placencia de las Armas City Council
- Incumbent
- Assumed office 2023

Personal details
- Born: Ainara Osoro Txurruka; 7 April 1987 (age 39) Soraluze-Placencia de las Armas (Basque Country); Spain
- Party: EH Bildu
- Education: University of the Basque Country (Lic., PhD); Autonomous University of Barcelona (MA); Bordeaux Montaigne University (PhD)
- Occupation: Political scientist, sociologist, professor and politician
- Awards: Bachelor's Degree Extraordinary Award (2009)

Ainara Osoro Txurruka (born in Soraluze-Placencia de las Armas on 7 April 1987) is a Basque political scientist, sociologist, professor and politician.

== Biography and career ==
Ainara Osoro was born in Soraluze-Placencia de las Armas (Basque Country) on 7 April 1987. She studied a degree in political and administration sciences at the University of the Basque Country. She graduated first of her class, top honours and was awarded the Bachelor's Degree Extraordinary Award. She later completed a master's degree in work and social policies at the Autonomous University of Barcelona (UAB).

He completed doctoral studies in political science, in the branch of public administration sciences, at the University of the Basque Country and at the Bordeaux Montaigne University (France). She was a university researcher in the department of sociology and social work of the University of the Basque Country and in the research centre Sinnergiak Social Innovation Centre (Innobasque). Osoro was one of the researchers who participated in the creation of the “European Guide to Social Innovation” of the European Union, presented by the European Commission at the European Conference of Social Innovation. She is specialized in public administration sciences and administration innovation. She is a full member of the College of Professionals of Political Science and Sociology of Catalonia.

She has also worked in the field of volunteering, collaborating with the Emmaús Social Foundation. In 2012 she was living and working in Peru for almost a year, working in the social field.

She has lived in Soraluze-Placencia de las Armas (Basque Country), Barcelona (Catalonia), France and Peru (South America).

== Political career ==
In the 2023 Spanish local elections, Osoro was a candidate for councillor of the Soraluze-Placencia de las Armas City Council, for the EH Bildu coalition, with Unai Larreategi as a candidate for mayor of Soraluze-Placencia de las Armas. The coalition obtained an absolute majority of votes and Osoro was elected councillor.

In the 2023-2027 legislature, Unai Larreategi (EH Bildu) was elected mayor of Soraluze-Placencia de las Armas, succeeding Iker Aldazabal (PNV). In this legislature, Osoro served as person in charge and spokesperson for equality and youth. Among her measures were, among others, the creation and promotion of the Soraluze Women's Empowerment School, to help women develop a gender perspective and reclaim their rights or the general plan against sexist violence and aggressions or the purple points for attention to victims.

== Publications ==
=== Research (selection) ===
- Osoro, Ainara (2017). Innovation in Public Administration in the 21st Century. XIII Congress. Spanish Association of Political Science and Administration (AECPA).XIII Congress. Spanish Association of Political Science and Administration (AECPA).
- Osoro, Ainara (2014). “Public Sector: Internal and External Approaches to Innovation”. International Conference. Masovian Center of Social Policy. Warsaw (Poland), 2014.
- Osoro, Ainara (2014). The Public Sector: Catalyst for Social Innovation. SINNERGIAK Social Innovation, UPV-EHU, Innobasque, European School of Social Innovation.
- Osoro, Ainara (2013). Rescindex - A regional index to measure social innovation. Methodology and results. SINNERGIAK Social Innovation, UPV-EHU, Innobasque.

=== Opinion (selection) ===
- Osoro, Ainara (2016). "The precariat of France against the labor reform". Pil-pilean Soraluze Magazine • April 2016 • N. 314.

== See also ==
- Soraluze-Placencia de las Armas
- Pello Otxandiano
