= Emil Grallert =

German diplomat (1848–1923)

Emil Grallert (1848 - 1923) was German Consul in Zanzibar from 1877 to 1884. He was born to Anastasius Grallert and Johanna Pabst in Hamburg on 21 November 1848. He died on 16 January 1923.
