= List of chartered companies =

Companies created by charter

A chartered company is an association with investors or shareholders that is incorporated and granted rights (often exclusive rights) by royal charter (or similar instrument of government) for the purpose of trade, exploration, or colonization, or a combination of these.

== Notable chartered companies (with years of formation) ==
=== Austrian ===
- 1719 Imperial Privileged Oriental Company
- 1722 Ostend Company
- 1775 Austrian East India Company (Note: The Austrian Netherlands (now Belgium), active in India.)

=== British ===
- 1711 South Sea Company
- 1752 African Company of Merchants (abolished 1821)
- 1792 Sierra Leone Company
- 1824 Van Diemen's Land Company
- 1825 Canada Company
- 1825 New Zealand Company
- 1835 South Australian Company
- 1847 Eastern Archipelago Company
- 1853 Standard Chartered
- 1881 British North Borneo Company
- 1886 Royal Niger Company
- 1888 Imperial British East Africa Company
- 1889 British South Africa Company

The article Chartered Companies in the Encyclopædia Britannica Eleventh Edition, by William Bartleet Duffield, contains a detailed narrative description of the development of some of the companies in England and, later, Britain.

=== Danish (and Norwegian until 1814) ===
- 1616 Danish East India Company (Note: Governed Danish India from Tranquebar.)
- 1671 Danish West India Company
- 1721 Bergen Greenland Company
- 1732 Danish Asiatic Company
- 1749 General Trade Company
- 1774 Royal Greenland Trading Department

=== Dutch ===
- 1599–1602 Brabantsche Compagnie
- 1602–1799 Dutch East India Company (VOC)
- 1614 New Netherland Company
- 1614–1642 Noordsche Compagnie (Nordic Company)
- 1621–1792 Dutch West India Company (Note: The original West India Company collapsed in 1674, and the New West India Company took its place in 1675 and persisted until 1792.)
- 1683–1795 Sociëteit van Suriname
- 1720 Society of Berbice
- 1824 Nederlandsche Handel-Maatschappij

=== English ===
- 1407 Company of Merchant Adventurers of London
- 1552 Bristol Society of Merchant Venturers
- 1553 Company of Merchant Adventurers to New Lands
- 1555 Muscovy Company
- 1577 Spanish Company
- 1579 Eastland Company
- 1581 Turkey Company
- 1583 Venice Company
- 1585 Barbary Company
- 1592 Levant Company (Note: Merger of the Turkey Company and the Venice Company.)
- 1600 East India Company (Note: Became the largest colonial empire in the 19th century.)
- 1606 Virginia Company
- 1606 Plymouth Company
- 1610 London and Bristol Company
- 1616 Somers Isles Company
- 1618 Guinea Company
- 1619 New River Company
- 1620 Council for New England
- 1629 Massachusetts Bay Company
- 1629 Providence Island Company
- 1635 Courteen association
- 1670 Hudson's Bay Company
- 1672 Royal African Company
- 1691 Hollow Sword Blade Company
- 1694 Bank of England

=== French ===
- 1604 First French East Indies Company
- 1627 Company of One Hundred Associates
- 1635 Company of the American Islands
- 1664 French West India Company
- 1664 Louis XIV's East India Company
- 1672 Compagnie du Sénégal
- 1717 John Law's Company
- 1723 French Indies Company
- 1785 Compagnie de Calonne

=== German ===
- 1682 Brandenburg African Company
- 1752 Emden Company
- 1882 German New Guinea Company
- 1884 German East Africa Company
- 1885 German West African Company
- 1891 Astrolabe Company

=== Polish-Lithuanian ===
- 1783–1793 Trade Company Poland (Black Sea Trade Company)

=== Portuguese ===
- 1482 Companhia da Guiné
- 1628 Portuguese East India Company
- 1888 Companhia de Moçambique
- 1891 Companhia do Niassa

=== Russian ===
- 1799–1867 Russian-American Company

=== Scottish ===
- 1634 Guinea Company of Scotland
- 1698 Company of Scotland

=== Spanish ===
- 1728–1785 Guipuzcoan Company of Caracas
- 1755–1785 Barcelona Trading Company
- 1785–1814 Royal Company of the Philippines

=== Swedish ===
- 1288 Stora Enso
- 1626–1680 Swedish South Company, also called New Sweden Company (Note: Created in connection with the Swedish colony New Sweden (Nya Sverige); absorbed by the Dutch; presently in Delaware.)
- 1649–1667 Swedish Africa Company (Note: On the short-lived Swedish Gold Coast.)
- 1731–1813 Swedish East India Company
- 1786–1805 Swedish West India Company (Note: Created in connection with the colonisation of Saint Barthélemy.)
- 1738 Swedish Levant Company (Note: A failed attempt to organise Swedish trade in the eastern Mediterranean region.)

== Gallery ==
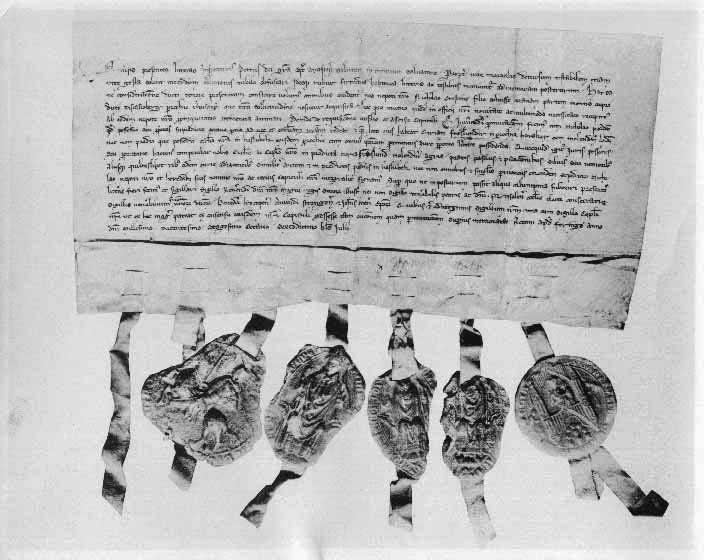
Share certificate of the Stora Kopparberg mine, dated 16 June 1288

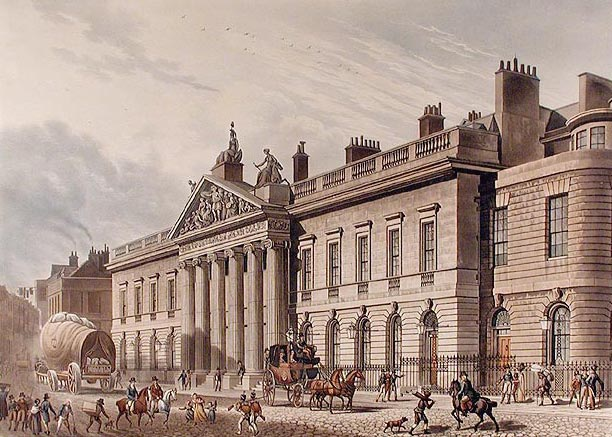
The British East India Company's headquarters in London

The arms of the British South Africa Company

== See also ==
- American Colonization Society
- Articles of association
- Articles of incorporation
- Articles of organization
- British colonisation of the Americas
- Certificate of incorporation
- Charter
- Collegium
- Congressional charter
- Government-sponsored enterprise
- Hong (business)
- South Manchuria Railway and Chinese Eastern Railway

== Bibliography ==
- Bown, Stephen R. (2010). Merchant Kings: When Companies Ruled the World, 1600–1900. New York: Thomas Dunne Books. ISBN 9780312616113.
- Ferguson, Niall (2003). Empire—How Britain Made the Modern World. London, United Kingdom: Allan Lane.
- Micklethwait, John; Wooldridge, Adrian (2003). The company: A short history of a revolutionary idea. New York: Modern Library. ISBN 9780679642497.
- Ross, R. (1999). A Concise History of South Africa. Cambridge, United Kingdom: Cambridge University Press. ISBN 9780521575782.
