= Action of 8 January 1780 =

1780 naval battle

- Part of the American Revolutionary War
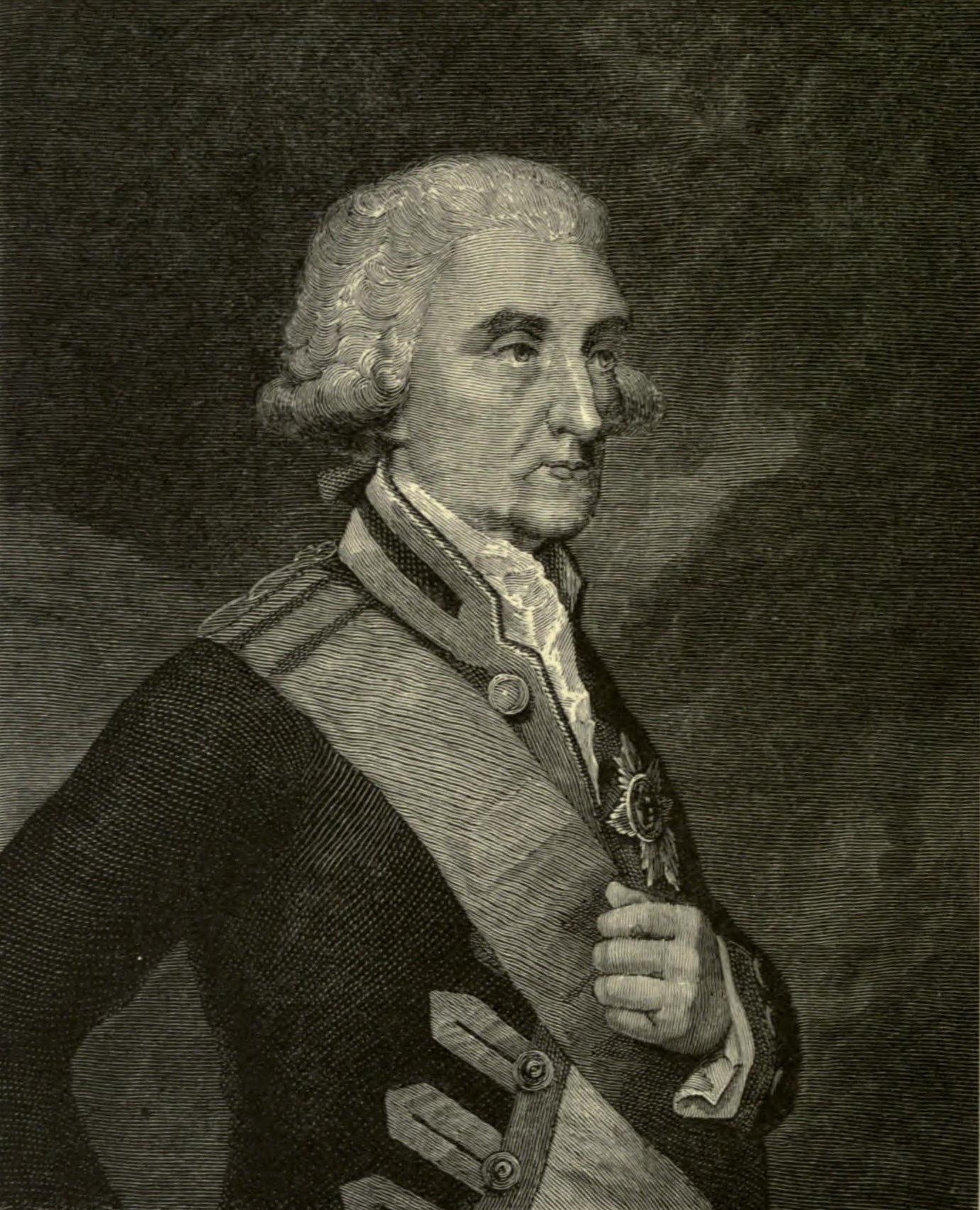
- George Rodney. Engraving from Edward Francis Finden
| Date | 8 January 1780 |
| Location | off Cape Finisterre 43°00′N 20°15′W |
| Result | British victory |

Belligerents
| Spain: Caracas company | Great Britain |

Commanders and leaders
| (Spain) Don Juan Augustín de Yardi (POW) | (Kingdom of Great Britain) George Rodney |

Strength
| 1 ship of the line 4 frigates 2 small warships 15 merchant ships | 20 ships of the line 6 frigates |

Casualties and losses
| All ships captured | Light |

The action of 8 January 1780 was a naval encounter off Cape Finisterre between a British Royal Naval fleet under Admiral Sir George Rodney, and a fleet of Spanish merchants sailing in convoy with seven warships of the Guipuzcoan Caracas Company, under the command of Commodore Don Juan Augustin de Yardi. During the action the entire Spanish convoy was captured. Rodney's fleet was en route to relieve Gibraltar, and this action took place several days before Rodney's engagement and defeat of a Spanish fleet at the Battle of Cape St. Vincent.

== Background ==
One of Spain's principal goals upon its entry into the American Revolutionary War in 1779 was the recovery of Gibraltar, which had been lost to England in 1704. The Spanish consequently planned to retake Gibraltar by blockading and starving out its garrison, which included troops from Britain and the Electorate of Hanover. The siege formally began in June 1779, with the Spanish establishing a land blockade around The Rock. The matching naval blockade was comparatively weak, and the British discovered that small fast ships could evade the blockaders, while slower and larger supply ships generally could not. By late 1779, however, supplies in Gibraltar had become seriously depleted, and General George Eliott appealed to London for relief.

A supply convoy was organized, and in late December 1779 a large fleet sailed from England under the command of Admiral Sir George Brydges Rodney. Although Rodney's final destination was the West Indies, he had secret instructions to first resupply Gibraltar and Menorca.

== Action ==
On 4 January Rodney parted with the ship of the line HMS Hector under Sir John Hamilton, and the frigates HMS Phoenix, HMS Andromeda and HMS Greyhound under Captains Hyde Parker, H. Bryne and William Dickson respectively, to escort the West Indies-bound merchants. The following day Rodney encountered a Spanish convoy consisting of 22 ships, bound from San Sebastián to Cádiz.

He closed on them, the copper sheathing on some of his ships allowing them to outsail the Spanish. The whole convoy was captured, except for one merchant vessel. Vessels which had been carrying naval stores to the Spanish fleet at Cádiz, and baled goods for the Royal Guipuzcoan Caracas Company were sent back to England, escorted by HMS America and HMS Pearl.

== Aftermath ==
Rodney found the Spanish ships to be carrying provisions useful to Gibraltar and so used them to relieve the British forces there. In addition Rodney commissioned and manned the captured Spanish flagship, the 64-gun Guipuzcoana, naming her HMS Prince William, in honour of Prince William, who was present at the engagement. Rodney remarked in his despatches to the Admiralty that the loss of the ships "must greatly distress the enemy, who I am well informed are in much want of provisions and naval stores". Several days later Rodney engaged and defeated a Spanish fleet under Don Juan de Lángara at the Battle of Cape St Vincent, on 16 January 1780, before going on to relieve Gibraltar and Menorca. The 16-gun San Fermin that was captured in this action was also commissioned to serve in the Royal Navy, and then would be recovered by the Spanish in April 1781.

== Ships involved ==
The order of battle is as reported by Beatson.

=== British fleet ===
- HMS Sandwich (90) Admiral Sir George Brydges Rodney, Captain Walter Young
- HMS Prince George (98) Rear-Admiral Robert Digby, Captain Philip Patton
- HMS Royal George (100) Rear-Admiral John Lockhart Ross, Captain J. Bourmaster
- HMS Alcide (74) Captain J. Brisbane
- HMS Ajax (74) Captain S. Uvedale
- HMS Bedford (74) Captain Edmund Affleck
- HMS Culloden (74) Captain George Balfour
- HMS Cumberland (74) Captain J. Peyton
- HMS Edgar (74) Captain John Elliot
- HMS Montagu (74) Captain J. Houlton
- HMS Monarch (74) Captain Adam Duncan
- HMS Shrewsbury (74) Captain Mark Robinson
- HMS Terrible (74) Captain J. Douglas
- HMS Resolution (74) Captain Chaloner Ogle
- HMS Invincible (74) Captain S. Cornish
- HMS Defence (74) Captain James Cranston
- HMS Marlborough (74) Captain T. Penny
- HMS Dublin (74) Captain S. Wallis
- HMS America (64) Captain S. Thompson
- HMS Bienfaisant (64) Captain John MacBride
- HMS Convert (32) Captain Henry Harvey
- HMS Pearl (28) Captain George Montagu
- HMS Triton (24) Captain Skeffington Lutwidge
- HMS Pegasus (24) Captain John Bazely
- HMS Porcupine (24) Captain Lord Hugh Seymour
- HMS Hyaena (24) Captain Edward Thomson

=== Spanish fleet ===
==== Caracas Company warships ====
- Guipuzcoano (64) Commodore Don Juan Augustin de Yardi, Captain Don Tomás de Malay
- San Carlos (32) Captain Don Firmin Urtizberea
- San Rafael (30) Captain Don Luis Aranburu
- Santa Teresa (28) Captain Don Jose J. de Mendizabal
- San Bruno (26) Captain J. M. de Goicoechea
- San Fermín (16) Captain J. Vin. Eloy Sanchez
- San Vicente (10) Captain Don José de Ugalde

==== Merchants ====
- Nuestra Señora de L'Oves
- San Francisco
- La Concepción
- San Nicolás
- San Jerónimo
- Divina Providencia
- San Gavilán
- San Pacora
- San Lauren
- La Providencia
- La Bellona
- Esperanza
- Le Cidada de Mercia
- La Amistad
- San Miguel
