= Royal Company of the Philippines =

Spanish trading company

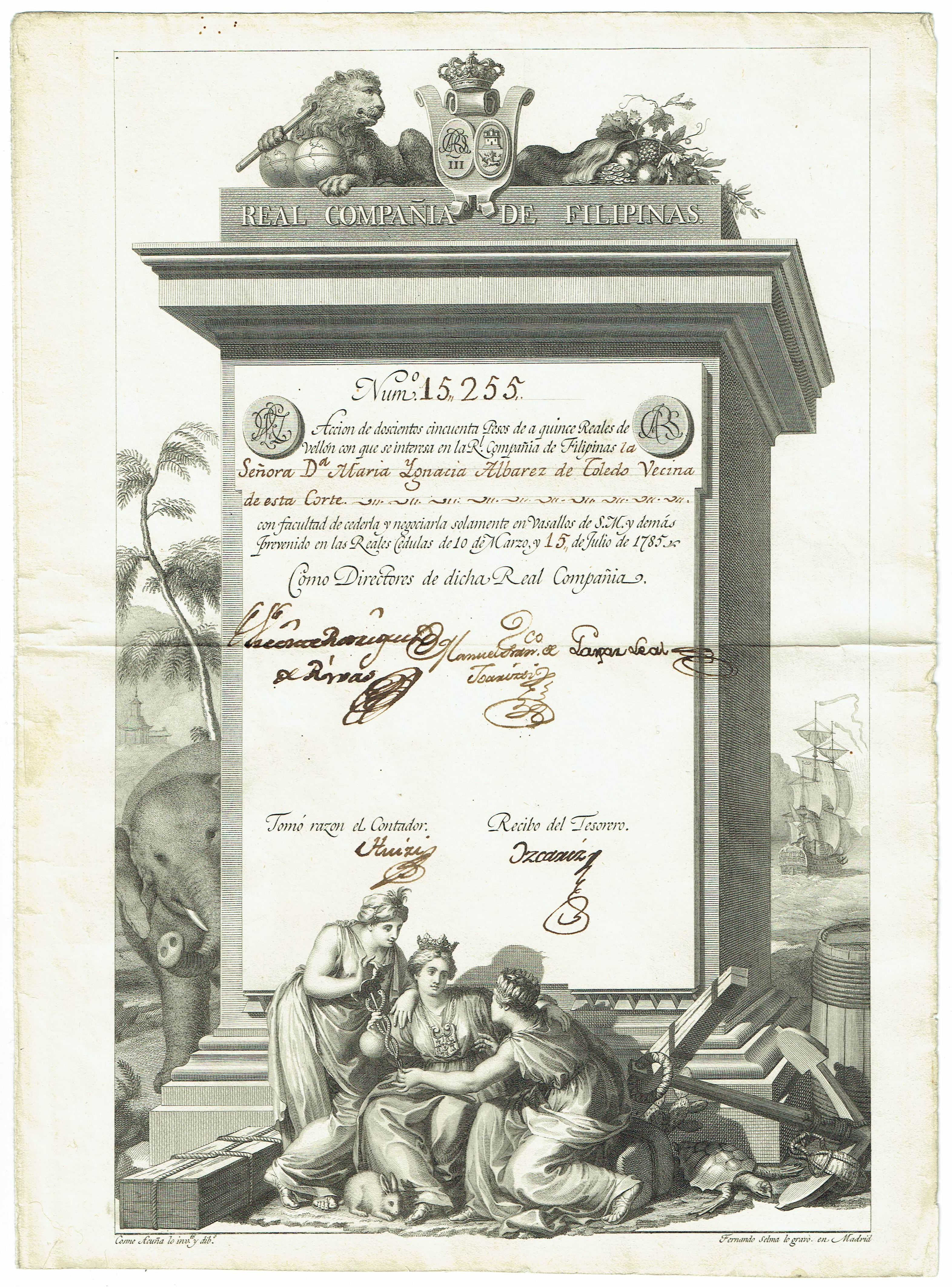
Decree of the Philippine Company in 1785

The Royal Company of the Philippines (Spanish: Real Compañía de Filipinas) was a chartered company founded in 1785, directed to establish a monopoly on the Spanish Philippines and all surrounding trade. It weakened in importance until it was dissolved in the 1830s. Its direct predecessor was that of the Guipuzcoan Company of Caracas.

== Founding ==
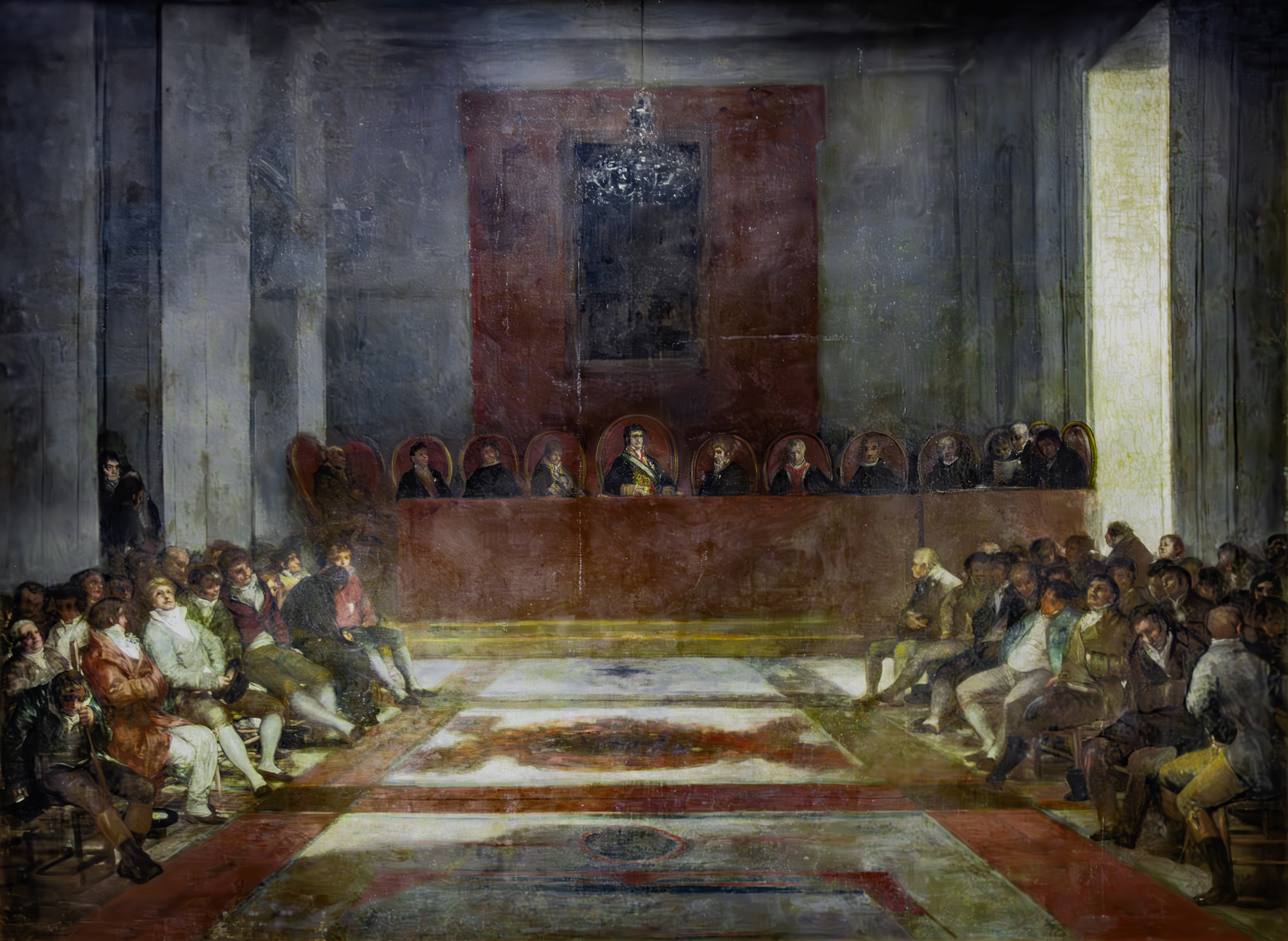
The Board of the Philippines, large-format oil on canvas by Francisco Goya in 1815 (Goya Museum, Castres, France).

As Francisco Cabarrús, director of the Guipuzcoan Company, feared his company was about to be dissolved in the 1780s, he proposed to unite the trade of the Americas with that of Asia through the Philippines, incorporating the rights of the old company to the new one. His plan was adopted, and the Royal Company of the Philippines was established on March 10, 1783, before being institutionalized on March 10, 1785 by a royal decree of Charles III of Spain, being directed by Francisco Cabarrús.

The purpose of the company was to promote direct trade between the Philippines (then a colony of the Spanish Empire) and the mother country. The royal decree also provided for closing the port of Manila to any foreign vessel. Therefore, only the company could import goods from New Spanish Mexico, China or the Philippines.

=== Activity ===
The Royal Company of the Philippines was founded with an initial capital of 3,000 shares of 250 pesos each, with the incipient Spanish financial companies participating in the operation. Later, it increased its capitalization with the issuance of bonds. The company quickly grew rich (at the end of 1785, its capital was 10 million pesos) and sought to modernize the archipelago's export capacities; it quickly took control of the other companies and preserved the already existing commercial strategy that favored export crops: indigo, coffee, sugar, spices, cotton.

The Spanish government secured the link with its provinces of the Spanish East Indies through this company. Until then he had awarded seat contracts to different companies. The last seat was contracted with the Royal Company of the Philippines in 1787, which maintained a line with the Philippines during the 19th century.

=== Monopoly and Decline ===
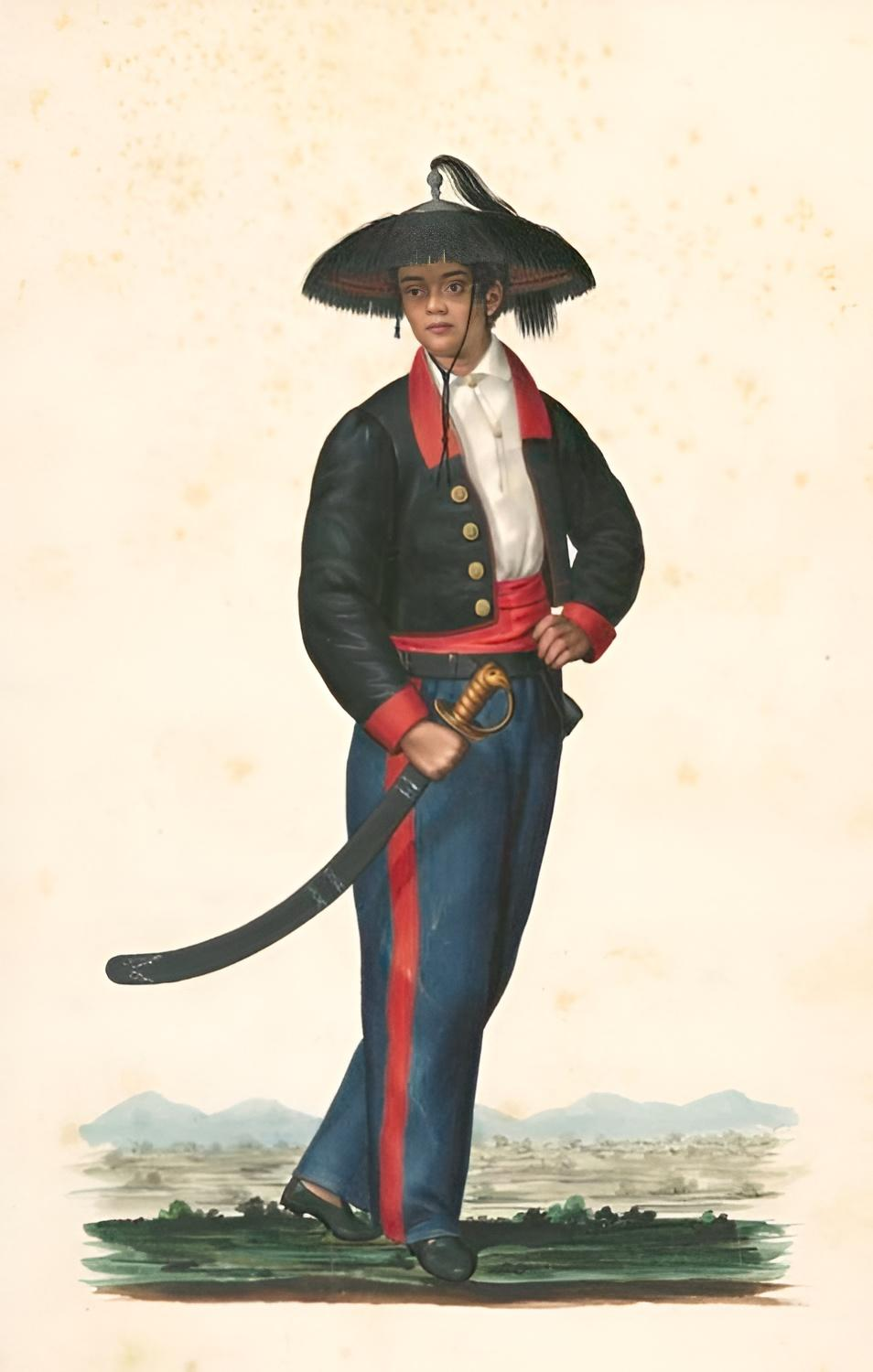
Guardia de vinos assigned to look after the government's monopolies, such as arrack and tobacco, from both which the government derives considerable revenue.

As the company quickly grew to establish monopolies in other branches of the Spanish overseas trade, other companies, feeling the reduction of monopoly rights, began a struggle with the Royal Company of the Philippines. The most serious conflicts took place with the merchants of Manila and the Filipinos themselves, who used the route to Acapulco for their own activities, or with the United Kingdom, which maintained Asian trade as the first power.

The writer José Luis Munárriz entered the service of the company in 1796, where he became secretary and, later, director on March 30, 1815.

These problems led to a progressive decline of the company from 1794, becoming practically inoperative at the late 18th to early 19th century. The company ceased its functions in 1829, after the loss of the Spanish colonial empire American territories, and was declared extinct by decree of October 6, 1834 during the regency of Isabella II.
