= Soraluze-Placencia de las Armas =

- Municipality
- Soraluze-Placencia de las Armas
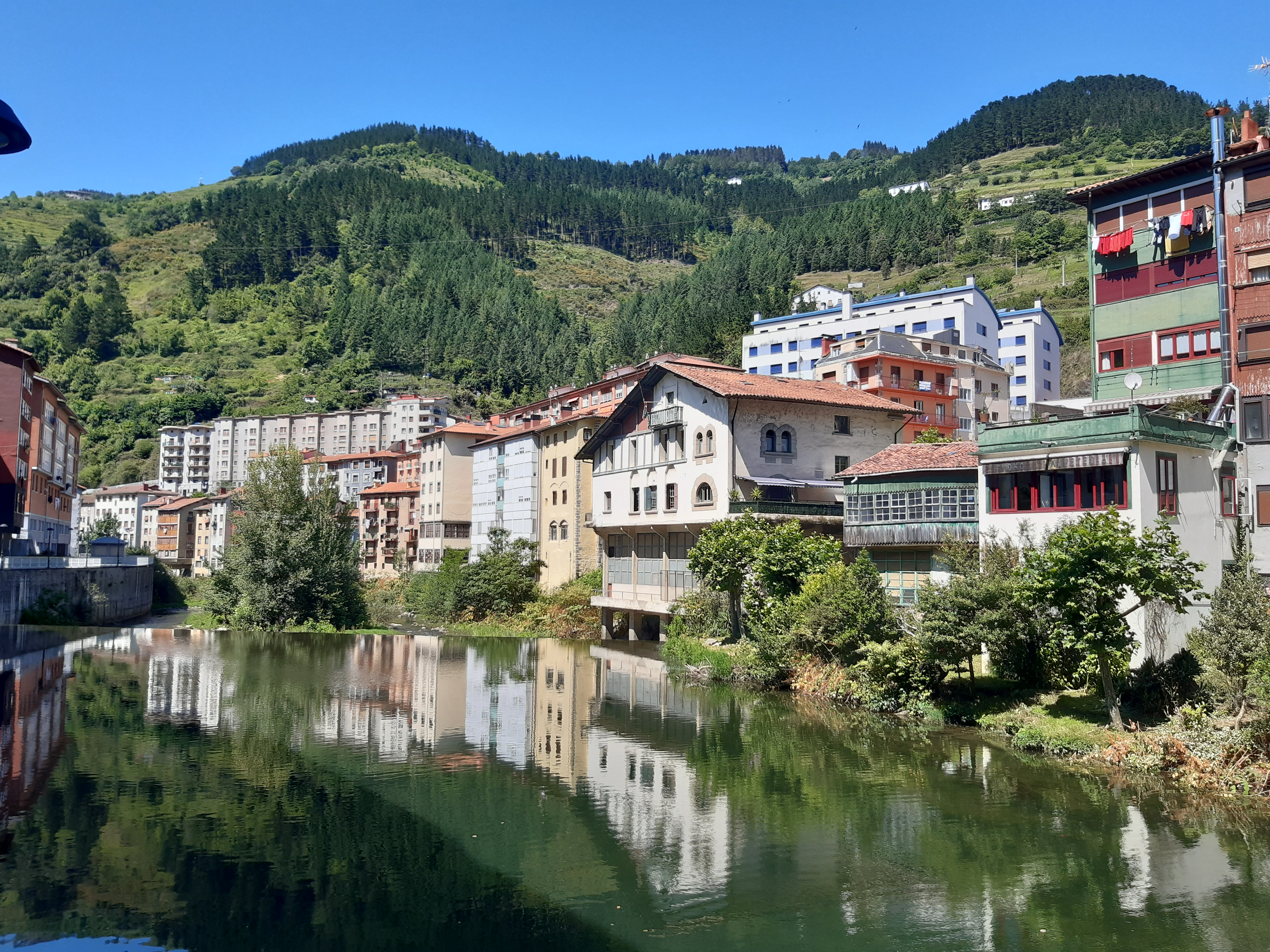

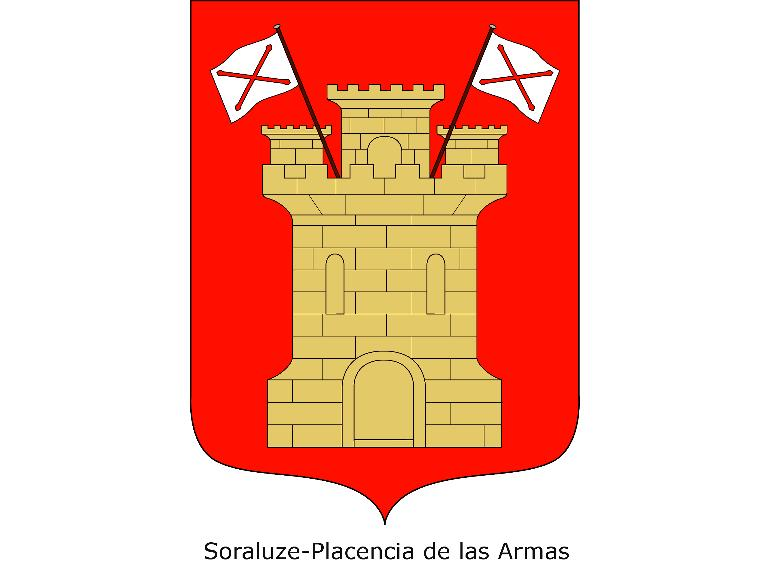
- Coat of arms

- Location in Spain Soraluze-Placencia de las Armas (Spain)
- Coordinates: 43°10′29.2″N 2°24′42.2″W
- Country: Spain
- Autonomous community: País Vasco
- Province: Gipuzkoa
- Eskualdea: Debabarrena
- Founded: 15 October 1343

Government
  - Alcalde: Iker Aldazabal (Basque Nationalist Party)

Area
  - Total: 14.22 km^{2} (5.49 sq mi)
- Elevation: 111 m (364 ft)

Population (2025-01-01)
  - Total: 3,857
  - Density: 271.2/km^{2} (702.5/sq mi)
- Demonym(s): Placentino, -na; Soraluzetarra
- Time zone: UTC+1 (CET)
  - Summer (DST): UTC+2 (CEST)
- Postal code: 20590
- Official language(s): Basque and Spanish
- Website: Official website

Soraluze (Basque) or Placencia de las Armas (Spanish), officially Soraluze-Placencia de las Armas, is a town located in the province of Gipuzkoa, in the Basque Country, Spain.

The town of Placencia de las Armas has been involved since its foundation in the manufacture of weapons of all kinds. At its founding in 1343, it called Placencia Soraluze then in the fifteenth century it added "las Armas" or "weapons" to its name in reference to its main industry. In this village the Royal Guns Factory ended weapons manufacturing in the middle of the twentieth century.

Its coat of arms consists of the following elements: a field of gules a castle battlements three gold exiting their respective sides small white flags with the cross of Burgundy. The field is surrounded by a rope whose sides have two lions and various weapons. The head of a crown has 9 points.

== Placencia ==
The town was founded in 1343 by king Alfonso XI of Castile under the name of "Placencia". The name "Placencia" is common, under similar forms, as seen in other foundations of earlier medieval villages like Plasencia, Piacenza or Plencia. It is considered that this name derives from the phrase ut Placeat (for pleasure or to please) expression with which the king or lord in turn used as the basis for a village or town's name. For example, the motto of the Plasencia Extremadura is Deo et ut Placeat hominibus (to please God and men). The early Basque presence in Newfoundland is commemorated by the town name Plasencia, documented in the archives as early as 1563.

== The Basque place name, Soraluce ==
Soraluce (with the current Basque script is written Soraluze) appears to be the former name of the place where the town was founded. The king ordered the inhabitants of Herlaegia and Soraluze populate the newly created village of Placencia. When in 1397 the representatives of the village attended the first General Assembly of Gipuzkoa, they attended under the name of Placencia Soraluce, according to the records of the meeting.

In Basque language Soro means "field" or "garden" and luze means "long"; so that the name seems to mean pretty obviously "long field or orchard." In addition Placencia Soraluce is settled in a narrow valley along the Deba river, which matches up well with the name.

== "De las armas" or "Of the arms" ==
In the sixteenth century the government greatly developed its arms industry in Placencia, so that people no longer called Placencia Soraluce but became known as Placencia de las Armas. Until the last quarter of the twentieth century, the arms industry has remained at the base of the economy of the town and today the village retains that designational fruit of its historical economic activity.

== The colloquial and official name ==
In Basque the town is colloquially known under different names like, Plaentzia, Plazentzia, Plaentxi and Plaentxia. In addition to these "traditional" denominations the "historical" name was Soraluze. When formalizing the Basque name of the town the 'form' Soraluze was eventually chosen. Until 2005 the euskaltzaindia admitted Soraluze and Plaentzia as synonymous.

From 1988 the official name of the township was changed to 'Soraluze-Placencia de las Armas' . Although it considered a bilingual designation; Soraluze, Basque name, and Placencia de las Armas, in Spanish; others use it as a compound name.

The adjective in Spanish is placentino or placentina. In Basque soraluzetarra or plaentxiarra are used.

== Soraluze-Placencia de las Armas City Council ==
Soraluze-Placencia de las Armas City Council (2023-2027):

Mayor

- Unai Larreategi (EH Bildu)

Councillors

- Maite Quintanilla Lete (EH Bildu)
- Ana Maiztegi Gorostidi (EH Bildu)
- Iker Uzin Larrañaga (EH Bildu)
- Ione Alberdi (EH Bildu)
- Ainara Osoro (EH Bildu)
- Iker Aldazabal (PNV)
- Verónica Galarraga (PNV)
- Ramón Gallastegi (PNV)
- Patricia Borinaga (PSE-EE)
- Iñaki Rubio (PSE-EE)
