= Guipuzcoan Company of Caracas =

Spanish Basque trading company in the 18th century

Royal Guipuzcoan Company of Caracas
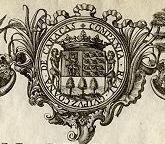
- Type: Public company
- Industry: Trade
- Founded: 1728
- Defunct: 1785
- Fate: Dissolved
- Successor: Royal Company of the Philippines
- Headquarters: San Sebastián, Madrid, (Gipuzkoa) Spain
- Area served: Venezuela Province

The Royal Guipuzcoan Company of Caracas (Spanish: Real Compañía Guipuzcoana de Caracas) was a Spanish chartered company which existed from 1728 to 1785. It conducted trade with Spain's overseas colonies and maintained its own fleet of warships and privateers to defend the company's merchantmen. In 1785, after having several of its ships captured by the Royal Navy during the American Revolutionary War, the company was merged with the Barcelona Trading Company to form the Royal Company of the Philippines.

== History ==
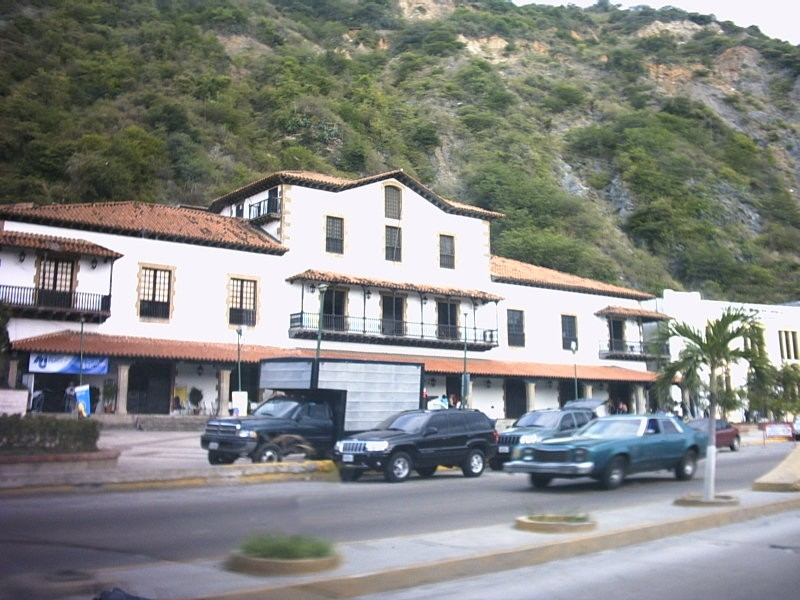
The preserved colonial office of the Guipuzcoan Company of Caracas in La Guaira

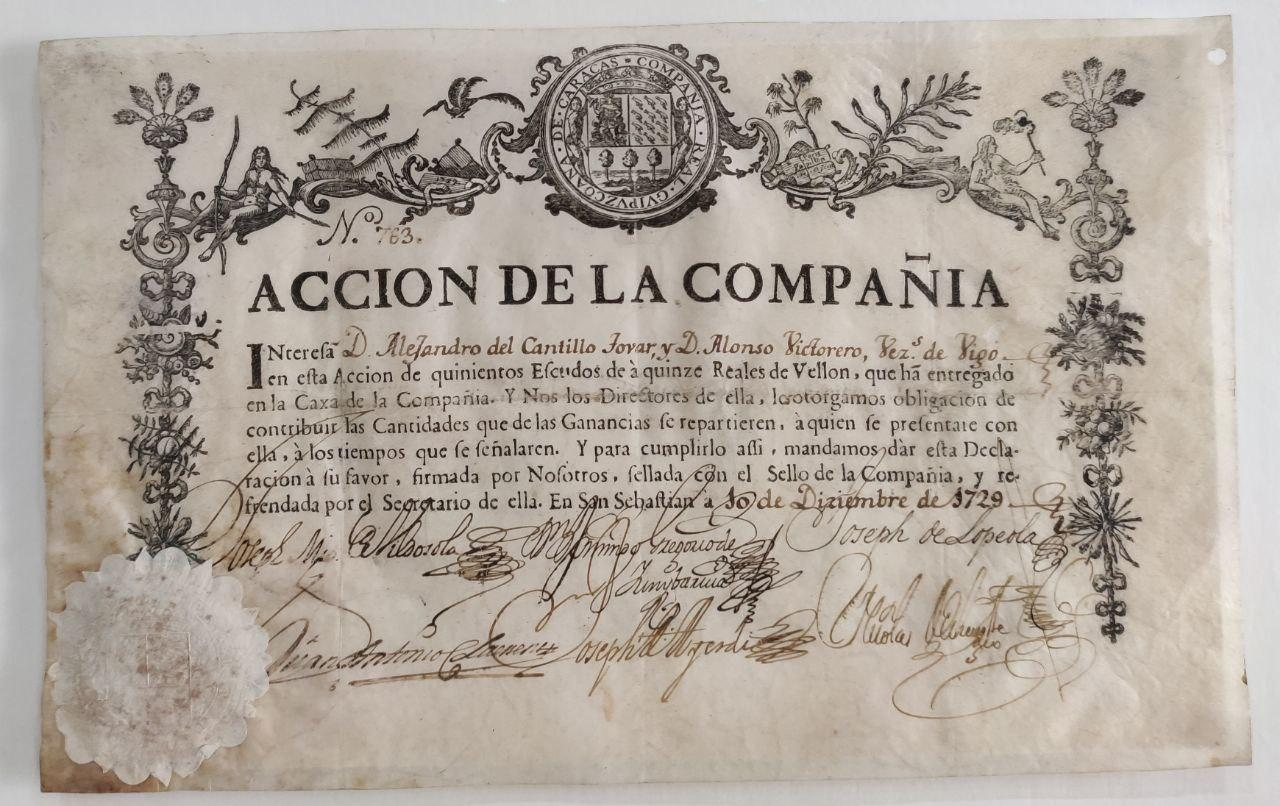
Stock certificate of the Guipuzcoana Company (Madrid, 10 December 1729

=== Foundation ===
Since 1503, under the Habsburg kings, all Spanish trade with America had been conducted through the port of Seville (and after 1717, Cádiz) under a monopoly that prevented other cities, including Barcelona or San Sebastián, from trade with the Americas, or the Indies as they were known. Tentatively by the late 17th century Basques goods had reached the Indies via the Spanish coastal trade to Cádiz and this grew slowly until the Guipuzcoan company was founded by a group of wealthy Basques from the province of Gipuzkoa in 1728. The specific aim of the Basque company, acting almost autonomously with tasks of military nature at their own command and expense, was to break the de facto Dutch monopoly on the cocoa trade in the Captaincy General of Venezuela.

It was initially based in San Sebastián and received its royal decree on September 25, 1728, by Philip V of Spain. Its creation was part of the larger Bourbon Reforms to control unlicensed trading, especially in tobacco, which existed along the Orinoco River between Spanish colonists and Dutch, British and French merchants, who were preferred by the landholders of Canary Islander descent as trade partners. The Venezuelan possessions and their managerial wealthy Creole class thus operated detached from the metropole. The Venezuelan colonial system turned into an embarrassment and hardly productive for the Spanish Crown in terms of revenue. Between 1700 and 1728 only five vessels set sail from Spain to Venezuela.

The establishment of the company resulted from negotiations engaged with the Basque governments in the aftermath of the bloody military campaign ordered by Philip V of Spain over the western Basque districts. The government of Gipuzkoa in particular came up with a proposal for the re-establishment of commerce with Venezuela that would suit the Basque interests and those of the Spanish king alike. The plan was approved, with the Basques getting total exclusivity on that commerce.

The Guipuzcoana Company was the only body entitled to sell European goods in Venezuela (or Caracas) Province and to export Venezuelan agricultural products to Spain. Goods imported on to other Spanish territories would incur no custom duties on the Ebro river according to the treaty signed with the Spanish king Philip V, and the company was able to trade freely throughout Europe. The company would in turn export iron commodities to Venezuela. The Guipuzcoana Company became the first shares based company in Spain, participated by Basque shareholders and the king of Spain.

Since 1743, the company received permission to charter vessels under the French flag, which could trade directly with Venezuela. The main beneficiaries of that decision were no doubt the coast of the Basque province of Labourd, and Bayonne.

=== Operations and effects in Venezuela ===
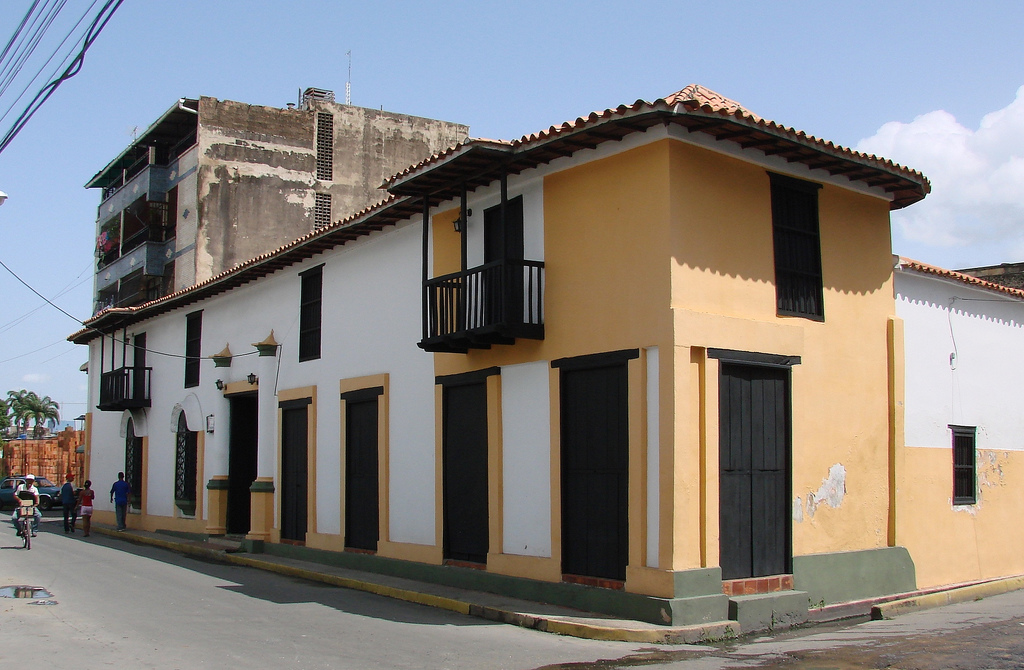
The company's seat in Cagua

The company had a substantial influence over the economy of Venezuela over the period 1730-1784.

The company began operating in 1730—four ships departed from San Sebastián taking on board a crew of 561 and 40–50 cannons. The vessels were hailed with frontal hostility by the Venezuelan Creoles, a refusal to sell cocoa to the company, and an uprising against the newcomers and the local Spanish garrison, until control was re-established.

The Company's ships used to travel overloaded, in order to increase the profits coming from the cocoa monopoly. The very high profitability of the business and the overexploitation of the ship's cargo capacity allowed the crews to smuggle. The Company needed to recover the investment with the greatest possible profit margin, and the Crown required this to be a tool of war. In June 1733, the San Ignatius de Loyola was preparing for his return to Passages from La Guaira. He returned with a cocoa overload 5.5 percent higher than his actual capacity, not counting the space occupied by other effects, such as food, water, ammunition, etc. He made his journey in 76 days, almost 10 days longer than the average of the Company's ships.

The Basques started to settle down in Venezuelan territory on wealthy haciendas that boosted plantations and agricultural production. However, the move was resented by other established Creoles based on the fact that it brought down prices to be sold to the company. The Basques established settlements, built dock facilities, and fortifications. The term un gran cacao became a nickname for a member of the new powerful class (and to this day the term is used jocularly in Venezuela for a VIP). It did not help smaller farmers who continued to participate in illegal trading.

The company was instrumental in the development of large-scale cocoa production along the valleys of the coast and encouraged the production of such crops as tobacco, indigo, cotton and coffee. In addition, the company promoted the exploration and settlement of frontier areas, most famously under the border expedition of 1750-1761 headed by a company agent, José de Iturriaga y Aguirre, which resulted in new settlements in the Guayana region.

The company's control of the major ports of La Guaira and Puerto Cabello meant that it effectively monopolized the legal trade of the other Venezuelan provinces. In addition, the company's strict control of much needed manufactured imports naturally created a lot of resentment in a region which depended on these. Several rebellions took place against the company and the Basques in which ethnic confrontation came to a head in 1749, which saw local criollos supported by the Dutch and British confront the powerful Basques supported by the Spanish Crown. The rebellion was led by Juan Francisco de León, a Canary Islander just replaced as Corporal of War (1749), but the Spanish Crown could not shrink from protecting its own interests by supporting the company, and quelling the uprising that very year.

=== Effects in Gipuzkoa ===
Apart from breaking the Dutch monopoly and creating significant wealth in the Basque port cities, the company provided a fast track to job positions for many Basques. The company's activity kept active Basque forges which were gradually declining in the face of growing competition from their British counterparts, and fed indirectly the arms factories of Soraluze (Placencia de las Armas) and Tolosa. Another outcome was the foundation in Bergara of the Royal Basque Society of Friends of the Country by a group under the leadership of Xavier María de Munibe e Idiáquez, Count of Peñaflorida, in 1765. Its model expanded to the Spanish heartland prompting the establishment of the "Sociedad Económica de los Amigos del País"—a type of Enlightenment think tank.

=== Later years ===
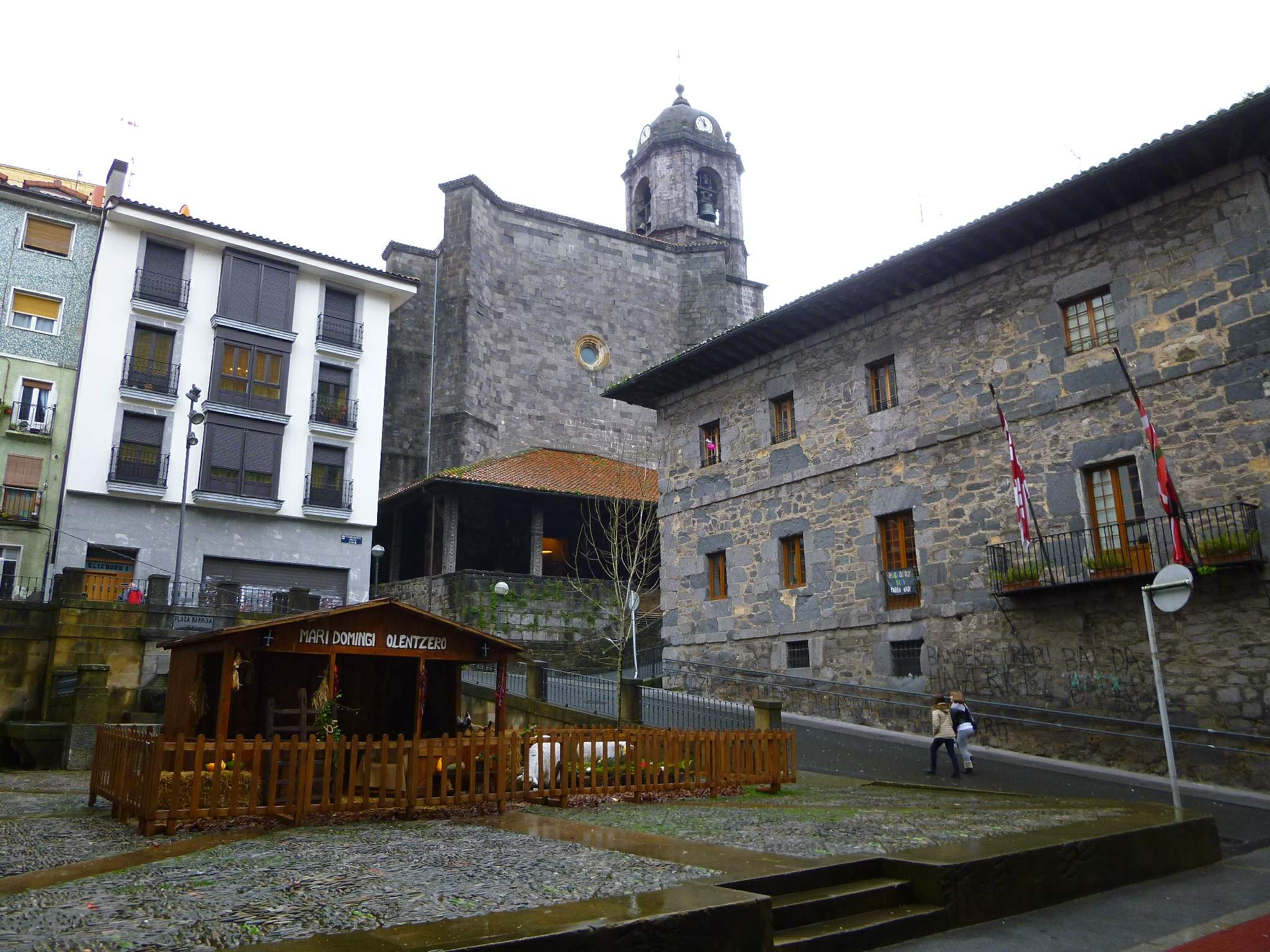
Soraluze (Placencia de las Armas), a key arms manufacturer for the company in Gipuzkoa

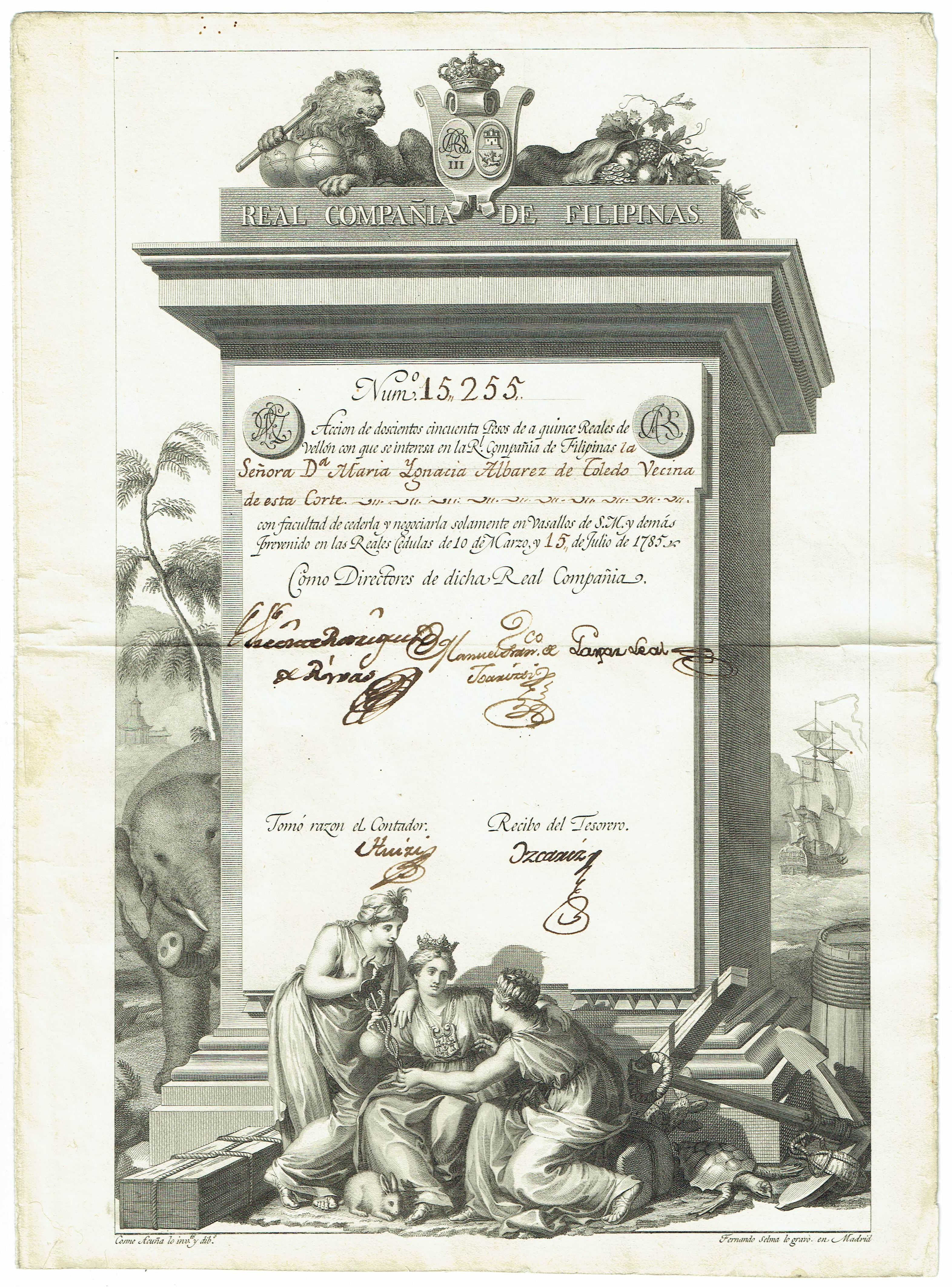
Share of the Real Compañia de Filipinas (Royal Philippine Company), issued 15. July 1785

In the last trip of the Saint Ignatius to La Guaira in 1741 at the sight on the reefs of the island of La Anegada the captain couldn't stop the ship from falling on starboard. About 300 people died in this tragedy. Thus the Sain Ignatius shipwrecked.

While Basque involvement increased after 1749, the Spanish Crown dealt a critical blow to the Basques when it weakened Basque grip over the company by transferring its headquarters to Madrid, a move contested by Gipuzkoa, and imposing a requirement to include a Spaniard in a board of directors of three (1751).

On October 1778, Charles III of Spain signed the Free Trade Regulations culminating the free trade process that had begun in 1765. The regulations were composed of 55 articles, expanded freedom of trade and enabled 13 metropolitan ports including Margarita Island and Trinidad Island. The ports of Venezuela mainland (La Guaira, Puerto Cabello, Cumaná, Maracaibo, and Angostura) were excluded to protect the interests of the Royal Gipuzkoan Company along with the ports of New Spain, for fear that the prosperity of this territory would lead to a lack of concern for other less active areas, which went against the guiding idea of the project.

During the American Revolutionary War, numerous ships of the company were captured by the Royal Navy, including in the actions of 8 January 1780 and 15 January 1782. On 8 January 1780, 7 warships and 15 merchantmen of the company were captured, and on 15 January 1782 2 of the company's merchant ships were captured. Combined this facts with the liberalization of commerce with Venezuela in 1778, the weakening company's monopoly came to an end. The Spanish Crown no longer saw the need for a monopolizing company to control and grow the economy, since by that time the Venezuelan economy had matured and been tightly linked with the markets of Spain and New Spain, which consumed most of its cocoa. The Spanish crown terminated the company's charter in 1784. A key effect of the Caracas Company, despite its eventual commercial failure, was that it guaranteed the place of Caracas in the captaincy-general. When the Crown established a high court (Real Audiencia) in the Captaincy General of Venezuela in 1786, it was sited in Caracas.

The owners of the Guipuzcoana Company merged it with the Barcelona Trading Company to form the Royal Company of the Philippines in 1785. In Caracas a consulado de mercaderes (a merchants' guild) replaced the company in 1793. One of the most active proponents of the move was François Cabarrus, 1st Count of Cabarrús, a prominent company stockholder hailing from a merchant family in Bayonne, Labourd, who was increasingly involved in Spanish finances and politics.

== See also ==
- Captaincy General of Venezuela
- Barcelona Trading Company
