= Spanish ship Fénix =

Spanish ship of the line

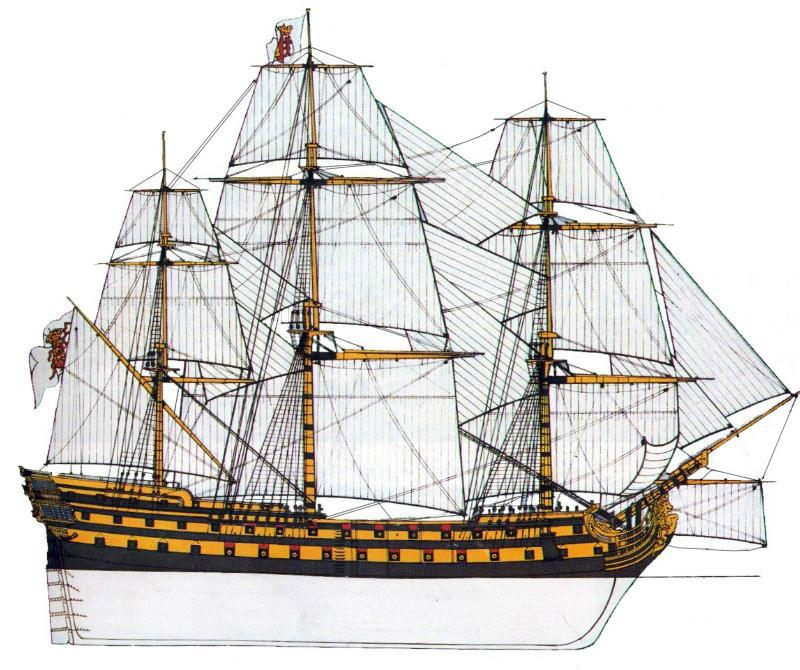
- Ship-of-the-line Fénix by Rafael Berenguer y Condé, Naval Museum of Madrid

History

Spain
- Name: Fénix
- Builder: Havana Dockyard
- Laid down: 1 July 1747
- Launched: 26 February 1749
- Commissioned: 1 December 1749
- Honours and awards: Participated in: Battle of Cape St. Vincent
- Captured: 16 January 1780, by Royal Navy

Great Britain
- Name: HMS Gibraltar
- Acquired: 16 January 1780
- Commissioned: February 1780
- Honours and awards: Participated in: Battle of Fort Royal; Invasion of Tobago; Battle of Cuddalore; Glorious First of June; Battle of Hyères Islands; Battle of the Basque Roads; Naval General Service Medal with clasp "Egypt"
- Fate: Broken up, 1836

General characteristics
- Class & type: 80-gun third-rate ship of the line
- Tons burthen: 2,184 25/94 (bm)
- Length: 178 ft 10 3/4 in (54.5 m) (gundeck); 144 ft 5 3/4 in (44.0 m) (keel)
- Beam: 53 ft 3 3/4 in (16.2 m)
- Depth of hold: 22 ft 4 in (6.8 m)
- Sail plan: Full-rigged ship
- Complement: 650
- Armament: Lower deck:30 × 24-pounder guns; Upper deck: 1780:32 × 18-pounder guns; 1781:32 × 24-pounder guns; QD: 1780:12 × 9-pounder guns + 2 × 68-pounder carronades; 1810:4 × 12-pounder guns + 8 × 32-pounder carronades; Fc: 1780:6 × 9-pounder guns; 1810:4 × 12-pounder guns + 2 × 32-pounder carronades

Fénix was an 80-gun ship of the line (navio) of the Spanish Navy, built by Pedro de Torres at Havana in accordance with the system laid down by Antonio Gaztaneta launched in 1749. In 1759, she was sent to bring the new king, Carlos III, from Naples to Barcelona. When Spain entered the American Revolutionary War in June 1779, Fénix set sail for the English Channel where she was to join a Franco-Spanish fleet of more than 60 ships of the line under Lieutenant General Luis de Córdova y Córdova. The Armada of 1779 was an invasion force of 40,000 troops with orders to capture the British naval base at Portsmouth.

As the flagship of Admiral Juan de Lángara, the ship fought at the Battle of Cape St. Vincent on 16 January 1780, where she was captured by the British Royal Navy and commissioned as the third rate HMS Gibraltar in March of that year. She spent a short while in the English Channel before joining Samuel Hood's squadron in the West Indies and taking part in the Capture of St Eustatius in February 1781 and the Battle of Fort Royal the following month. Gibraltar and five other ships were sent to stop a French invasion fleet bound for Tobago in May 1781, but found the French too powerful and had to withdraw. In November, her 18-pound guns were replaced with 24-pounders, after which, in February 1782, she sailed to the East Indies and in the following year participated in the Battle of Cuddalore.

At the start of the French Revolutionary War, Gibraltar served in the Channel Fleet, fighting at the Glorious First of June in 1794 before being sent to the Mediterranean in May 1795. In June, the ship was in an action off Hyères; then, in December 1796, she was badly damaged in a storm and had to return to England for major repairs. By June Gibraltar was back in the Mediterranean, serving in the navy's Egyptian campaign, where she remained during and beyond the Peace of Amiens, except for a short period when she was sent home for a refit.

Returning to the Channel in April 1807, Gibraltar joined the fleet under Admiral James Gambier, which fought the Battle of the Basque Roads in 1809. This was her last major action; the ship was taken out of service in 1813 and converted to a powder hulk. She became a lazarette in 1824, then was broken up in November 1836 at Pembroke Dock.

== Construction and armament ==
Fénix was a Spanish, two deck, ship of the line built in Havana from mahogany. Launched in 1749, her dimensions were 178 feet 10.75 inches (54.5 m) along the gun deck, 144 feet 6 inches (44.0 m) at the keel, with a beam of 52 feet 11.75 inches (16.1 m) and a depth in the hold of 22 feet 1.75 inches (6.8 m). This made her 2,184 35/94 tons burthen (bm).

Classed as an 80-gun third rate, Fénix was armed with thirty 24 pounders (11 kg) on her lower gun deck, thirty-two 18 pounders (8.2 kg) on her upper gun deck, twelve 9 pounders (4.1 kg) on the quarterdeck, and six on the forecastle. Her sister ship, Rayo, was later converted to a 100-gun, three-decker. She was wrecked at Trafalgar in 1805.

Fénix was captured by the British in 1780. She was copper sheathed and fitted out for British service at Plymouth Dockyard between April and August 1780 at a cost of £16,068.5.3d. The Admiralty changed her armament a number of times: in November 1781, the 18-pounders on her upper deck were upgraded to 24-pounders, and the same December two 68-pounder (31 kg) carronades were added. By 1810, the guns on her quarterdeck had been replaced with four 12-pounder (5.4 kg) guns and eight 32-pounder (15 kg) carronades, and on her forecastle with four 12-pounder guns and two 32-pounder carronades. Although large, two deck ships were favoured in other European navies, the British preferred to build three-deck third rates; the extra space making them better suited for flagships. After the capture of Fénix, the Admiralty began to see the advantages of a longer two-deck ship which was less prone to hog, almost as well armed as its three-decked counterparts, and relatively quick.

== Spanish service ==
Fénix was part of a squadron of eleven ships-of-the-line, accompanied by two frigates and two tartanes, sent to collect the new king, Carlos III, from Naples in 1759. Under Captain Gutierra de Hevia y Valdés and as the flagship of Lieutenant General Juan Jose Navarro, she set sail from Cádiz on 29 August. The squadron passed through the Straits of Gibraltar on 2 September, before stopping at Cartagena on 10 September to pick up supplies. On 28 September it arrived at its destination, where it was reinforced with five other men-of-war. The King embarked on 7 October, and the squadron arrived in Barcelona on 17 October.

Fénix was stationed in Cádiz in January 1762 and spent the next two years serving in the Mediterranean Sea, the Straits of Gibraltar, and the Atlantic Ocean. Fénix underwent several large repairs at the Arsenal de la Carraca between 1764 and 1765, where she remained stripped of her armament until 1769, under the command of Francisco Cotiella. In 1778 Fénix was recommissioned under Captain Félix Ignacio de Tejada, who was superseded by Captain Francisco Javier de Melgarejo y Rojas when Spain entered the American Revolutionary War in June 1779. Fénix immediately set sail for the English Channel, part of the fleet under Lieutenant General Luis de Córdova y Córdova, which was supposed to meet a French fleet at the Sisgaras Islands, off the northern coast of Spain. This Franco-Spanish Armada of 1779 of more than 60 ships of the line was to escort an invasion force of 40,000 troops across the Channel in a bid to capture the British naval base at Portsmouth. Córdova's ships were delayed by contrary winds, which forced them to keep close to the coast of Portugal. In consequence they did not arrive at the rendezvous until 22 July, by which time the French, short of supplies, had left. Although the two fleets would eventually unite, Fénix left for the Azores on 23 July with a squadron under Lieutenant General Antonio de Ulloa, to protect the Spanish anchorage and to face a British force of which the Spanish had received news.

=== The Moonlight Battle ===
By 1780, Fénix was 31 years old. She was neither a good sailer nor as well armed as her British counterparts, which carried 32 pounders (15 kg). Nevertheless, as the largest ship in a squadron comprising eleven ships-of-the-line and two frigates, she was serving as the flagship of Admiral Don Juan Lángara, when on 16 January 1780, she was seen by a British fleet commanded by Admiral George Rodney.

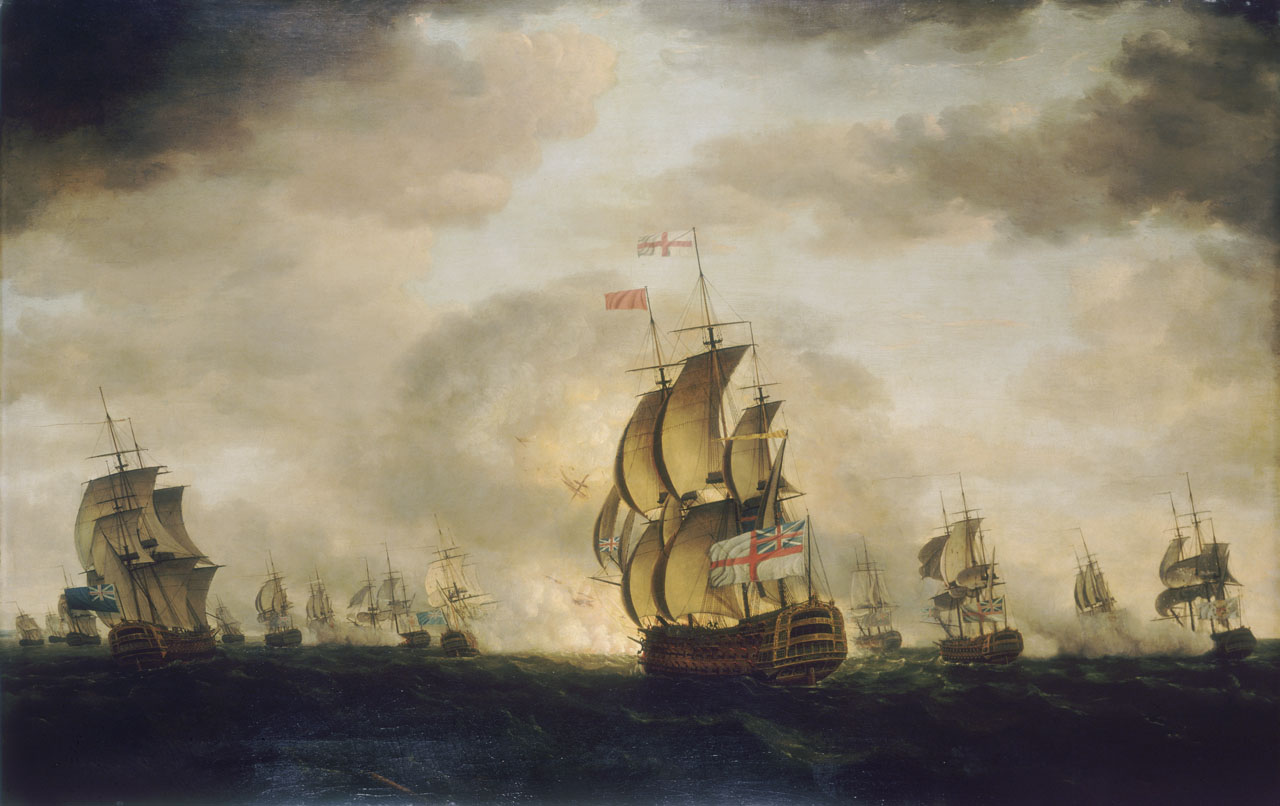
The moonlight Battle off Cape St Vincent, 16 January 1780, painting by Francis Holman, 1780, shows Santo Domingo exploding, with Rodney's flagship Sandwich in the foreground

The faster British ships closed, and battle began around 16:00. Santo Domingo, trailing in the Spanish fleet, received broadsides from the 74-gun ships HMS Edgar, HMS Marlborough, and HMS Ajax before exploding around 16:40. Marlborough and Ajax then passed the 70-gun Princessa to engage other Spanish ships. Princessa would eventually engage in an hour-long battle with HMS Bedford before striking her colours around 17:30. The chase continued into the dark; at 19:30, the 74-gun HMS Defence came upon Fénix and engaged her in a battle that lasted over an hour. Fénix was then broadsided in passing by another seventy-four, HMS Montagu, and the 90-gun HMS Prince George, wounding Lángara in the process. Fénix finally surrendered to the 64-gun HMS Bienfaisant, which arrived late in the battle but shot away Fénix's mainmast. At 21:15 Montagu engaged the 68-gun Diligente, which struck after her main topmast had been shot away.

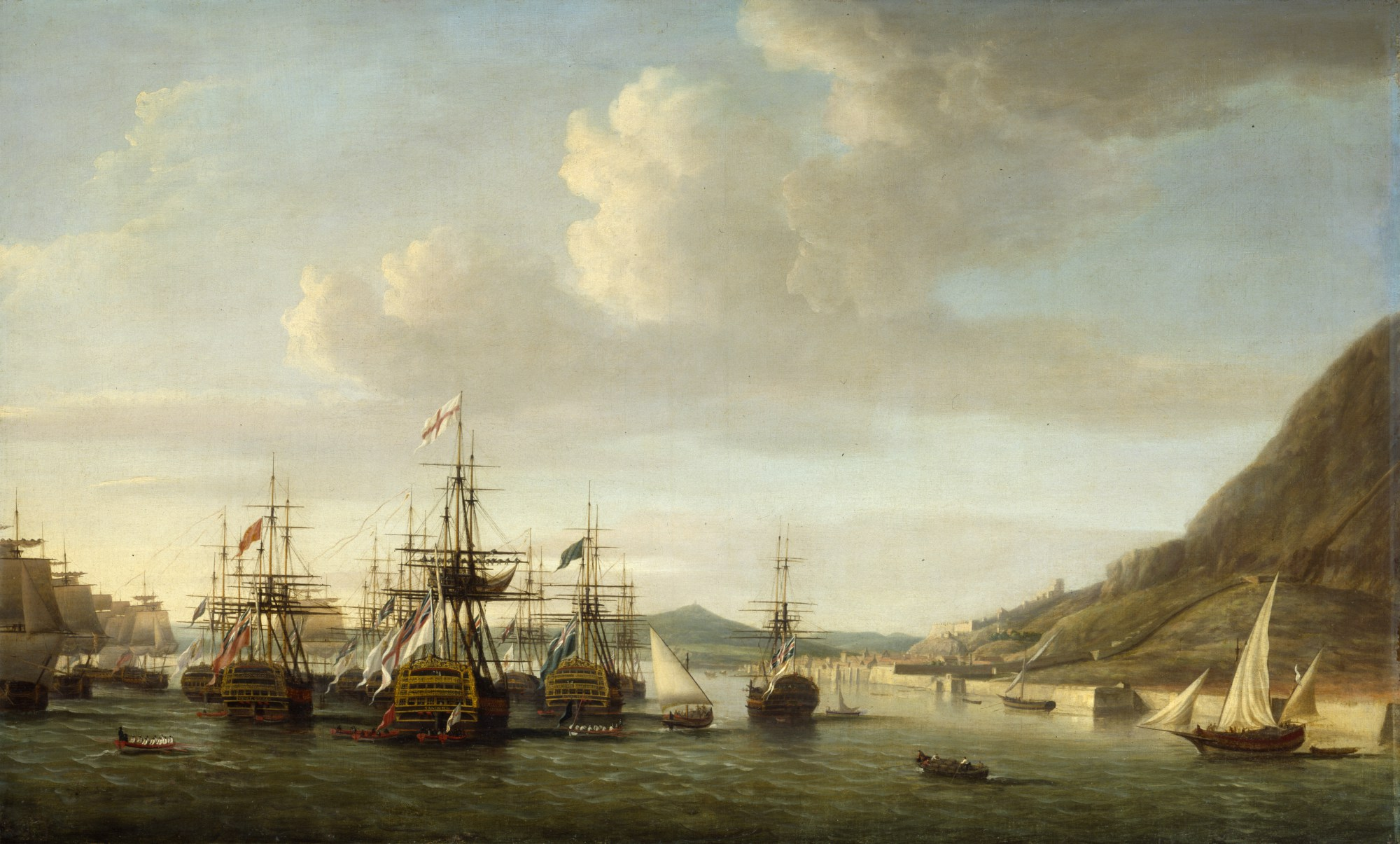
Gibraltar Relieved By Sir George Rodney by Dominic Serres. Rodney's relief fleet at Gibraltar, fresh from the battle off Cape St. Vincent, with several Spanish prizes (including the Fenix). The prizes fly white ensigns with a wheel-type design, probably intended to represent the Spanish ensign.

Around 23:00, the 70-gun San Eugenio surrendered after having all of her masts shot away by the 74-gun HMS Cumberland while HMS Culloden of 74 guns and Prince George, engaged the 70-gun San Julián and compelled her to surrender around 01:00 the next day. The last ship to surrender was the 68-gun Monarca. After shooting away the topmast of the 74-gun HMS Alcide, she engaged in a running battle with the frigate HMS Apollo and struck when Rodney's flagship, the 98-gun HMS Sandwich, came upon the scene around 02:00. San Eugenio and San Julián were blown ashore and lost, but the other four were taken into the Royal Navy. Four other Spanish vessels escaped from the action.

== British service ==
Fénix was commissioned under Captain John Carter Allen in February 1780 and renamed HMS Gibraltar on 23 April. She joined George Darby's fleet in the English Channel until 29 November, when she left for Samuel Hood's squadron in the West Indies under Captain Walter Stirling. In 1781, under Captain Charles Knatchbull, Gibraltar became the flagship of Rear-Admiral Francis Samuel Drake and was present at the Capture of St Eustatius in February. Following the outbreak of war between the Dutch Republic and Britain in December 1780, Rodney received orders from London to seize the island. A British expedition of 3,000 troops from St Lucia, under the command of Lieutenant-General Sir John Vaughan, arrived off St Eustatius on 3 February 1781. Rodney, in command of the naval forces, positioned his fleet so as to neutralise any shore batteries, but instead of disembarking the troops and launching an immediate assault, Rodney sent a message to Governor Johannes de Graaff suggesting that he surrender to avoid bloodshed. De Graaff agreed to the proposal and capitulated. The only shots fired were from Gibraltar and Prince William, both of which, without orders, briefly engaged Mars, the only Dutch warship in the roadstead.

=== Blockade of Martinique ===
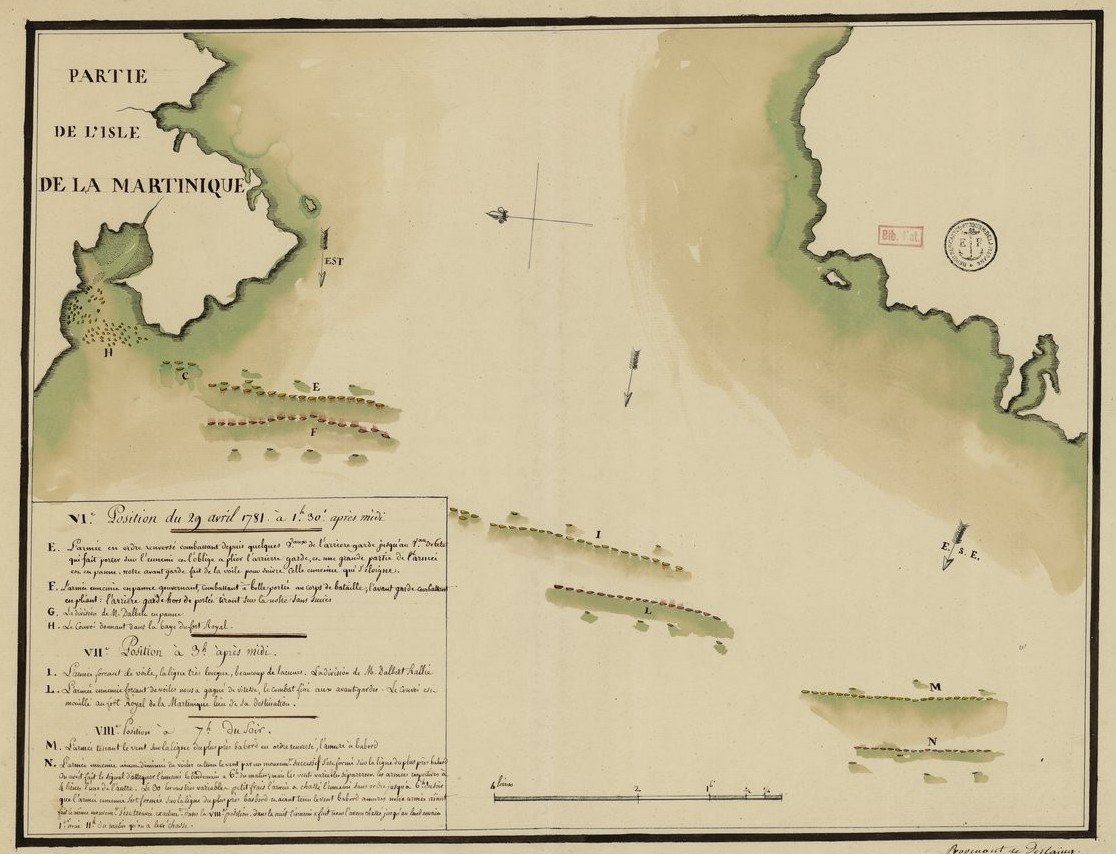
French map showing the position of the two fleets off Martinique, at 12:30, 15:00, and 19:00

Gibraltar was part of a 17-ship squadron, keeping four French ships-of-the-line in Fort Royal, Martinique, when on 29 April 1781 a 20-ship fleet and a merchant convoy under Contre-amiral François de Grasse arrived from Brest. Out of sight of the British, de Grasse put a man ashore to swap information with Fort Royal's garrison, and agree on a plan of attack with the blockaded ships.

De Grasse ordered his fleet to prepare for action, and on the morning of April 29 sailed for Fort Royal with the convoy ships hugging the coast and the armed ships in battle line. Hood's fleet was seen bearing toward them around 08:00 but de Grasse held the weather gauge. At about 09:20, Hood was joined by Prince William, a 64-gun ship that had been at St. Lucia. The two fleets continued to push for advantageous positions. Hood's leeward position prevented de Grasse from bringing the convoy to the harbour, but the four previously blockaded French ships were able to sail out and strengthen de Grasse's position. Gibraltar, as Drake's flagship, led the British rear division.

Around 11:00, the French van began firing at long range, with little effect. By 12:30 the two fleets were aligned, but de Grasse refused to close with Hood, despite Hood's efforts to bring the French to him. The fleets then exchanged cannonades and broadsides at a distance for the next hour. The damage incurred on either side was modest; the four British ships on the southern end of the line suffered the most damage from having been targeted and outnumbered by eight French ships. The 74-gun HMS Russell suffered in particular, and that night Hood sent her to St Eustatius. Arriving on 4 May, her commander was able to brief Rodney about the engagement and French numbers. British casualties amounted to 43 dead and 161 wounded, of which Gibraltar's share was 6 and 16, respectively.

In an attempt to force an action, Hood spent most of the next day struggling to get his ships to windward, but finding two of his fleet too damaged to sail properly, he eventually broke off in a northerly direction. Rodney, who had left St Eustatius earlier that day in Sandwich with the 74-gun Triumph and the hurriedly repaired Russell, met with Hood on 11 May between St Kitts and Antigua. The reunited fleet turned south, putting into Barbados on 18 May.

=== Invasion of St Lucia and Tobago ===
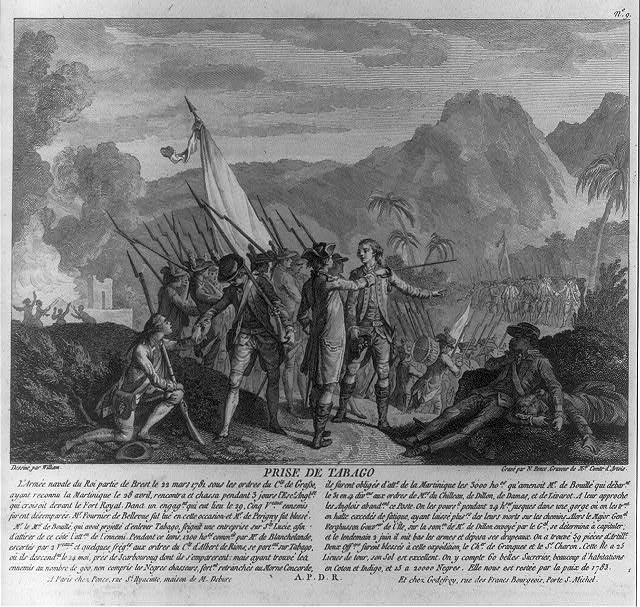
Celebrating the capture of Tobago, French painting from 1784

Hood's withdrawal to Barbados had left St Lucia exposed, and on 10 May, the whole French fleet, less two ships-of-the-line landed 1200 troops at Gros Islet, a village at the northern end of the island. On the same day, the remaining two ships from the French fleet and 1300 troops sailed for Tobago. The British were able to repel the attacks on St Lucia so de Grasse decided to reinforce his attack on Tobago, diverting his fleet there on 25 May and sending 3000 more troops from Martinique.

While at Barbados, Rodney received news of Tobago, and on 29 May dispatched Drake in Gibraltar with five other ships. Drake intercepted the French the following day, but being hopelessly out-numbered retired to Barbados. He arrived on 3 June, and Rodney immediately put to sea with the entire fleet. The British reached Tobago the following day, only to learn it had surrendered two days previously.

Gibraltar carried Rodney back to England in August 1781 and was refitted at Plymouth that October. On completion in January the following year, she was allocated to Captain Thomas Hicks as the flagship of Sir Richard Bickerton. (Note: Winfield's book gives the year as 1781. However, this was a printing error. In addition, it is previously mentioned that in 1781, Gibraltar was under Charles Knatchbull and serving as Francis Samuel Drake's flagship.) In February, she sailed for the East Indies.

=== Cuddalore ===
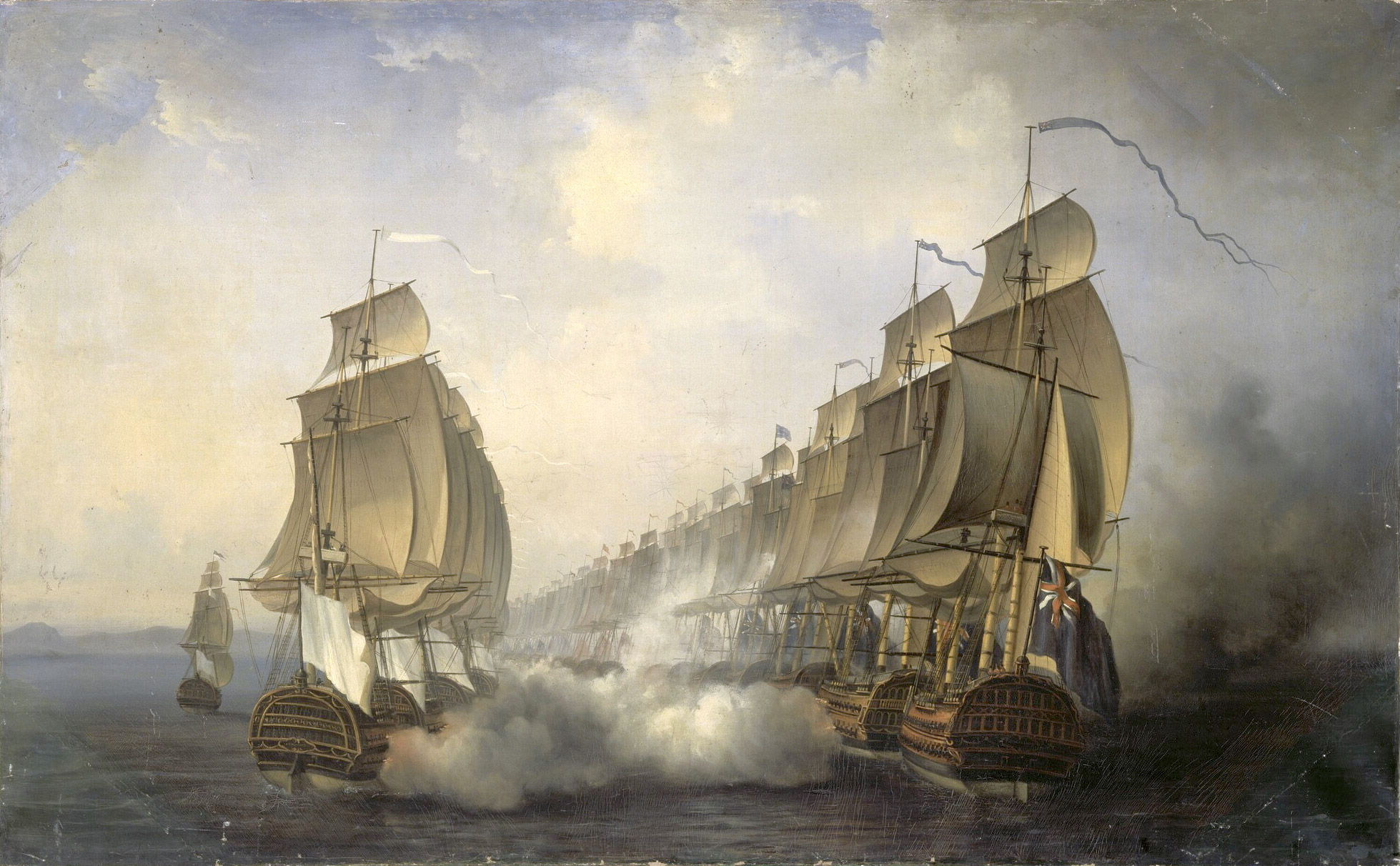
The Battle of Cuddalore by Auguste Jugelet, 1836

Following the death of French ally Hyder Ali in December 1782, British commanders at Madras decided to attempt the recapture of Cuddalore. The army marched south from Madras, circling around the city and then encamping south of it. The British fleet, eighteen ships-of-the-line including Gibraltar, under Admiral Sir Edward Hughes, anchored to the south to protect the army and its supply ships. By early June 1783 the siege of Cuddalore was under way.

French Admiral Pierre André de Suffren with a fleet of fifteen ships sailed from Trincomalee to support the besieged city on 10 June. Arriving on 13 June, the French found the British reluctant to fight, moving away and anchoring some five miles off. As the success of the siege would probably be decided by naval action, 1200 troops were embarked onto Suffren's ships to increase his gunnery complement. Having been frustrated by contrary winds, the French fleet was able to close with the British ships on 17 June. Hughes, not wishing to be caught at anchor, weighed, and the two fleets began manoeuvring for advantage.

Both fleets were at first hampered by light and changeable winds. When a consistent west wind appeared on 20 June, Hughes lined up for battle and awaited Suffren's action. Lining up in a similar formation, Suffren gave the order to attack, and battle began shortly after four in the afternoon. The action lasted around three hours and resulted in no major damage to ships in either fleet, despite all ships being engaged. The British had 99 men killed and 434 wounded; French casualties amounted to 102 killed and 386 wounded.

=== Spanish armament and the outbreak of war ===
Gibraltar returned to England in July 1784, paid off, and in September was laid up in ordinary. Repairs costing £36,713.0.6d were carried out between February 1788 and August 1790. During the Great Spanish Armament, when Spain laid claim to the Nootka Sound, she was brought back into service under Captain Samuel Goodall in May 1790.

France declared war on Britain in February 1793, and Gibraltar was recommissioned under Captain Thomas Mackenzie in May 1793. In September she was refitted at a cost of £17,485 before joining the Channel Fleet under Richard Lord Howe. As part of this fleet, Gibraltar, on 2 May 1794, accompanied the East and West India and Newfoundland convoys along the Channel as far as Lizard Point. Howe then divided his force, sending eight ships-of-the-line and four or five frigates to escort the convoys further. The remaining 26 ships-of-the-line, including Gibraltar, set off to search for a large Franco-American grain convoy known to be heading to France.

Having had two frigates confirm that the French fleet was still at Brest, and realising that it would leave to protect the imminent convoy, Howe attempted an interception in advance by placing his ships where he thought an encounter likely. After thirteen days of searching, the British fleet returned on 19 May, to find the fleet in Brest gone. (Note: The French had in fact passed close by in thick fog, two days previously on 17 May.) On the same day, Howe's fleet fell in with the fifth-rate HMS Venus, which had been attached to Rear-Admiral Sir George Montagu's squadron. Also searching for the convoy, Montagu had been cruising between Cape Ortugal and Belle-Isle, but knowing he would be hopelessly outnumbered, he had sent Venus to locate Howe and ask for reinforcements. At 04:00 the next morning, Howe ordered all sail in an attempt to reach Montagu before the French. A Dutch convoy, bound for Lisbon, had been captured by the French on 19 May and some of these ships were intercepted by the British on 21 May. The crews were able to provide information regarding the whereabouts of the French fleet and Howe set off in pursuit, realising that Montagu was no longer in danger. Not wishing to reduce his numbers by allocating prize crews, Howe ordered the convoy destroyed.

=== First of June ===
The British and French fleets on the morning of 1 June 1794

On 25 May a French ship was seen and followed, which after three days led the British to the main French fleet. Howe gave the order to prepare for battle at 09:45 on 28 May and at 10:35 to form into two columns. In an attempt to force an action, some of the fastest ships were sent to attack the French rear, which they did throughout the day, both causing and receiving some damage. The two fleets came together on 29 May, and a limited engagement took place that petered out and became a general chase after an attempt to cut the French line was mistimed. Thick fog prevented any further action for the next two days.

The weather cleared on the morning of 1 June, and both fleets were drawn up line ahead, sailing in the same direction, Gibraltar in the centre, immediately before Hood's flagship, the first-rate Queen Charlotte and behind the 74-gun Culloden. At around 08:15 the order was given for each ship to bear down upon and engage her opposite number. Gibraltar was one of three ships Howe signalled to put on more sail. The tardiness of Gibraltar and the 74-gun Brunswick, on the other side of Queen Charlotte, meant that Howe found himself battling one 120-gun and two 80-gun ships simultaneously. Gibraltar was, however, able to stop a fourth enemy ship, the first-rate Républicain, from joining in, by bringing down her main and mizzen masts from a distance. By the end of the action, six French ships had been captured and another sunk. The remainder escaped. In the three engagements, it was estimated that French casualties were between 3,000 and 7,000 dead and wounded, while British losses were recorded as 290 dead and 858 wounded. Having been kept to windward for most of the battle, casualties aboard Gibraltar were light: two killed and 12 wounded. After spending two days making repairs, the British fleet sailed for home with its prizes, having failed to stop the grain convoy that arrived in Brest on 12 June.

=== Action of Hyères ===
Gibraltar was sent to the Mediterranean in May 1795 under Captain John Pakenham, who had taken command in August the previous year. Joining Admiral William Hotham's fleet on 14 June, Gibraltar fought in an action off the Hyères Islands in July. The fleet was re-victualling in San Fiorenzo bay on 8 July when a small squadron under Commodore Horatio Nelson approached, followed by the French Fleet from Toulon. The British fleet was not able to put to sea immediately due to contrary winds but was spotted by the French, who abandoned their chase. Hotham finished refitting and supplying his ships, and finally managed to set off after his quarry at 21:00; almost twelve hours later. Following a storm, the British were carrying out repairs when they sighted the French fleet at dawn on 13 July. At 03:45 Hotham gave the order to make all possible sail in pursuit of their enemy, five miles off and heading for Fréjus. The two fleets were close enough to exchange fire at 08:00 when the British van engaged the rearmost French ships, one of which struck after six hours. However, she caught fire and exploded before the British could take possession of her. Just as Gibraltar was joining the action, Hotham signalled to disengage, believing the fleet to be running out of sea-room but being too far back to see that this was not the case. Hotham resigned his position early the following year and was eventually replaced by Admiral John Jervis.

=== Caught in a storm ===
The British fleet was anchored off The Rock on 10 December 1796 when a storm blew up. Culloden was obliged to get under way when her anchors failed to hold, narrowly missing Pearl Rock in the process, and at 21:00, Gibraltar was forced to cut her cable. As she was attempting to get clear of Cabrita Point at 22:00, her fore topmast snapped and her foresail, mainsail, main topmast staysail, and mizzen staysail tore. Having already lost her main topsail, she became difficult to handle and struck the sandbank several times before being blown across it. By midnight Gibraltar was out of danger and able to ride out the storm, and the next day at noon she anchored in Tangier Bay. The damage incurred during the storm necessitated her being sent to Plymouth in January 1797. During the repairs, which took until April and cost £12,818, a large piece of rock was removed from her hull. Gibraltar returned to the Mediterranean in July 1797 under Captain William Hancock Kelly.

=== Bruix' expedition ===
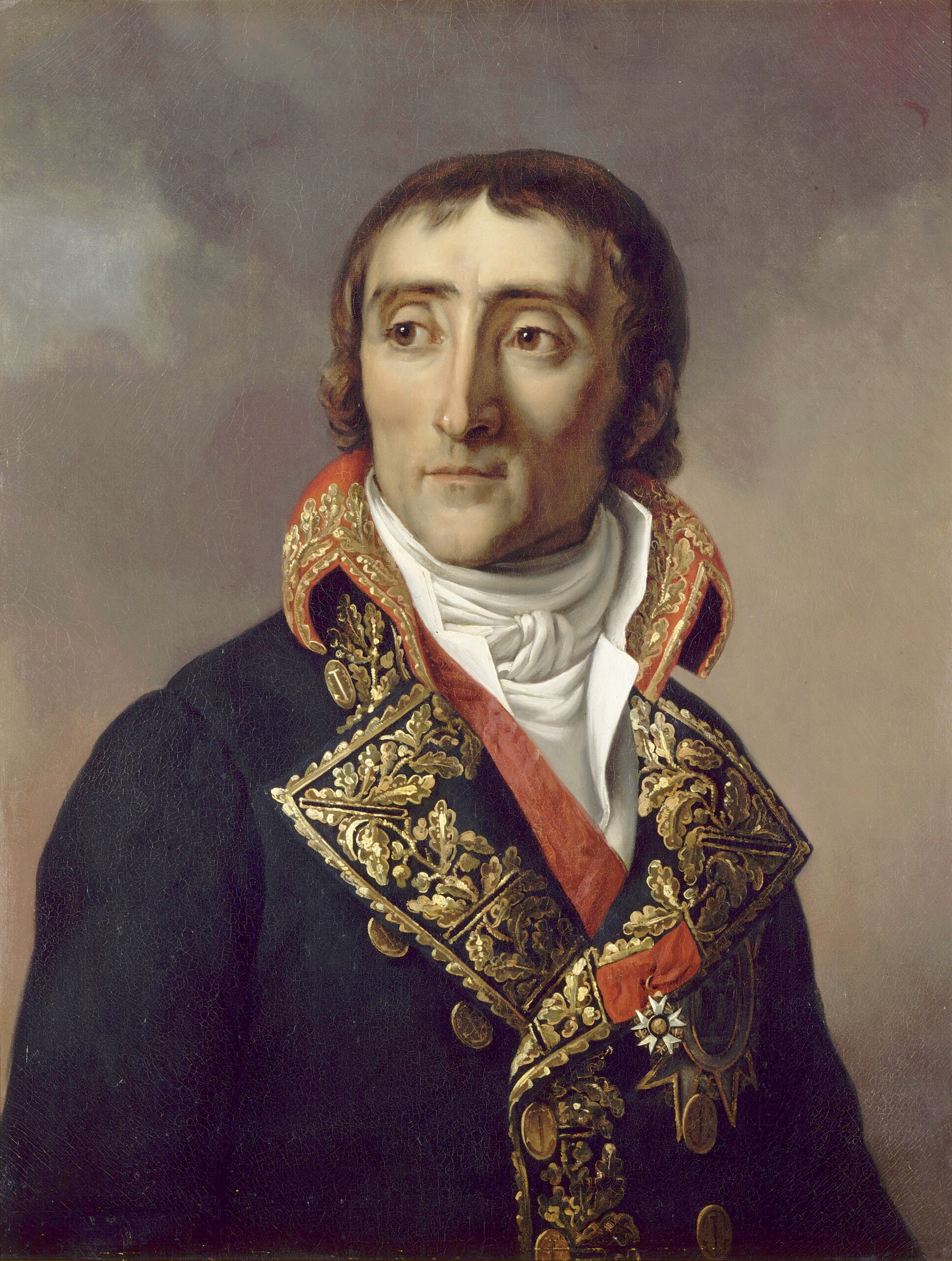
1837 portrait of Étienne Eustache Bruix by Jean-Baptiste Paulin Guérin

In May 1799 Gibraltar was one of fifteen ships of the line in a British fleet commanded by George Elphinstone which had been blockading the port of Cádiz since the beginning of the year. (Note: The blockaded Spanish fleet comprised 19 ships-of-the-line but only 17 were capable of going to sea at that particular time.) On hearing from the British frigate HMS Success that the French fleet had broken out of Brest and was on its way, Elphinstone immediately had all ships prepare for action, and dispatched the brig-sloop HMS Childers to warn Jervis at Gibraltar. The French fleet under Vice-Admiral Étienne Eustache Bruix, which had escaped on 25 April, comprised 25 ships of the line and had already evaded Hood's Channel Fleet, when it appeared fifteen miles off Cádiz on 4 May.

Bruix's orders were to combine the French and Spanish fleets and rescue Napoleon's army, stranded in Egypt following the Battle of the Nile, but the ships in Cádiz were prevented from joining their French allies by an opposing wind, and although the British offered their line of battle, it was declined and the Brest fleet instead stood out for the Strait of Gibraltar. Elphinstone followed as far as Cape Spartel before first returning to check on the fleet in Cádiz, then sailing to join Jervis at Gibraltar, arriving at 09:00 on 10 May. Elphinstone made several further attempts to track down and bring the French to action, without success. Bruix was able to amass a powerful fleet of 59 ships but failed to achieve his ultimate goal and returned to Brest on 8 August.

In January 1801, a British expeditionary force of 16,000 troops and more than 100 vessels was assembled in Malta in preparation for an invasion of French-occupied Egypt. Elphinstone's fleet, to which Gibraltar was attached, escorted the force to Aboukir Bay, arriving on 1 February 1801. Bad weather prevented the army, under Sir Ralph Abercromby, from landing for a week, and lack of water prevented Gibraltar and the larger ships from giving covering fire during the debarkation; nevertheless, the campaign was brought to a successful conclusion when the French surrendered on 2 September at Alexandria following a long siege. In 1850 a medal with the clasp "Egypt" was retrospectively awarded to the surviving members of Gibraltar's crew for their part in the campaign.

=== Ganteaume's expeditions ===
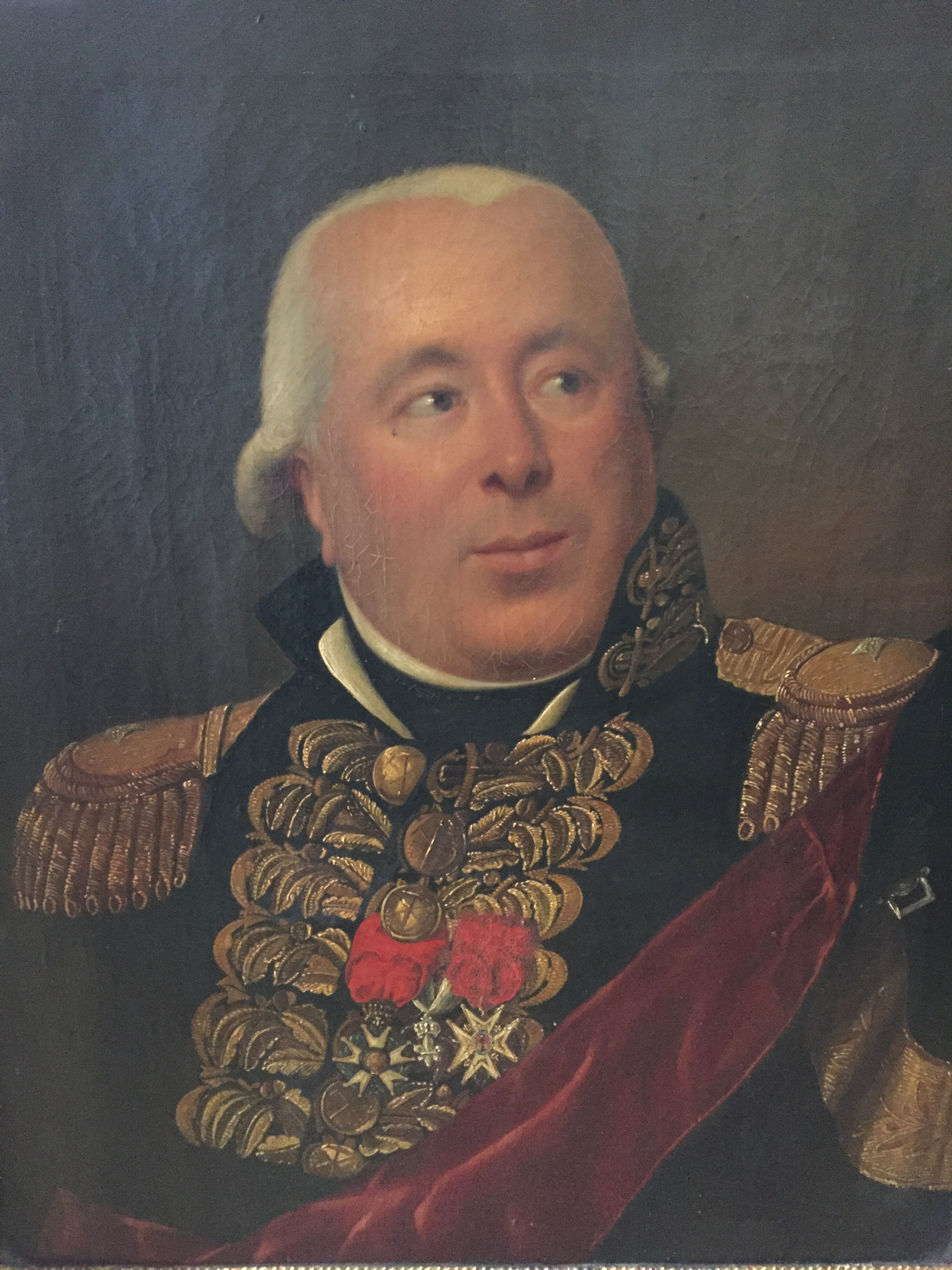
Portrait of Honoré Joseph Antoine Ganteaume

In March 1801 Gibraltar took part in the pursuit of Contre-amiral Honoré Ganteaume, whose squadron had made a further attempt to reinforce the French troops in Egypt. Having sailed from Brest on 7 January, the French force of three 80-gun and four 74-gun ships-of-the-line, plus two frigates, passed into the Mediterranean on 9 February, where it captured the only British ship in the area, the 32-gun frigate, Success. Rear-admiral Sir John Borlase Warren's squadron, comprising Gibraltar, the seventy-fours Renown, Dragon, Généreux, Hector, and the 64-gun Haerlem, on hearing of the event, set off in pursuit. Forced into Mahón on 27 February by a storm, the squadron remained there for several days while repairs were undertaken. The search continued on 4 March, minus Généreux, which was left to defend the island in the event of a surprise attack by French and Spanish forces. After Warren's squadron had visited Naples and Palermo, it received reinforcements on 18 and 22 March in the form of the 64-gun Athénien and the 74-gun Alexander, respectively. Now, with seven ships-of-the-line, Warren turned towards Toulon, hoping to find Ganteaume there.

At dawn on 25 March, while crossing the Tyrrhenian Sea, the French squadron was spotted, having been reduced to ten ships by a storm the previous night. Ganteaume turned his ships to the south-east and Warren gave chase. Gibraltar and Athenienne began to lag behind, and Warren, fearing his force would become fragmented, ordered his faster ships to slow down. The French were thus able to escape into the night, the British continuing on a south-east course while they quietly turned north, back to Toulon.

=== Elba ===
Warren's squadron was called upon to relieve the British garrison at Porto Ferrajo, which had been under siege since the beginning of May 1801. The arrival of the British ships on 1 August caused the two French frigates blockading the port to retreat to Leghorn. These two frigates, Bravoure and the recently captured Succès, were later brought to action on 2 September by the British frigates Pomone, Phoenix, and Minerve. Succès was recaptured, and Bravoure was destroyed after she had run aground. (Note: Succès was previously HMS Success, captured off Gibraltar by Ganteaume's force on 9 February 1801.)

Warren's squadron, which included Gibraltar, supplied nearly 700 seamen and marines for an attack on the French batteries investing the town. The action took place on 14 September but was only partially successful, and eight days later the British ships left Elba. Porto Ferrajo itself remained in British hands until the end of the war. (Note: Warren's squadron at the time comprised: Renown, Gibraltar, Dragon, Alexander, Généreux, Stately, of the line, Pomone, and Pearl frigates, and the brig-sloop Vincejo.)

=== Conflict renewed ===
During the Peace of Amiens, a short-lived mutiny took place aboard Gibraltar. The officers and marines were quickly able to regain control, however, and the instigators were hanged. When Britain declared war on France in May 1803, Gibraltar, commanded by Captain George Frederick Ryves, was one of only ten British ships in the Mediterranean. Under Sir Richard Bickerton, the squadron was stationed off Naples before sailing for Toulon on 4 June. Overall command passed to Horatio Nelson when he arrived in the frigate HMS Amphion on 8 July, and when Thomas Masterman Hardy joined in the first-rate HMS Victory on 30 July, Nelson immediately moved his flag to her.

By 1804 the British fleet in the Mediterranean had been reinforced and Gibraltar was paid off in July. She was refitted in Portsmouth in July 1805 at a cost of £30,643 and re-classed as a second-rate. She returned to the Mediterranean at the end of the year under Captain Mark Robinson, command later passing to Captain William Lukin.

Gibraltar and two 36-gun frigates, HMS Penelope and HMS Tribune, spotted the 74-gun Vétéran off Belleisle, on 26 August 1806. Commanded by Jérôme Bonaparte, youngest brother of Napoleon, Vétéran was returning from the Bahamas. The British ships gave chase, but Vétéran outran them and found a safe anchorage in Baie de La Forêt, Brittany.

=== Basque Roads ===
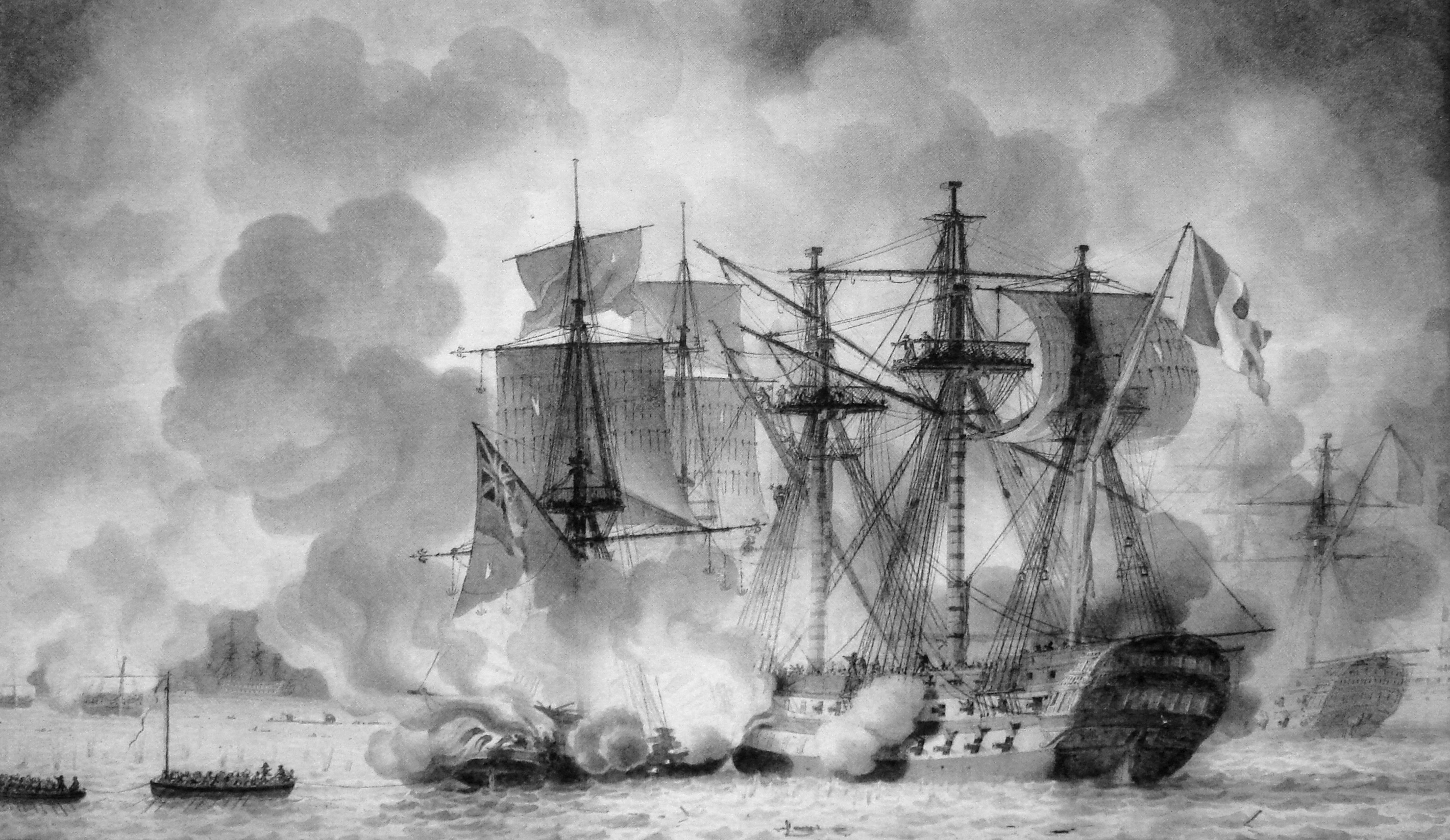
The French Régulus under attack by British fireships during the evening of 11 April 1809. Portrayed by Louis-Philippe Crépin.

When Captain John Halliday assumed command of Gibraltar in April 1807, she was serving in the Channel, part of a fleet under Admiral James Gambier. On 17 March 1809 this fleet joined with Robert Stoppard's squadron, which was blockading the French fleet in the Basque Roads. Halliday was superseded at the beginning of April by Henry Lidgbird Ball, who was Gibraltar's captain at the Battle of Basque Roads.

The French ships had been anchored under the protection of the powerful batteries on the Isle d'Aix when on 11 April, Lord Cochrane attacked them with fireships and explosive vessels. Gibraltar's crew and officers helped man the fireships, which were limited in the damage they caused by a boom placed across the channel. This was breached by one of the explosive vessels, however, and the French panicked, slipped their anchors, and drifted onto the shore. Gibraltar's Lieutenant John Cookesley, who commanded one of the fireships, and Master's mate John Conyer were both badly burnt during the operation.

Gambier's fleet spent the next two weeks attempting to capture or destroy the stranded French vessels, with some success. The attack came to an end on 29 April when the last French ship was re-floated and taken up the river to safety at Rochefort.

Command of Gibraltar passed to Valentine Collard in June 1809, then Robert Plampin in 1810 when she returned to service in the Channel. Gibraltar's last commander was Captain George Scott, who took over in January 1812.

== Fate ==
Gibraltar was paid off some time in 1813 and laid up in ordinary at Plymouth. Towards the end of the year, she was converted to a powder hulk. She was moved to Milford Haven in September 1824 where she was used as a lazarette, then broken up in November 1836 at Pembroke Dock. Some of her timbers (of South American cedar) were used to make the partitions and doors of the cabins of HMS Gorgon (1837), which was being built at Pembroke at the time.
