= Gibraltar Relieved by Sir George Rodney =

Painting by Dominic Serres

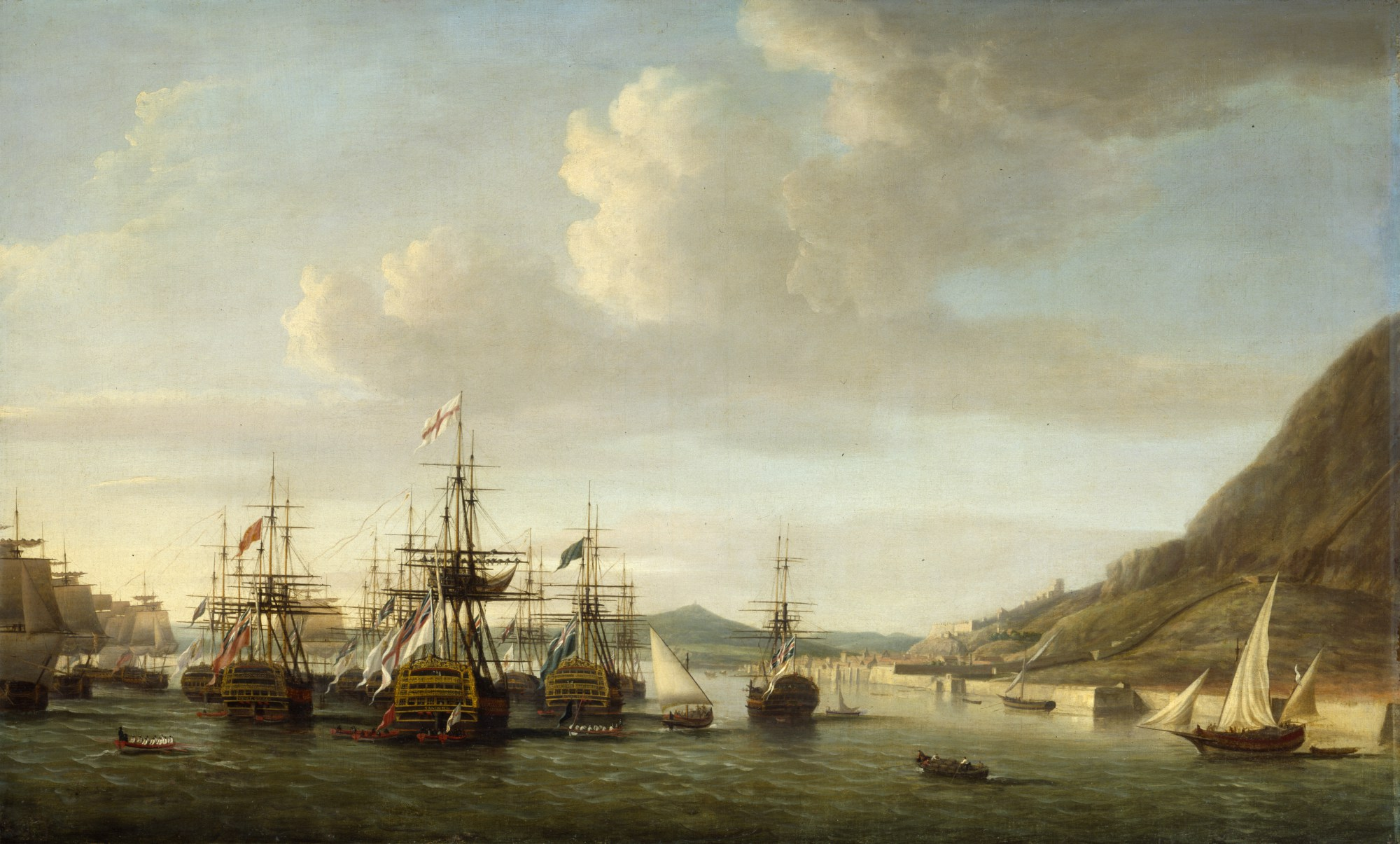
- Artist: Dominic Serres
- Year: 1782
- Type: Oil on canvas, history painting
- Dimensions: 88.5 cm × 145 cm (34.8 in × 57 in)
- Location: Royal Academy of Arts, London

Gibraltar Relieved By Sir George Rodney is an oil on canvas history painting by the French-born British artist Dominic Serres, from 1782.

== History and description ==
It portrays a scene from the Great Siege of Gibraltar in January 1780 during American War of Independence. Having defeated a Spanish fleet at the Battle of Cape St. Vincent (painted by Serres as The Moonlight Battle) the British Admiral Rodney escorted a relief and resupply effort to the garrison. This was a major boost to the defence of the British stronghold, which defeated all efforts to capture it by French and Spanish forces between 1779 and 1783. Visible in the painting is Rodney's flagship Sandwich as well as the Fenix, the flagship of Spanish admiral Juan de Lángara which was captured at Cape St. Vincent.

Serres was a founded member of the Royal Academy of Arts and specialised in marine painting, particularly scenes of the Seven Years' War and American War of Independence. He was appointed Marine Painter to George III in 1780. He donated the work to the Royal Academy in 1782 as a diploma piece and it remains in the collection. A version of the painting in watercolour by Serres is held by the Whitworth Art Gallery.

== Bibliography ==
- Allison, David K. & Ferreiro, Larrie D. The American Revolution: A World War. Smithsonian Institution, 2018.
- Nugent, Charles. British Watercolours: A Summary Catalogue of the Whitworth Art Gallery. Bloomsbury, 2003.
- Russett, Alan. Dominic Serres, R.A., 1719–1793: War Artist to the Navy. Antique Collectors' Club, 2001.
