= Sandwich-class ship of the line =

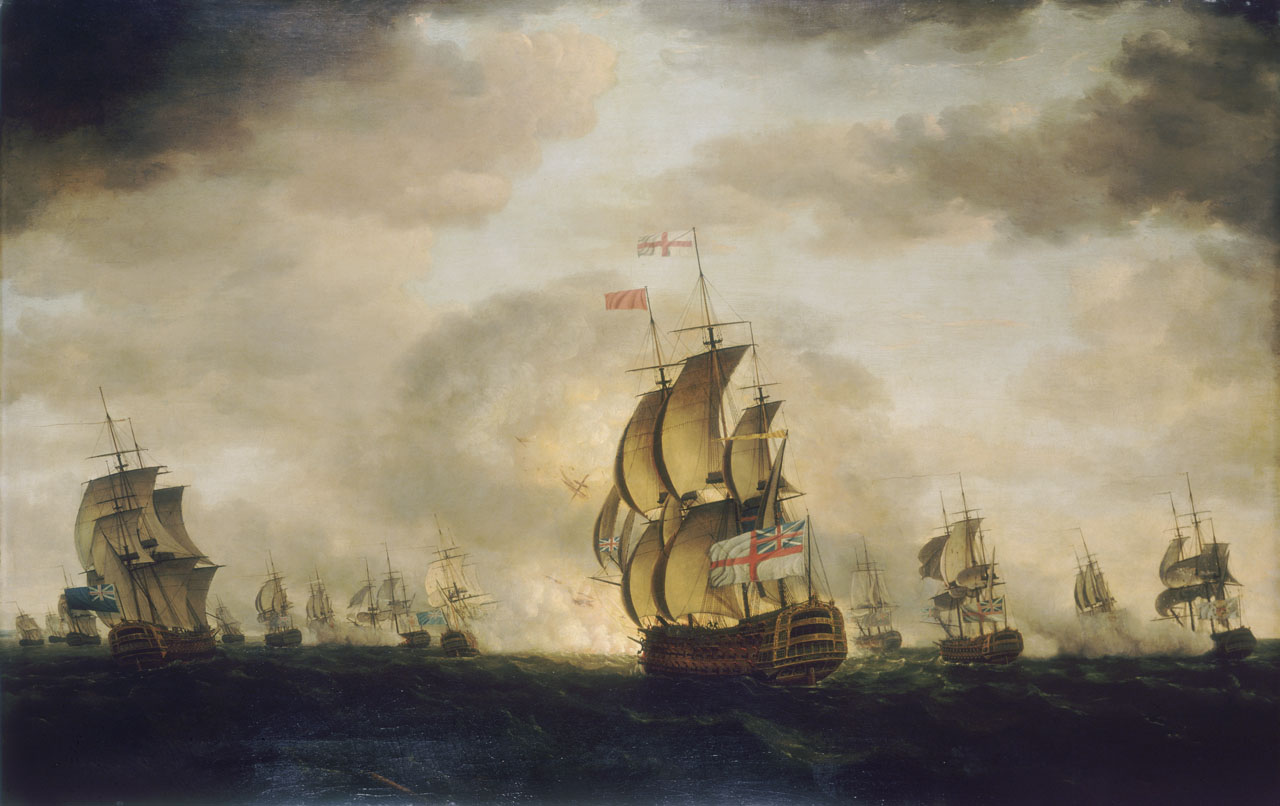
- The moonlight Battle off Cape St Vincent, 16 January 1780 by Francis Holman, painted 1780 shows the Santo Domingo exploding, with Rodney's flagship Sandwich in the foreground.

Class overview
- Name: Sandwich
- Operators: Royal Navy
- Preceded by: 1745 Establishment
- Succeeded by: London class
- In service: 14 April 1759 – 1810
- Completed: 3
- Lost: 1

General characteristics
- Type: Ship of the line
- Length: 176 ft (53.6 m) (gundeck); 142 ft 7½ in (43.5 m) (keel)
- Beam: 49 ft (14.9 m)
- Propulsion: Sails
- Armament: 90 guns: Gundeck: 28 × 32 pdrs; Middle gundeck: 30 × 18 pdrs; Upper gundeck: 30 × 12 pdrs; Forecastle: 2 × 9 pdrs
- Notes: Ships in class include: Sandwich, Ocean, Blenheim

The Sandwich class ships of the line were a class of three 90-gun second rates, designed for the Royal Navy by Sir Thomas Slade.

== Ships ==
- HMS Sandwich

Builder: Chatham Dockyard
Ordered: 22 November 1755
Launched: 14 April 1759
Fate: Broken up, 1810

- HMS Ocean

Builder: Chatham Dockyard
Ordered: 22 April 1758
Launched: 21 April 1761
Fate: Sold out of the service, 1793

- HMS Blenheim

Builder: Woolwich Dockyard
Ordered: 12 November 1755
Launched: 5 July 1761
Fate: Wrecked, 1807
