= Battle of the Gulf of Roses =

Battle of the War of the First Coalition

- Part of the War of the Pyrenees
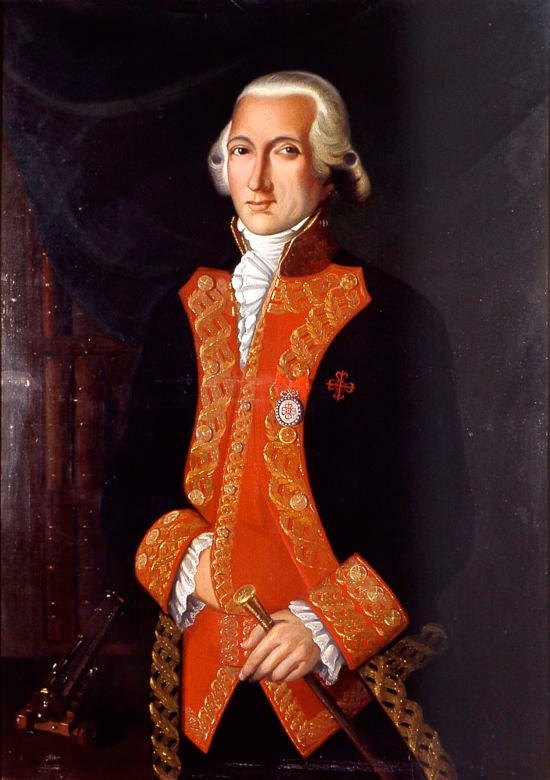
- Portrait of Juan de Lángara
Date	14 February 1795
Location	Off the Gulf of Roses, Mediterranean Sea 42°11′N 3°11′E
Result	Spanish victory

Belligerents
Spain	France

Commanders and leaders
Juan de Lángara	Captain Guet (surrendered)

Strength
1 ship of the line	1 frigate

Casualties and losses
Minor	280 killed or wounded 1 frigate captured
- Location within Spain Battle of the Gulf of Roses (France) Battle of the Gulf of Roses (Mediterranean)

The Battle of the Gulf of Roses, also known as the action of 14 February 1795, was a minor naval engagement of the French Revolutionary Wars. It was fought in the Gulf of Roses between a ship of Juan de Lángara's fleet and a French squadron which consisted of a frigate and a corvette. Upon Lángara's orders, the 112-gun Spanish ship of the line Reina María Luisa pursued the French frigate Iphigenie for over 24 hours, ultimately forcing the Iphigenie to strike its colors. The French corvette, which had been separated from the fleet three days earlier in a storm, was assumed to be lost.

Several days later on March 30, 1795, the 74-gun Spanish ship Montañés, which was escorting the captured Iphigenie, was attacked by a strong French squadron. Consisting of eight ships of the line and two frigates, the French squadron initially flew the Spanish flag. However, due to its superior speed, the Montañés was able to reach the port of Sant Feliu de Guíxols. After a fierce battle in which the Montañés fired 1,100 cannonballs, the attacking French forces were repelled. The only losses aboard the Montañés were three men killed, with several others wounded. The French subsequently withdrew to Menorca.
