= Battle of Cape St. Vincent (1780) =

1780 battle of the American Revolutionary War

- Part of the American Revolutionary War
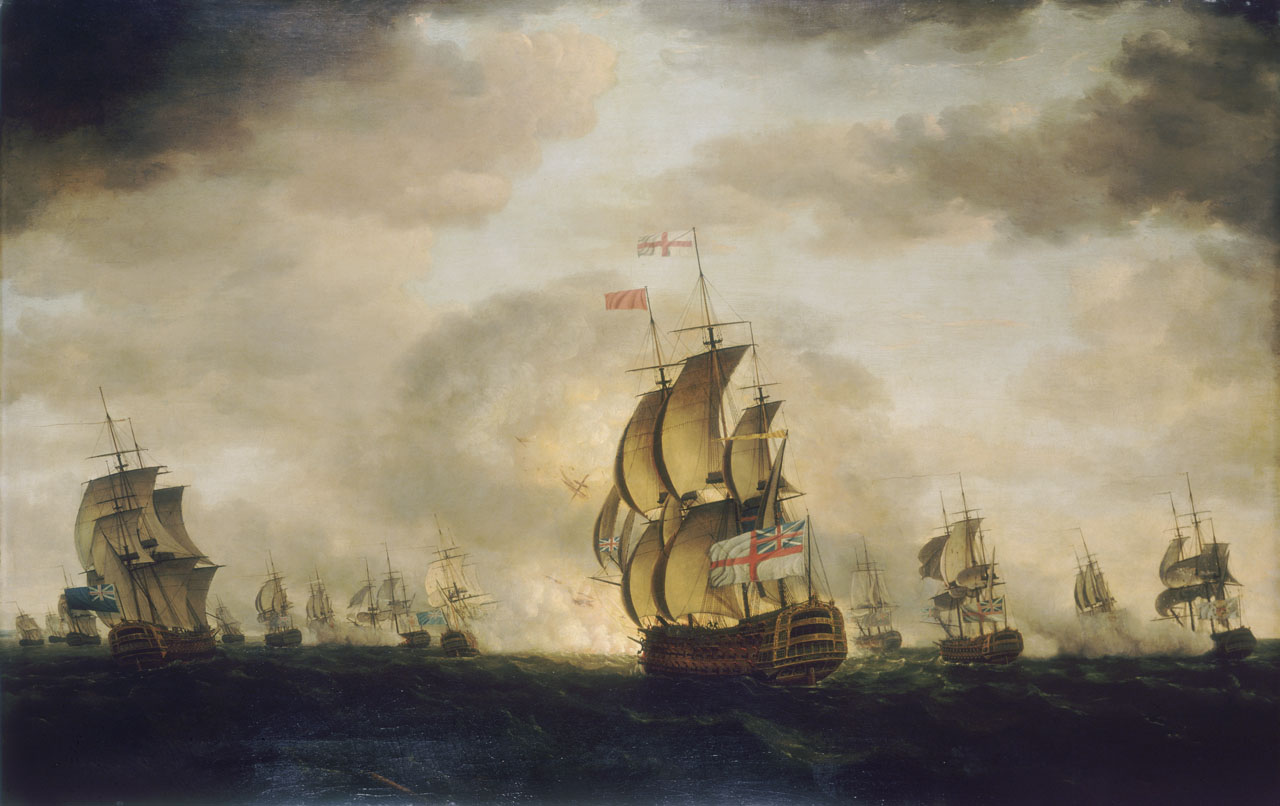
- 1780 painting of the battle by Francis Holman
Date	16–17 January 1780
Location	Off Cape St. Vincent, Atlantic Ocean 36°49′5″N 8°33′49″W
Result	British victory

Belligerents
Great Britain	Spain

Commanders and leaders
Sir George Rodney	Juan de Lángara (POW)

Strength
18 ships of the line 3 frigates 3 post ships	11 ships of the line 2 frigates

Casualties and losses
32 killed 102 wounded	2,500 killed, wounded or captured 4 ships of the line captured 1 ship of the line destroyed 1 ship of the line wrecked

The Battle of Cape St. Vincent (Spanish: Batalla del Cabo de San Vicente) was a fleet action fought off Cape St. Vincent on 16–17 January 1780 during the American Revolutionary War. A Royal Navy fleet under Admiral of the White Sir George Rodney defeated a smaller Spanish Navy fleet under Squadron Commander Juan de Lángara in what became known as the Moonlight Battle (batalla a la luz de la luna), unusual since the Age of Sail saw almost exclusively daytime battles. It was the first major British naval victory of the war, and proved the maneuvering value of copper sheathed hulls.

On 21 June 1779 Spain had joined its ally France, which was allied with the United States, in their war with Britain. Rodney was escorting a supply convoy with a powerful fleet of 18 ships of the line to relieve the Spanish siege of Gibraltar, when he encountered Lángara's fleet south of Cape St. Vincent on 16 January 1780. When Lángara saw the size of the British fleet, he rushed toward the safety of Cádiz, but the copper-sheathed British ships chased him down. In a running battle that lasted from mid-afternoon until after midnight, the British captured four ships of the line, including Lángara's flagship Fénix.

Two other Spanish ships of the line were also captured but then retaken by their crews. Although Rodney's after action report claimed both ships were grounded and wrecked, one safely returned to Cádiz and resumed service. Following the battle, Rodney successfully resupplied Gibraltar and Minorca before continuing on to the British West Indies. Lángara was released on parole; his career did not suffer from the defeat, and he was promoted to lieutenant general by Charles III of Spain.

== Background ==
One of Spain's principal goals upon its entry into the American War of Independence in 1779 was the recovery of Gibraltar, which had been lost to Great Britain in 1704. The Spanish planned to retake Gibraltar by blockading and starving out its garrison of British and Hanoverian troops. The siege formally began in June 1779 with a land blockade around the Rock of Gibraltar. The matching naval blockade was comparatively weak, however, and the British discovered that ships which were and small fast enough could evade the blockaders. By late 1779, however, supplies in Gibraltar had become seriously depleted, and its commander, General George Eliott, appealed to London for relief. In late December 1779 a large supply convoy and protecting fleet sailed from England under the command of Admiral of the White Sir George Rodney. Rodney's ultimate mission was to join the West Indies fleet, but he had secret instructions to first resupply Gibraltar and Minorca. On 4 January 1780 the fleet divided, with ships headed for the West Indies sailing westward. This left Rodney in command of 19 ships of the line, which were to accompany the supply ships to Gibraltar.

Map of the Iberian Peninsula

On 8 January 1780 ships from Rodney's fleet spotted a group of sails. Giving chase with their faster copper-clad ships, the British determined these to be a Spanish supply convoy protected by a single ship of the line and several frigates. The entire convoy was captured, with the lone ship of the line Guipuzcoana striking her colours after a perfunctory exchange of fire. Guipuzcoana was staffed with a small prize crew and renamed HMS Prince William, in honour of third son of the King, then serving as a midshipman with the fleet. Rodney detached HMS America and the frigate HMS Pearl to escort most of the captured ships back to England; Prince William was added to his fleet, as well as some of the Spanish supply ships rerouted to the Gibraltar garrison.

On 12 January HMS Dublin, which had lost part of her topmast on 3 January, suffered additional damage and raised a distress flag. Assisted by HMS Shrewsbury, she limped into the neutral port of Lisbon on 16 January. News of the British fleet had come to the Spanish command. Drawn from the blockading force, a fleet of 11 ships of the line under Squadron Commander Juan de Lángara was dispatched to intercept Rodney's convoy. The Atlantic fleet of Admiral Luis de Córdova y Córdova at Cádiz was also alerted to try to catch him, but after learning the strength of Rodney's fleet, Córdova withdrew to Cádiz. On 16 January the fleets of Lángara and Rodney spotted each other around 1:00 pm south of Cape St. Vincent, the southwestern point of Portugal and the Iberian Peninsula. The weather was hazy, with heavy swells and occasional squalls.

== Battle ==
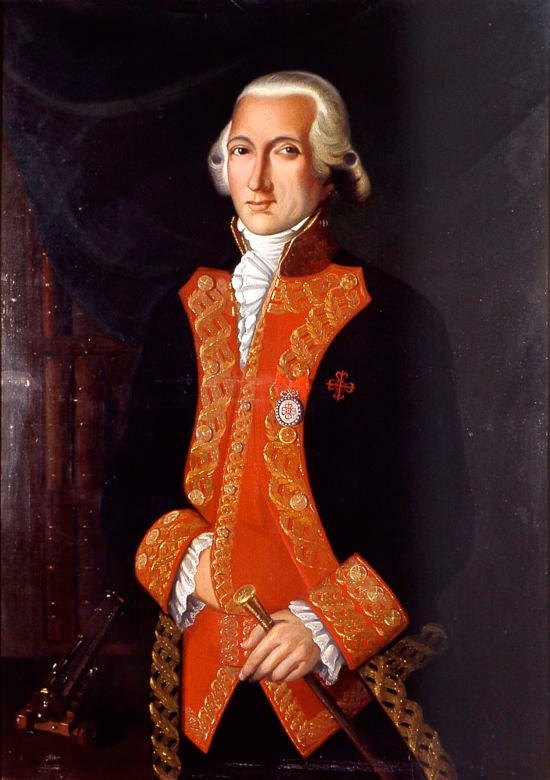
Portrait of Lángara

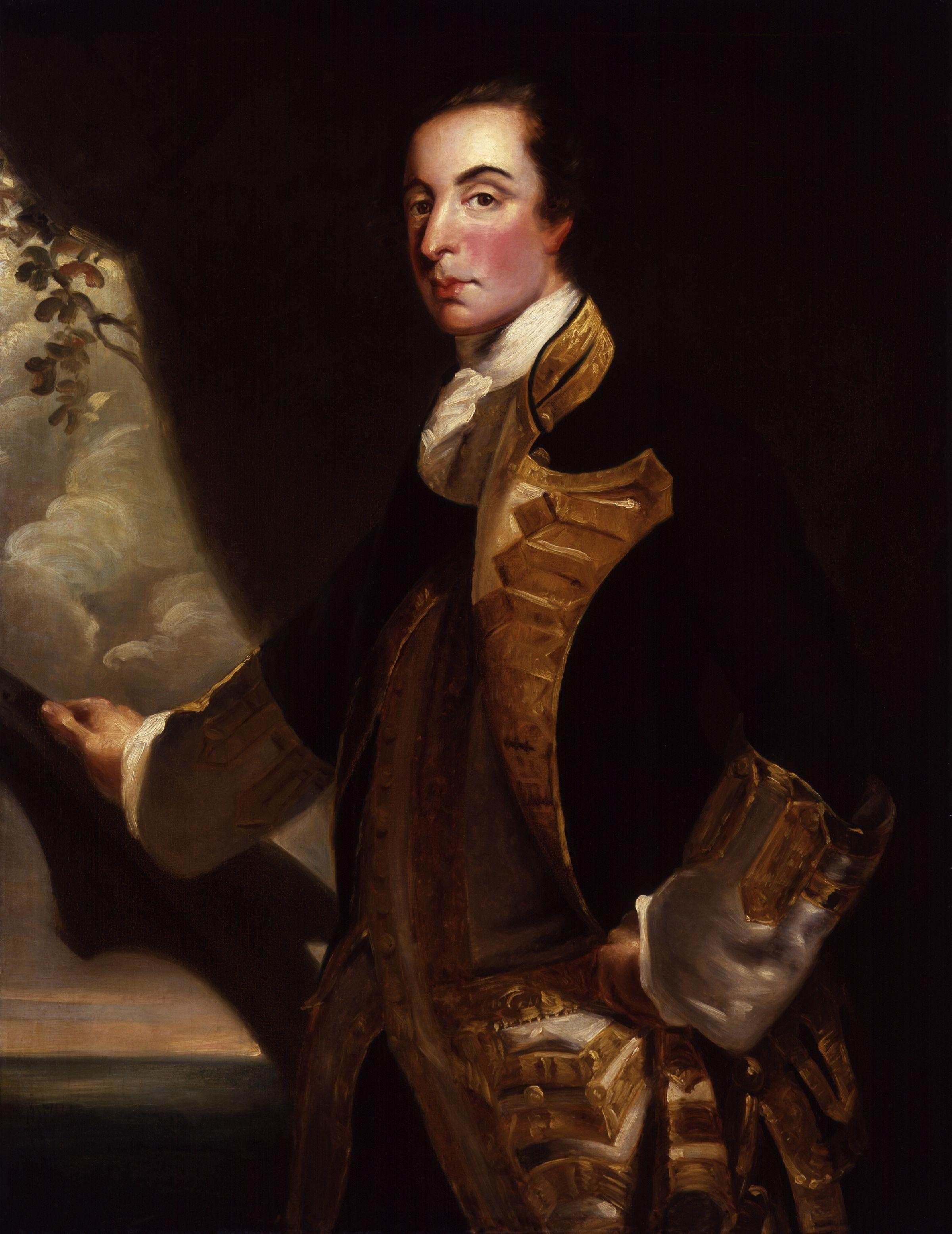
Portrait of Rodney by Sir Joshua Reynolds

Rodney was ill, and spent the entire action in his bunk. His flag captain, Walter Young, urged Rodney to give orders to engage when the Spanish fleet was first spotted, but Rodney only gave orders to form a line abreast. Lángara started to establish a line of battle, but when he realised the size of Rodney's fleet, he gave orders to make all sail for Cádiz. Around 2:00 pm, when Rodney felt certain that the ships seen were not the vanguard of a larger Spanish fleet, he ordered a general chase at top speed, and engage the Spanish ships from the rear as they came upon them. They were also instructed to sail to the lee side to interfere with Spanish toward shore, a tactic that also prevented the Spanish ships from opening their lowest gun ports. Because their copper-sheathed hulls reduced barnacles and drag, the British ships were faster and steadily gained on the Spanish.

The chase lasted for about two hours, and the battle finally began around 4:00 pm. Santo Domingo, trailing in the Spanish fleet, received broadsides from HMS Edgar, HMS Marlborough, and HMS Ajax before blowing up around 4:40, with the loss of all but one of her crew. Marlborough and Ajax then passed Princesa to engage other Spanish ships. Princesa was eventually engaged in an hour-long battle with HMS Bedford before striking her colours at about 5:30. By 6:00 pm it was getting dark, and there was a discussion aboard HMS Sandwich, Rodney's flagship, about whether to continue the pursuit. Although Captain Young is credited in some accounts with pushing Rodney to do so, the fleet physician Gilbert Blane reported it as a decision of the council.

The chase continued into the dark, squally night, leading to it later being known as the "Moonlight Battle", since it was uncommon at the time for naval battles to continue after sunset. At 7:30 pm, HMS Defence came upon Lángara's flagship Fénix, engaging her for over an hour. HMS Montagu and HMS Prince George broadsided Fénix in passing, and Lángara was wounded. Fénix finally struck her colours to HMS Bienfaisant, which arrived late in the battle and shot away her mainmast. Fénix's takeover was complicated by an outbreak of smallpox aboard Bienfaisant. Captain John MacBride, rather than sending over a possibly infected prize crew, apprised Lángara of the situation and put him and his crew on parole. At 9:15 Montagu engaged Diligente, which struck colors after her maintopmast was shot away. Around 11:00 pm San Eugenio surrendered after having all of her masts shot away by HMS Cumberland, but the difficult seas made it impossible to board a prize crew until morning. The San Eugenio duel was passed by HMS Culloden and Prince George, which engaged San Julián and compelled her crew to strike colours around 1:00 am. The last ship to surrender was Monarca. She nearly escaped, shooting away HMS Alcide's topmast, but was engaged in a running battle with the much smaller frigate HMS Apollo, which managed to keep up the fight for an hour. Rodney's flagship Sandwich came upon the scene around 2:00 am and fired a broadside, unaware that Monarca had already hauled down her flag.

The British took six ships. Four Spanish ships of the line and the two frigates escaped, although sources are unclear if two of these ships were even present at the time of the battle. Lángara's report states that San Justo and San Genaro were not in his line of battle, though they were listed as part of his fleet. By one account, Lángara had dispatched these two ship to investigate other unidentified sails sometime before the action. Rodney's report states that San Justo escaped but was damaged in battle, and that San Genaro escaped without damage.

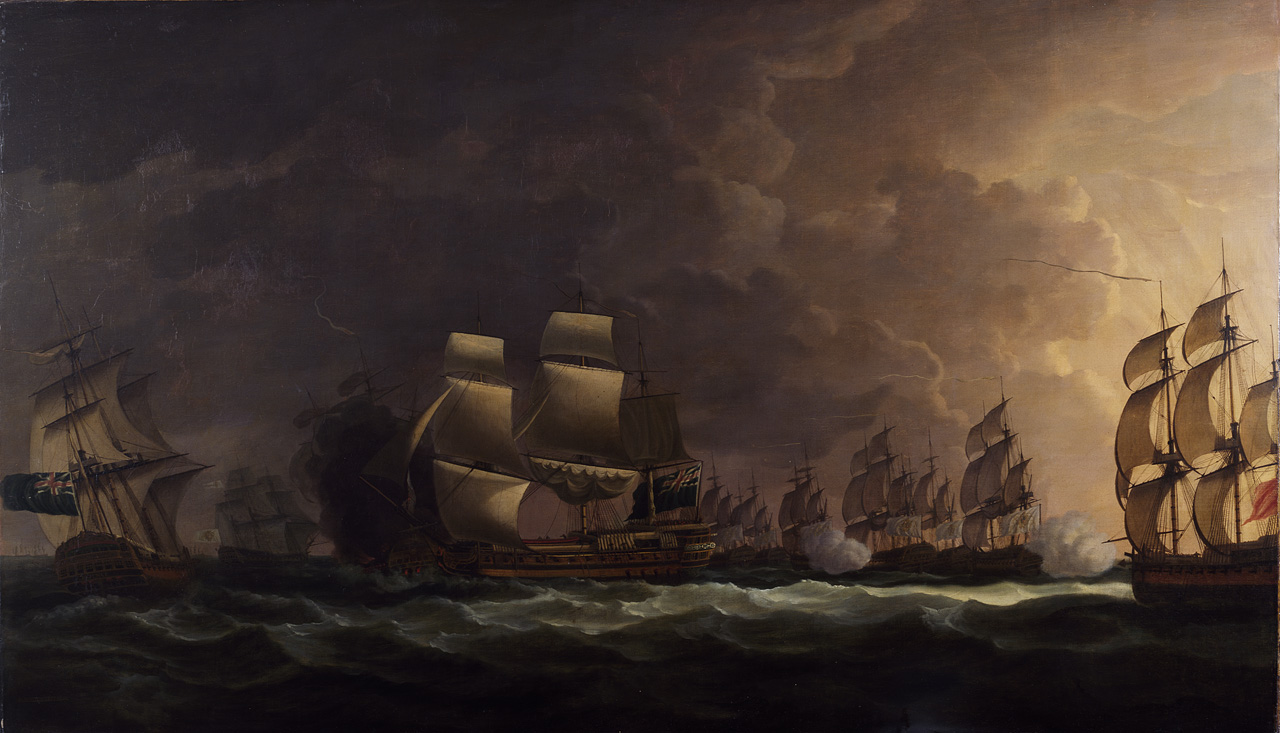
The Moonlight Battle (Dominic Serres, 1781)

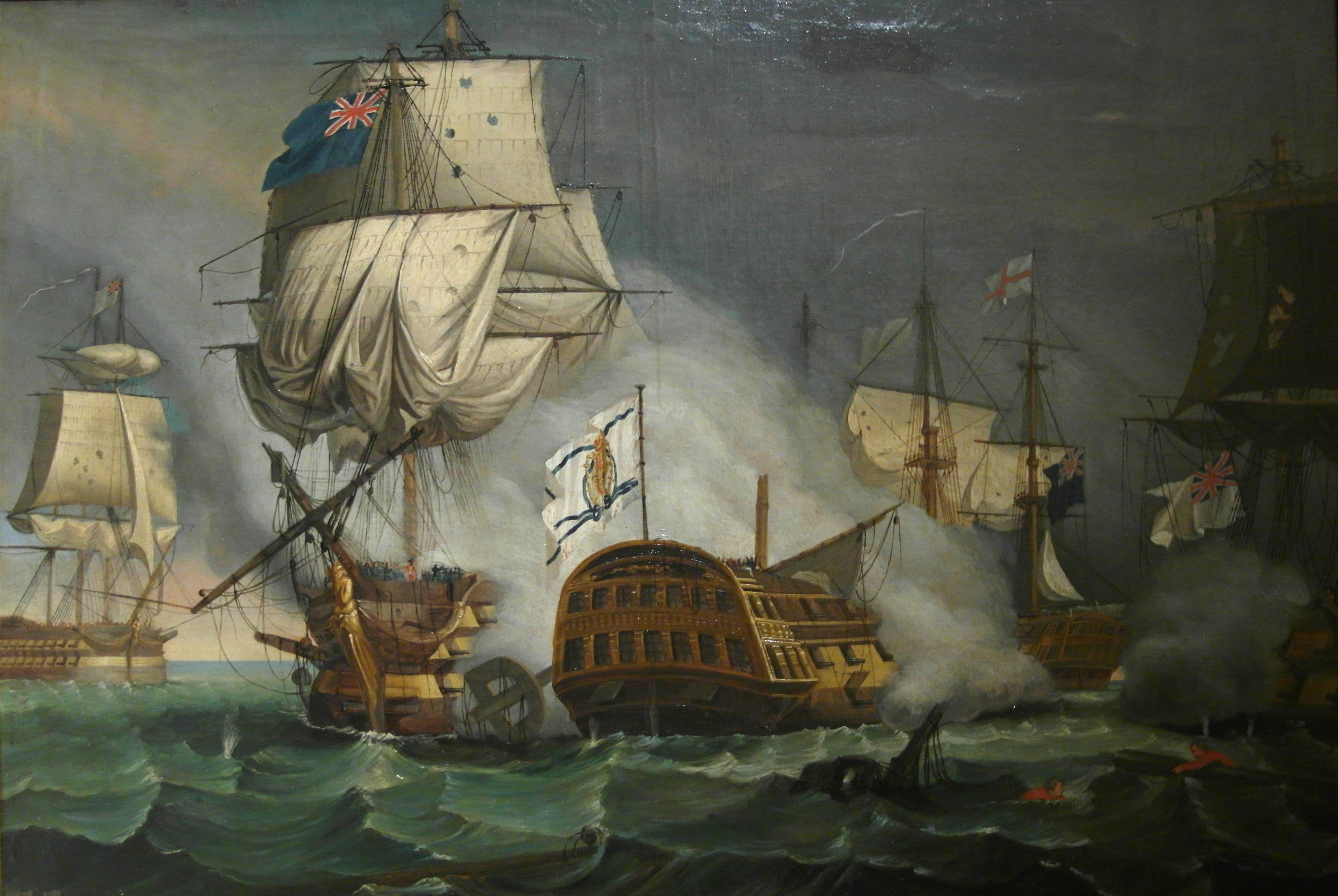
Spanish painting of the battle

The Moonlight Battle off Cape St. Vincent, 16 January 1780 (Richard Paton, 1780–1782)

== Aftermath ==
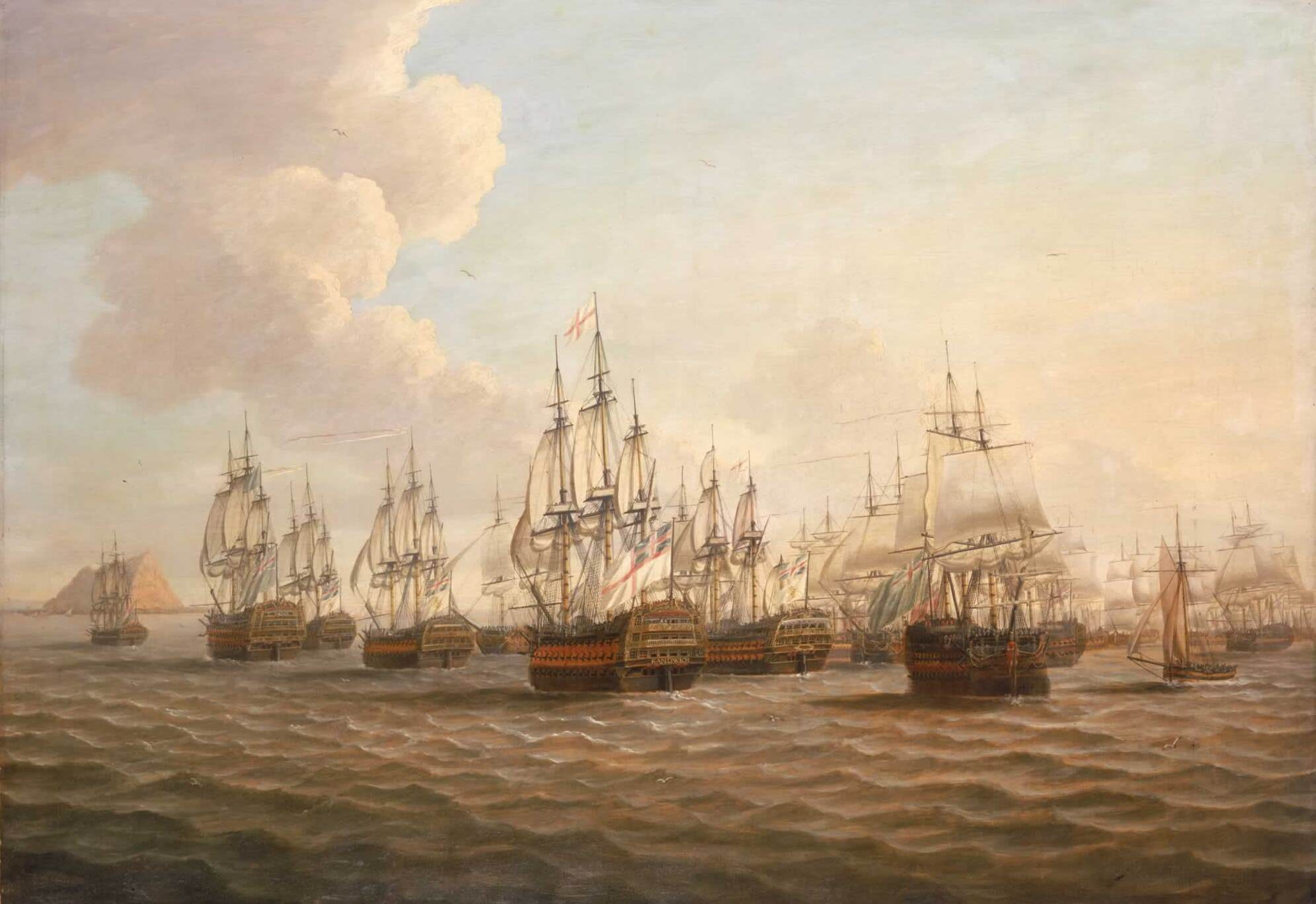
Rodney's fleet with their four prizes after the battle

With the arrival of daylight, it was clear that the British fleet and their prize ships were dangerously close to a lee shore with an onshore breeze. One of the prizes, San Julián, was recorded by Rodney as too badly damaged to save, and was driven ashore. Another prize, San Eugenio, was retaken by her crew and managed to reach Cádiz; she was later restored to service within two months, and remained so until taken to pieces at Cádiz in 1804. A Spanish history claims that the prize crews of both ships needed the captive Spanish crewmen to escape the lee shore. The Spanish captains retook control, imprisoned the British crews, and sailed to Cádiz. The British reported their casualties as 32 killed, 102 wounded. The supply convoy sailed into Gibraltar on 19 January, driving the remaining blockade fleet back to port in Algeciras. Rodney arrived several days later, after first stopping in Tangier. The wounded Spanish prisoners, who included Lángara, were offloaded there, and the British garrison was heartened by the arrival of the supplies and the presence of Prince William Henry.

After also resupplying Minorca, Rodney sailed for the West Indies in February, detaching part of the fleet for service in the Channel. This homebound fleet intercepted a French fleet destined for the East Indies, capturing one warship and three supply ships. Gibraltar was resupplied twice more before the siege was lifted at the end of the war in 1783. Lángara and other captured Spanish officers were eventually released on parole, with Charles III of Spain promoting Lángara to lieutenant general. He continued to serve in the Spanish navy, being appointed as the naval minister during the French Revolutionary Wars. Rodney was lauded for his victory, the first major victory of the war by the Royal Navy over its European opponents. He distinguished himself for the remainder of the war, notably winning the 1782 Battle of the Saintes in which he captured French Admiral de Grasse. He was, however, criticised by Captain Young, who portrayed him as weak and indecisive in the battle with Lángara. (He was also rebuked by the admiralty for leaving a ship of the line at Gibraltar, against his express orders.) Rodney's observations on the benefits of copper sheathing in the victory were influential in British Admiralty decisions to deploy the technology more widely.

== Order of battle ==
None of the listed sources give an accurate accounting of the ships in Rodney's fleet at the time of the action. Robert Beatson lists the composition of the fleet at its departure from England, and notes which ships separated to go to the West Indies, as well as those detached to England to return the prizes captured on 8 January. He does not list two ships (Dublin and Shrewsbury, identified in despatches reprinted by Syrett) that were separated from the fleet on 13 January. Furthermore, HMS Prince William is sometimes misunderstood to have been part of the prize escort back to England, but she was present at Gibraltar after the action. Beatson also fails to list a number of frigates, including Apollo, which played a key role in the capture of Monarca.

British fleet
Ship	Rate	Guns	Commander	Casualties		
Ship	Rate	Guns	Commander	Killed	Wounded	Total
Sandwich	Second-rate	90	Admiral of the White Sir George Rodney (fleet commander); Captain Walter Young	0	0	0
Royal George	First-rate	100	Rear-admiral Robert Digby; Captain John Bourmaster	0	0	0
Prince George	Second-rate	90	Rear-admiral Sir John Lockhart-Ross; Captain Philip Patton	1	3	4
Ajax	Third-rate	74	Captain Samuel Uvedale	0	6	6
Alcide	Third-rate	74	Captain John Brisbane	0	0	0
Bedford	Third-rate	74	Captain Edmund Affleck	3	9	12
Culloden	Third-rate	74	Captain George Balfour	0	0	0
Cumberland	Third-rate	74	Captain Joseph Peyton	0	1	1
Defence	Third-rate	74	Captain James Cranston	10	12	22
Edgar	Third-rate	74	Captain John Elliot	6	20	26
Invincible	Third-rate	74	Captain Samuel Cornish	3	4	7
Marlborough	Third-rate	74	Captain Taylor Penny	0	0	0
Monarch	Third-rate	74	Captain Adam Duncan	3	26	29
Montagu	Third-rate	74	Captain John Houlton	0	0	0
Resolution	Third-rate	74	Captain Sir Chaloner Ogle	0	0	0
Terrible	Third-rate	74	Captain John Leigh Douglas	6	12	18
Bienfaisant	Third-rate	64	Captain John MacBride	0	0	0
Prince William	Third-rate	64	Captain Erasmus Gower	0	0	0
Apollo	Fifth-rate	32	Captain Philemon Pownoll			
Convert	Fifth-rate	32	Captain Henry Harvey			
Triton	Sixth-rate	28	Captain Skeffington Lutwidge			
Pegasus	Post ship	24	Captain John Bazely			
Porcupine	Post ship	24	Captain Lord Hugh Seymour			
Hyaena	Post ship	24	Captain Edward Thompson			
Unless otherwise cited, table information is from Beatson, pp. 232, 234, and Syrett, p. 274. Full captain names are from Syrett, p. 259. Blank casualty report fields mean there was no report listed for that ship.

There are some discrepancies between British and Spanish sources regarding Lángara's fleet, principally in its number of guns. The table below lists the Spanish records of Lángara's fleet. However, Beatson lists all of the Spanish ships of the line at 70 guns, except that he correctly rates Fénix at 80 guns, but San Julián incorrectly at 64 guns. Spanish archives confirm this except for San Julián.

One frigate, Santa Rosalia, is listed by Beatson at 28 guns, although she was actually 26 guns. The identify of the second Spanish frigate is different in the two listings. Beatson records her as Santa Gertrudis, 26 guns, with captain Don Annibal Cassoni, while Duro's listing describes her as Santa Cecilia, 34, captain Don Domingo Pérez de Grandallana; Spanish archives confirm the latter. Both frigates did not participate in the battle, and returned to Cádiz.

Spanish fleet
Ship	Type	Guns	Commander	Notes
Fénix	Ship of the line	80	Juan de Lángara; Francisco Javier de Melgarejo y Rojas	Captured, 700 men
Princesa	Ship of the line	70	Manuel León	Captured, 600 men
Diligente	Ship of the line	68	Antonio Albornoz	Captured, 600 men
Monarca	Ship of the line	68	Antonio Oyarvide	Captured, 600 men
Santo Domingo	Ship of the line	74	Ignacio Mendizábal	Blown up with loss of all 550 men
San Agustín	Ship of the line	74	Vicente Doz y Funes	Escaped
San Lorenzo	Ship of the line	74	Juan de Araoz	Escaped with damage
San Julián	Ship of the line	70	Juan Rodríguez de Valcárcel, Marqués de Medina	Captured (600 men), then retaken by her crew but went ashore in storm and wrecked
San Eugenio	Ship of the line	80	Antonio Domonte y Ortiz de Zuniga	Captured (600 men), then retaken by her crew and escaped into Cádiz
San Genaro	Ship of the line	70	Félix Ignacio de Tejada	Not listed in Lángara's line of battle; listed by Beatson as escaping
San Justo	Ship of the line	70	Francisco Urreiztieta	Not listed in Lángara's line of battle; listed by Beatson as escaping with damage
Santa Cecilia	Frigate	34	Domingo Pérez de Grandallana	Wrongly identified as Santa Gertrudis by Beatson; escaped
Santa Rosalia	Frigate	34	Antonio Ramon de Ortega	Escaped
Unless otherwise cited, table information is from Duro, pp. 259, 263, and Beatson, p. 233.

== Sources ==
- Beatson, Robert (1804). Naval and Military Memoirs of Great Britain, from 1727 to 1783, Volume 6. London: Longman, Hurst, Rees and Orme. OCLC 4643956.
- Chartrand, René (2006). Gibraltar 1779–1783: The Great Siege. Courcelle, Patrice (1st ed.). Oxford: Osprey Publishing. ISBN 978-1-84176-977-6. OCLC 255272192. Archived from the original on 27 September 2007.
- Duro, Cesáreo Fernández (1901). Armada Española Desde la Unión de los Reinos de Castilla y de León, Volume 7 (in Spanish). Madrid: Establecimiento Tipográfico. OCLC 4413652. Reprints Lángara's report.
- Harbron, John (1988). Trafalgar and the Spanish Navy. London: Conway Maritime Press. ISBN 978-0-85177-477-0. OCLC 19096677.
- Lafuente, Modesto (1858). Historia General de España, Volume 20 (in Spanish). Madrid: Establecimiento Tipográfico de Mellado. OCLC 611596.
- Mahan, Arthur T (1898). Major Operations of the Royal Navy, 1762–1783. Boston: Little, Brown. p. 449. OCLC 46778589. "langara."
- Stewart, William (2009). Admirals of the World: a Biographical Dictionary, 1500 to the Present. Jefferson, NC: McFarland. ISBN 978-0-7864-3809-9. OCLC 426390753.
- Syrett, David (2007). The Rodney Papers: Selections From the Correspondence of Admiral Lord Rodney. Burlington, VT: Ashgate Publishing. ISBN 978-0-7546-6007-1. OCLC 506119281. Reprints numerous British documents concerning Rodney's entire expedition.
- de Ulloa, Antonio; Pérez Mallaína-Bueno; Pablo Emilio (1995). La campaña de las terceras (in Spanish). Salamanca: Universidad de Sevilla. ISBN 978-84-472-0241-6.
- Willis, Sam (2008). Fighting at Sea in the Eighteenth Century: the Art of Sailing Warfare. Woodbridge, Suffolk: Boydell Press. ISBN 978-1-84383-367-3. OCLC 176925283.
