= HMS Sandwich (1759) =

Ship of the line of the Royal Navy

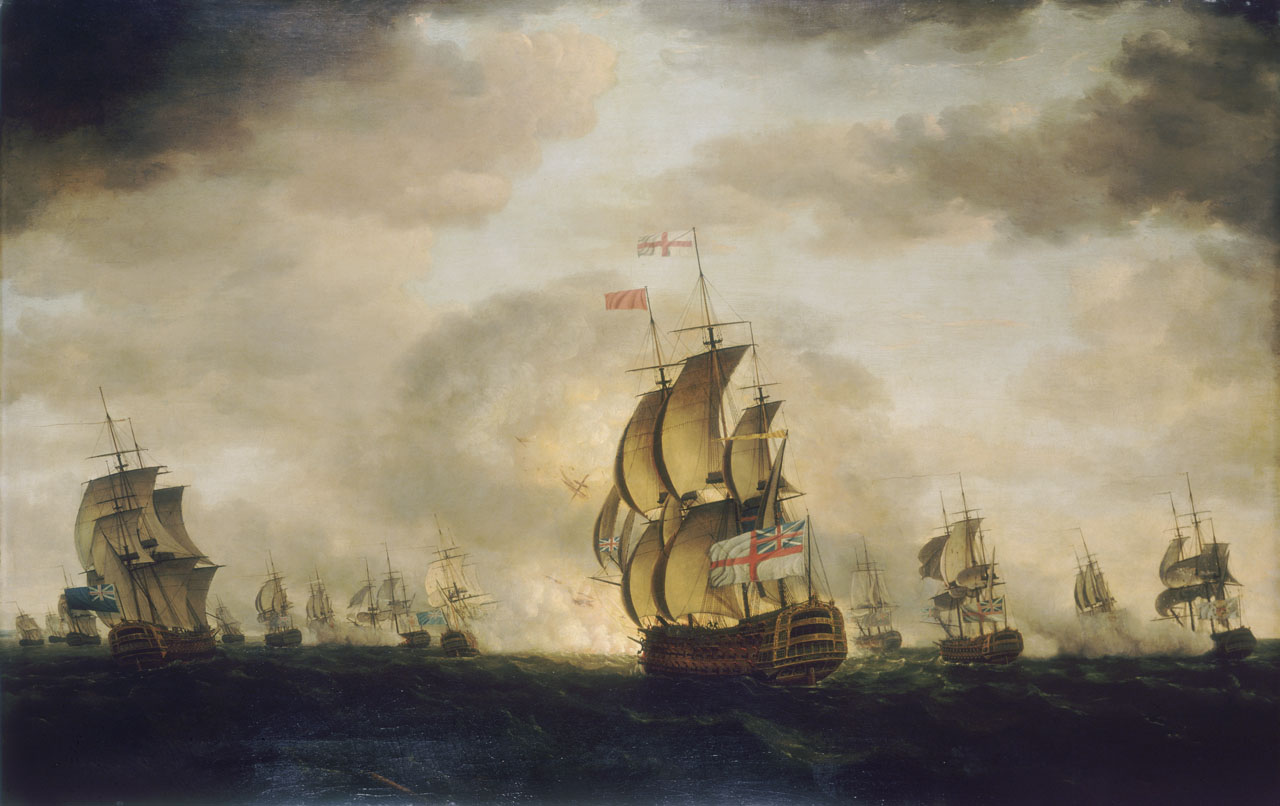
- The moonlight Battle off Cape St Vincent, 16 January 1780 by Francis Holman, painted 1780 shows Santo Domingo exploding, with Rodney's flagship Sandwich in the foreground.

History

Great Britain
- Name: Sandwich
- Ordered: 22 November 1755
- Builder: Chatham Dockyard
- Laid down: 14 April 1756
- Launched: 15 April 1759
- Commissioned: April 1759
- Honours and awards: Participated in: Battle of Cape St Vincent
- Fate: Broken up, 1810
- Notes: Floating battery from 1780; harbour service from 1790

General characteristics
- Class & type: Sandwich-class ship of the line
- Tons burthen: 1869 tons bm
- Length: 176 ft (54 m) (gundeck)
- Beam: 49 ft (15 m)
- Depth of hold: 24 ft (7.3 m)
- Sail plan: Full-rigged ship
- Armament: 90 guns: Gundeck: 28 × 32 pdrs; Middle gundeck: 30 × 18 pdrs; Upper gundeck: 30 × 12 pdrs; Forecastle: 2 × 9 pdrs

HMS Sandwich was a 90-gun second rate ship of the line of the Royal Navy, launched on 14 April 1759 at Chatham.

== Design and construction ==
Sandwich was a 90-gun second-rate Sandwich-class ship of the line. The class, of which Sandwich was the name ship, was designed by naval architect Thomas Slade. It was a stretched version of the standard design for a British 90-gun ship, allowing extra long guns to be placed on the gundecks of the ships, meaning that the quarterdeck had to hold less guns and the sailing qualities of the ships were improved. The design was approved for use on 12 November 1755. Sandwich had already been ordered by this point, having been done so on 28 October to Chatham Dockyard, where the ship would be built by shipwright John Lock.

Sandwich was laid down on 14 April 1756 and launched on 15 April 1759 with the following dimensions: 176 feet 1 inch (53.7 m) along the upper deck, 145 feet 8 inches (44.4 m) at the keel, with a beam of 49 feet 1 1/2 inches (15 m) and a depth in the hold of 20 feet 11 1/2 inches (6.4 m). The ship measured 1,86936/94 tons burthen, with a draught forward of 14 feet 9 1/2 inches (4.5 m) and aft of 18 feet 0 1/2 inch (5.5 m). Sandwich's fitting out was completed on 28 May, with construction having cost £54,770.

The ship held a crew complement of 750, with twenty-eight 32-pounder long guns on the lower deck, twenty-eight 18-pounders on the middle deck, and thirty 12-pounders on the upper deck. Additionally Sandwich held two 6-pounders on each of the quarterdeck and forecastle. The ship would continue with this armament unchanged, apart from the 6-pounders which were switched out with more 12-pounders in an Admiralty Order on 3 June 1790.

== Service ==
Sandwich was commissioned in April 1759 under the command of Captain Henry Speke, joining the Western Squadron. Speke was replaced by Captain Richard Norbury in July, and at the same time Sandwich became the flagship of Rear-Admiral Francis Geary. The ship subsequently served in an expedition to Quiberon Bay in 1760, before joining the fleet of Admiral Edward Boscawen in the spring. Sandwich then took part in the Capture of Belle Île between 6 April and 8 June 1761, moving to the blockade of Basque Roads in the following year. Sandwich was paid off upon the end of the Seven Years' War in 1763.

Sandwich was brought back into service to become the guardship at Portsmouth in 1765. The ship was recommissioned by Captain Richard Edwards in November 1776, but became Portsmouth guardship again in February 1777. Subsequently, the ship was back at sea, fighting in the Battle of Ushant on 27 August 1778 before being again paid off in 1779. The ship received a refit between September and November of the same year at Portsmouth, being recommissioned at the start of that refit by Captain Walter Young to become the flagship of Admiral Sir George Rodney. In this capacity Sandwich joined the North America and West Indies Station. Tasked with relieving the Great Siege of Gibraltar, Rodney's fleet fought the Action of 8 January 1780 and Battle of Cape St. Vincent on 16 January before completing the first naval relief on 19 January. Sandwich subsequently sailed with Rodney to the West Indies, arriving there on 28 March.

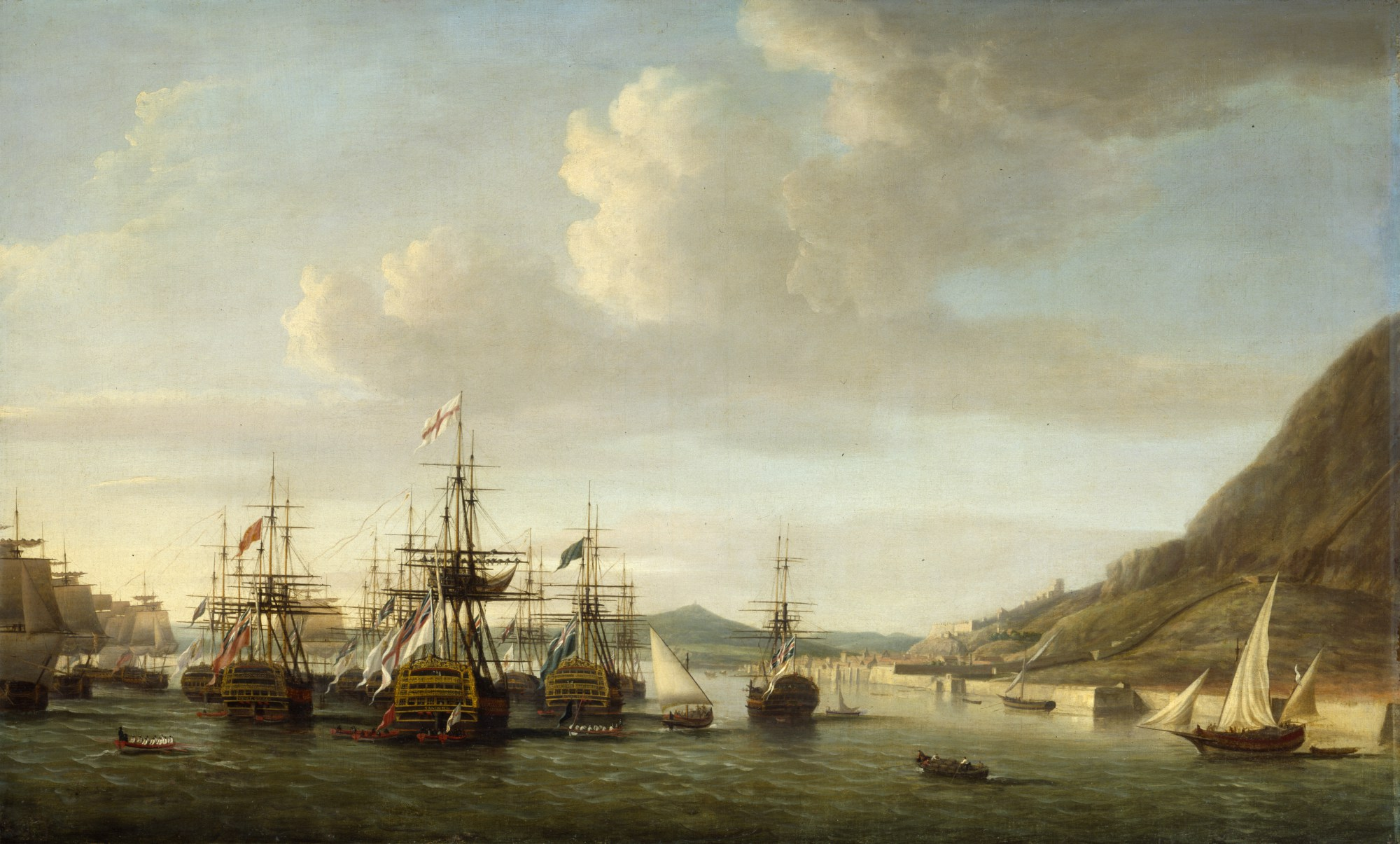
Gibraltar Relieved By Sir George Rodney by Dominic Serres. Rodney's relief fleet at Gibraltar with captured Spanish battleships from the Battle of Cape St Vincent. Sandwich with the tallest mast is to the right of the group flying the flag of St George.

Sandwich fought at the Battle of Martinique on 17 April, and in actions off St Lucia on 15 and 17 May. The ship then sailed to New York on 13 September, arriving on 22 September and arriving back in the West Indies on 12 December. On 3 February 1781 Sandwich took part in the Capture of Sint Eustatius, and in August of that year Young was replaced in command by Captain Sylverius Moriarty, who sailed the ship to Jamaica. There Sandwich became the flagship of Vice-Admiral Sir Peter Parker on the Jamaica Station.

Captain John Cowling replaced Moriarty in around May 1782, and Sandwich sailed back to England with Parker. There the ship was paid off in August. In October Captain John Frodsham took command, and Sandwich became the guardship at the Nore. The ship was paid off again in March 1783, continuing to lie at the Nore. Sandwich was then recommissioned to become a receiving ship at Sheerness in October 1787, with Captain Thomas Tonken in command. The ship was paid off in February 1788, but returned to duty as receiving ship in the Nore in May 1790, still under Tonken. At this time Sandwich was also flagship to Vice-Admiral John Dalrymple, Commander-in-Chief, The Nore. In October the ship moved to serve again as receiving ship at Sheerness before being recommissioned in December 1792 by Captain William Lockyer, who commanded her as guardship at the Nore.

In February 1793 Lockyer was replaced by Captain James Mosse, and Sandwich served in succession as the flagship of three Commanders-in-Chief, The Nore; Dalrymple again from March, Vice-Admiral Charles Buckner from August 1795, and Vice-Admiral Skeffington Lutwidge from July 1797. In May and early June 1797, Sandwich was the 'Parliament Ship' (mutineer flagship) during the Nore mutiny. Richard Parker, the 'President' (figurehead leader) of the mutiny was executed on board the Sandwich on 30 June. In September 1797 Sandwich was paid off again, and recommissioned in November as a prison ship with the rating of a sloop. Based in the River Medway, the ship's next commander was Lieutenant Richard Hancock. Hancock was replaced in April 1798 by Captain Billy Douglas, who in turn handed over to Captain Abraham Guyot in April 1801.

Sandwich was paid off in April 1802 with the Peace of Amiens, but recommissioned in July 1803 with the start of the Napoleonic Wars under the command of Emmanuel Hungerford. Sandwich's final commander was Lieutenant Joseph Coxwell from 1809. The ship was broken up at Chatham in 1810.

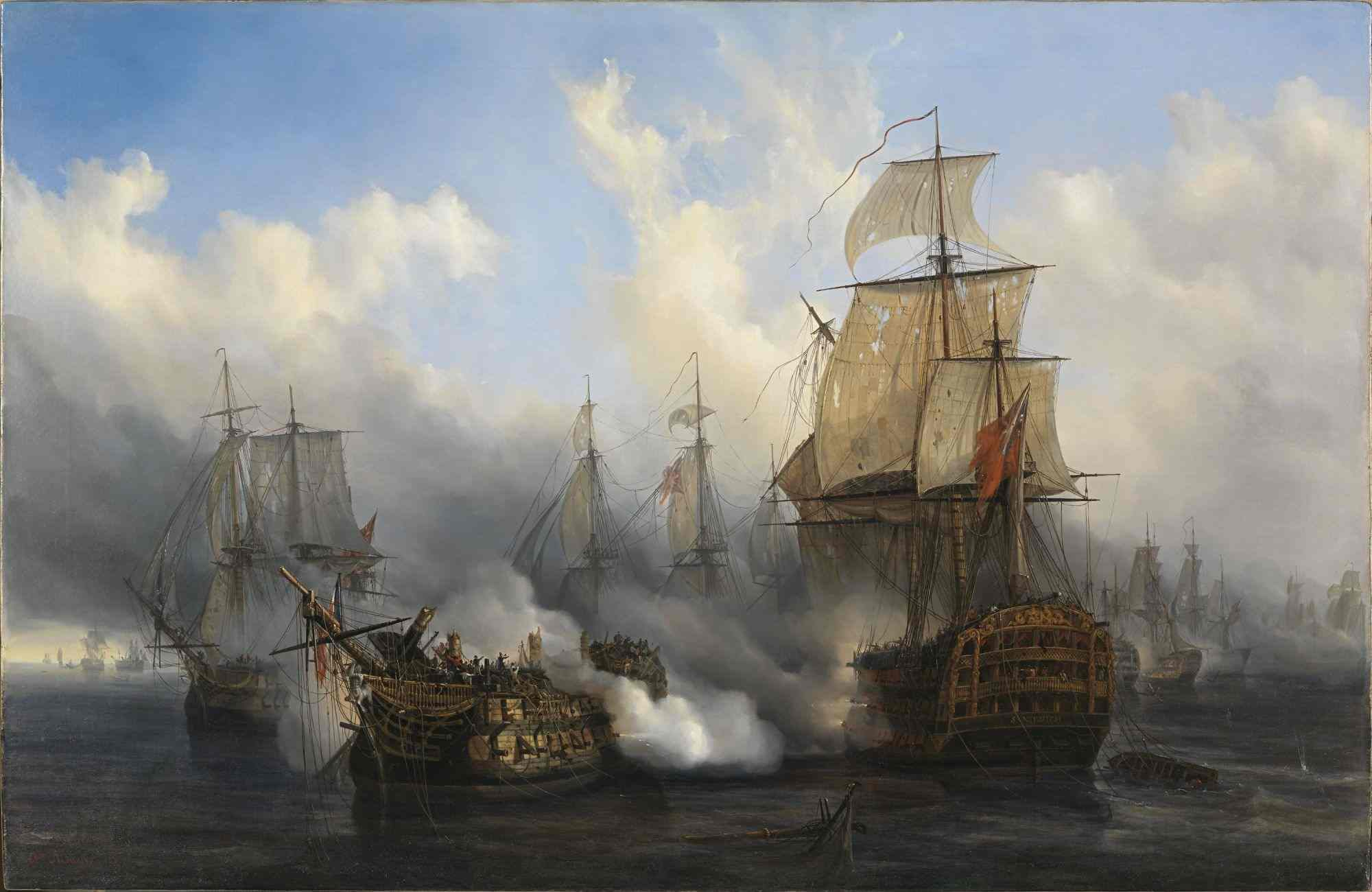
HMS Sandwich fires into the French flagship Bucentaure (the vessel shown completely dismasted in foreground, left of centre) at the battle of Trafalgar. Bucentaure also fights HMS Victory (behind her) and HMS Temeraire (left side of the picture). In fact, Sandwich did not fight at Trafalgar; her presence in this painting is due to a mistake by Auguste Mayer, the painter.
