= Spanish ship Diligente (1756) =

History

Spain
- Name: Diligente
- Launched: 1756
- Captured: 16 January 1780, by Royal Navy
- Notes: Participated in: Battle of Cape St Vincent

Great Britain
- Name: HMS Diligente
- Acquired: 16 January 1780
- Fate: Sold, 2 December 1784

General characteristics
- Class & type: 68-gun third rate ship of the line
- Tons burthen: 1966 tons
- Length: 176 ft 4½ in (53.8 m) (gundeck)
- Beam: 49 ft 10 in (15.2 m)
- Depth of hold: 20 ft 7 in (6.3 m)
- Propulsion: Sails
- Sail plan: Full-rigged ship
- Armament: 68 guns of various weights of shot

Diligente was a 68-gun ship of the line of the Spanish Navy, launched in 1756.

She fought at the Battle of Cape St Vincent in 1780, where she was captured by the Royal Navy and commissioned as the third rate HMS Diligente. She was sold out of the navy in 1784.
