= Juan de Lángara =

Spanish Navy officer (1736–1806)

Juan de Lángara y Huarte
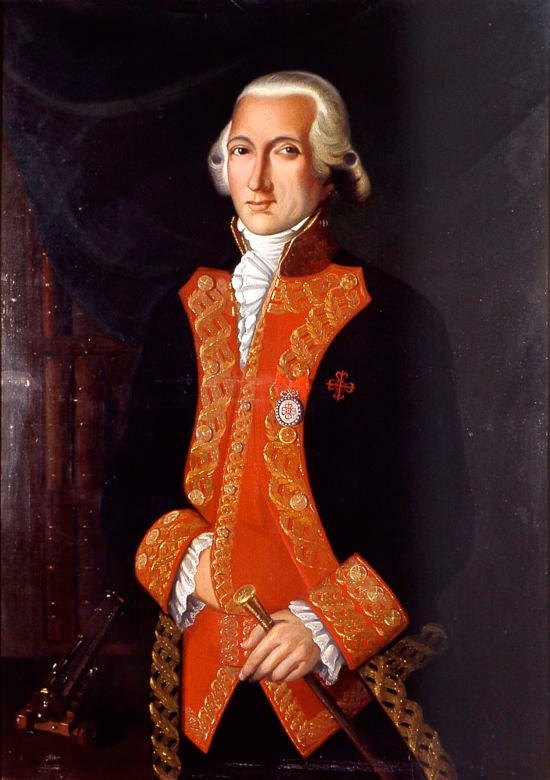
- Portrait of Lángara
- Born: 1736; A Coruña, Galicia
- Died: 18 January 1806 (aged 69–70) Madrid, Spain
- Allegiance: Spain
- Branch: Spanish Navy
- Rank: Captain general of the Navy
- Conflicts: Spanish–Portuguese War (1776–1777); American Revolutionary War; Armada of 1779; Battle of Cape St. Vincent (1780) (POW); French Revolutionary Wars; Siege of Toulon (1793); Battle of the Gulf of Roses

Captain general of the Navy Juan Francisco de Lángara y Huarte (1736 – 18 January 1806) was a Spanish Navy officer and politician.

== Life and career ==
=== Early life ===
Juan Francisco de Lángara y Huarte was born in 1736 at A Coruña, Galicia into a Basque family. His father was admiral Juan de Langara Arizmendi, who fought as lieutenant (Teniente de Navío) at the Battle of Minorca. Having entered the Spanish Navy at a young age, in 1750, as a Guardiamarina, Lángara quickly distinguished himself in various wars. From 1766 until 1771 he made several scientific expeditions, among others, three voyages to the Philippines and the China Sea, and made several important contributions in cartography. In 1774 he commanded the frigate La Rosalia on a scientific expedition, which led to several important discoveries with regards to pilotage and navigation.

=== Anglo-Spanish War (1779–83) ===
By 1778, he was at the rank of brigadier and participated in the Armada of 1779, capturing the British corvette HMS Winchcomb, the only Royal Navy ship lost during the failed expedition. When the combined fleet wintered at Brest and Cádiz respectively, during the winter 1779–80, Lángara was left in command of a small squadron of 11 ships of the line. Promoted to squadron commander in December 1779, he fought against a British fleet of 18 ships of the line and 6 frigates under Admiral of the White Sir George Rodney in the afternoon of 16 January 1780.

Lángara's intention had been to intercept a British convoy destined for the relief of Gibraltar; but the French authorities, who knew well enough about Rodney's departure and strength, failed to warn the Spanish, who maintained Lángara's fatal orders until it was too late. He and his crews could not prevent the British from capturing five of their own number, while the 70-gun Santo Domingo blew up during the early evening. Lángara surrendered at 2 a.m. with his flagship, the 80-gun Fénix, completely battered. This battle is known as the Moonlight Battle, because it was unusual for naval battles in the age of sail to take place at night. Released from captivity soon afterwards, Lángara's career did not suffer. By 1798 he was promoted to captain general of the Navy, after serving for a time as an effective naval minister.

=== French Revolutionary Wars ===
In 1793 he joined Sir Samuel Hood, with 18 Spanish ships-of-the-line, in occupying the French naval arsenal of Toulon (August–December). The mutual cooperation between the two sides was marked by tension and suspicion. Horatio Nelson had acquired a poor opinion of Spanish seamen when he visited the port of Cádiz on his way to the Mediterranean, which is not surprising as the Spanish mercantile marine was so small that only about 10 per cent of the Spanish Navy's crewmen were experienced seamen. At Toulon, these tensions made it difficult to defend the newly-captured arsenal. When Federico Gravina was heavily wounded, a Spanish lieutenant general called Valdez asserted his own claim to overall command of the allied force. In support of that claim, Lángara moved his three-decker Reina Luisa into a position broadside on to HMS Victory with two other three-deckers on her bow and quarter. Hood, however, resisted this attempted intimidation.

Before Toulon was evacuated, British and Spanish incendiary parties commanded by Sir Sidney Smith were sent to destroy the arsenal and the ships in the harbour. It was Lángara who conducted the rear-guard action, in which his men blew up the arsenal and refloated a number of warships, later sent to Britain. Hood was able to get fifteen French ships out of Toulon before the fall of the city. On 14 February 1795, after 6 hours of chase aboard the ship of the line Reina Luisa he captured the 32-gun French frigate Helène.

For a short while, after the alliance between the French First Republic and Spain had been concluded, in 1795, Lángara co-operated with Napoleon during his Italian campaign of 1796, and sailed from Cádiz with nineteen ships of the line and ten frigates, escaped past Rear-admiral Robert Mann's squadron which Jervis had posted to watch Cádiz and passed into the Mediterranean Sea. He collected seven ships at Cartagena and cruised as far as Corsica, but did not attack the British squadron lying in San Fiorenzo Bay. He proceeded to Toulon, where the combined Franco-Spanish fleet, totalling 38 ships of the line, heavily outnumbered the British Mediterranean squadron, which had lost a third of its strength after Mann precipitately fled back to the English Channel. The French and Spanish navies' success in joining up in this way caused the British Admiralty to order the Royal Navy to evacuate both Corsica and the Mediterranean.

The same year he was once again appointed Secretary of State for the Navy and made a Counsellor of State. In 1797, he was appointed Inspector-General of the navy. Retiring in 1799, he died in 1806.

== Family ==
His wife, Doña María Lutgarda, the 2nd Marquésa del Real Transporte y de la Victoria, whom he had married in 1758 was the granddaughter of Don Juan José Navarro, 1st Marqués de la Victoria (for his victory over Sir John Byng at Cape Sicié, in 1744) and daughter of the renowned explorer and naval officer Don Antonio de Úlloa.

== Namesakes ==
During Lángara's period at the head of the Spanish navy, Spanish explorers were charting the coast of what is now British Columbia, Canada, and, in their charts, named some land formations after him. His name is still found among place names in BC, including Langara Island, off the coast of northern BC, and Langara College in Vancouver, which was founded in 1970, as the Langara campus of Vancouver Community College, and obtained the status of an independent public college in 1994.
