= Félix Ignacio de Tejada =

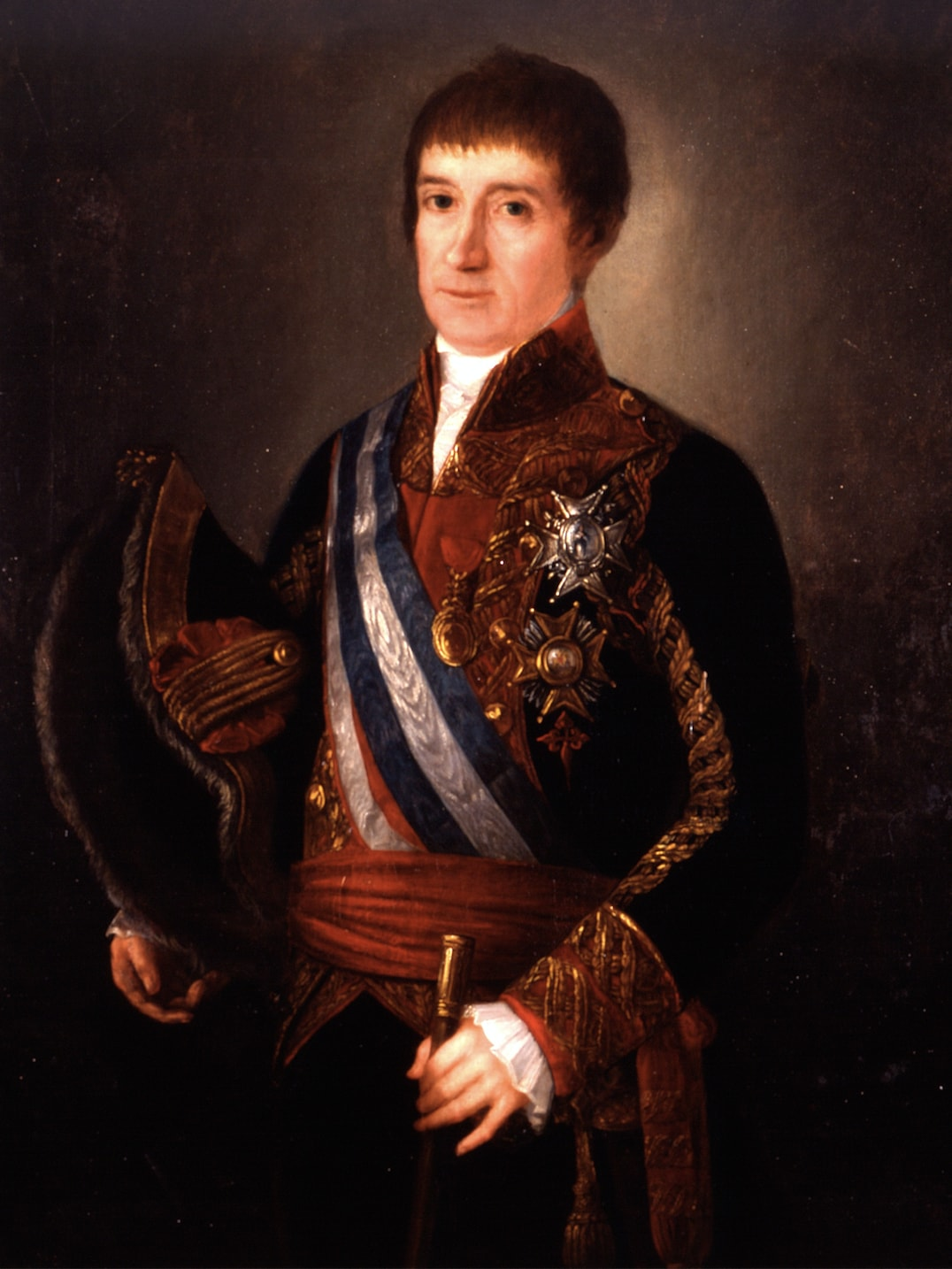
Portrait from the Naval Museum in Madrid.

Félix Ignacio de Tejada y Suárez de Lara (29 July 1735 - 20 February 1817) was a Spanish naval officer. He was a commander of the Order of Santiago, Knight Grand Cross of the Order of Charles III and Knight Grand Cross of the Royal and Military Order of Saint Hermenegild.

== Life ==
He was born in Arévalo into a large and well-off family. He was baptised at the church of Santa María la Mayor in Arévalo in August 1735. His father Lorenzo de Tejada y Porras, was lord of Santa Cruz de Rodezno, Andino and Andinillo and born in Santo Domingo de la Calzada (La Rioja), and his mother was Josefa María Suárez de Lara y Melgosa, born in Olmedo (Valladolid). His father's father, Lorenzo Tejada Vallejo y Duque de Estrada, was lord of Río Tirón, and permanent counsellor and chief constable in Santo Domingo de la Calzada. His mother's father, José Suárez de Lara y Bracamonte Zúñiga, was permanent counsellor of Olmedo and lord of the towns of Olmedo and Torralba.

He enlisted as a 'guardiamarina' (midshipman) in the Company of the Department of Cádiz on 7 April 1753 and sailed on sixteen privateering voyages between 1755 and 1766, by the end of which period he had risen to teniente de fragata. In 1764 he took command of the jabek Cuervo and was commanded to burn the 22 gun Algerian pink - he caught up with, captured and burned it despite fire from the forecastle and the ship. His next command was the schooner San José, with which in 1765 he helped capture a Tunisian gunboat, an Algerian gunboat and a Catalan barque.

He continued patrolling along the Barbary Coast, commanding the schooner Brillante and leading the ships San Francisco, San Antonio and San Carlos against a six-gun Algerian xebec in 1766. In the invasion of Algiers he was second-in-command of the 80-gun ship of the line San Rafael, distinguishing himself in the action by that ship and the 74-gun ship against the castle on the Xarache river, protecting the troops as they reembarked. On returning to the naval base at Cartagena he took command of the xebec Gamo, with which he continued privateering in the Mediterranean, leading a division composed of his ship and the xebecs Pilar, San Luis and Garzota, four small ships from Minorca, and the frigates Carmen and Lucía. With these forces he captured two Algerian xebecs, one of 24 guns and 26 guns, and a Portuguese packet boat which they had captured. He destroyed the batteries which the Africans had built to attack the city of Melilla from the landward side and recaptured a merchant frigate from Barcelona which was under fire from the batteries in Algiers. For his actions he was granted the encomienda of Villafranca and the Order of Santiago, of which he was already a professed knight.

In 1778, he took command of the ship of the line Real Fénix and later the San Jenaro, both forming part of General Luis de Córdova's squadron, which, together with the French squadron of the Comte D'Orvilliers, operated in the English Channel, capturing the 64-gun English ship HMS Ardent. He also served in the forces that blockaded Gibraltar, protected the floating batteries from attack, and participated in the Battle of Cape Spartel against Admiral Howe's British squadron.

Promoted to rear admiral on 3 May 1782, he was appointed Inspector General of the Navy in Madrid, and as such, advisor to the Supreme War Council. He inspected the arsenals, and his reports led to significant reforms that increased the Navy's effectiveness. In 1789, he commanded a squadron operating in the Mediterranean. On 3 November 1796 he was appointed Captain General of the department of Ferrol - it was largely thanks to important defensive measures put in place under his command that the British attack in 1800 was repelled.

After the Dos de Mayo Uprising and the outbreak of the Peninsular War, Tejada contributed 3,000 ounces of silver from his own wealth to support the Galician Junta. The Supreme Central Junta promoted him to Captain General, the highest rank in the navy, and made him director of the navy. That position required him to remain in Seville until the French advance forced both him and the Junta to move to Cádiz, in whose stronghold they held out despite fierce attacks. In 1815, when Spain set up its Admiralty Ministry, Tejada was the first to head it. He was later dean and head of the naval jurisdiction at the court and died in Madrid.

== External links (in Spanish) ==
- González Fernández, Marcelino (2018). "Félix Ignacio de Tejada y Suárez de Lara". Diccionario Biográfico Español. Real Academia de la Historia.
- Biography of don Félix Ignacio de Tejada y Suárez de Lara, Historia Naval de España.
- Text adapted with author's permission, allowed on Wikipedia under GFDL license: Foro de Historia Naval de España y Países de habla española (registration required).
