= Francis Holman =

British maritime painter

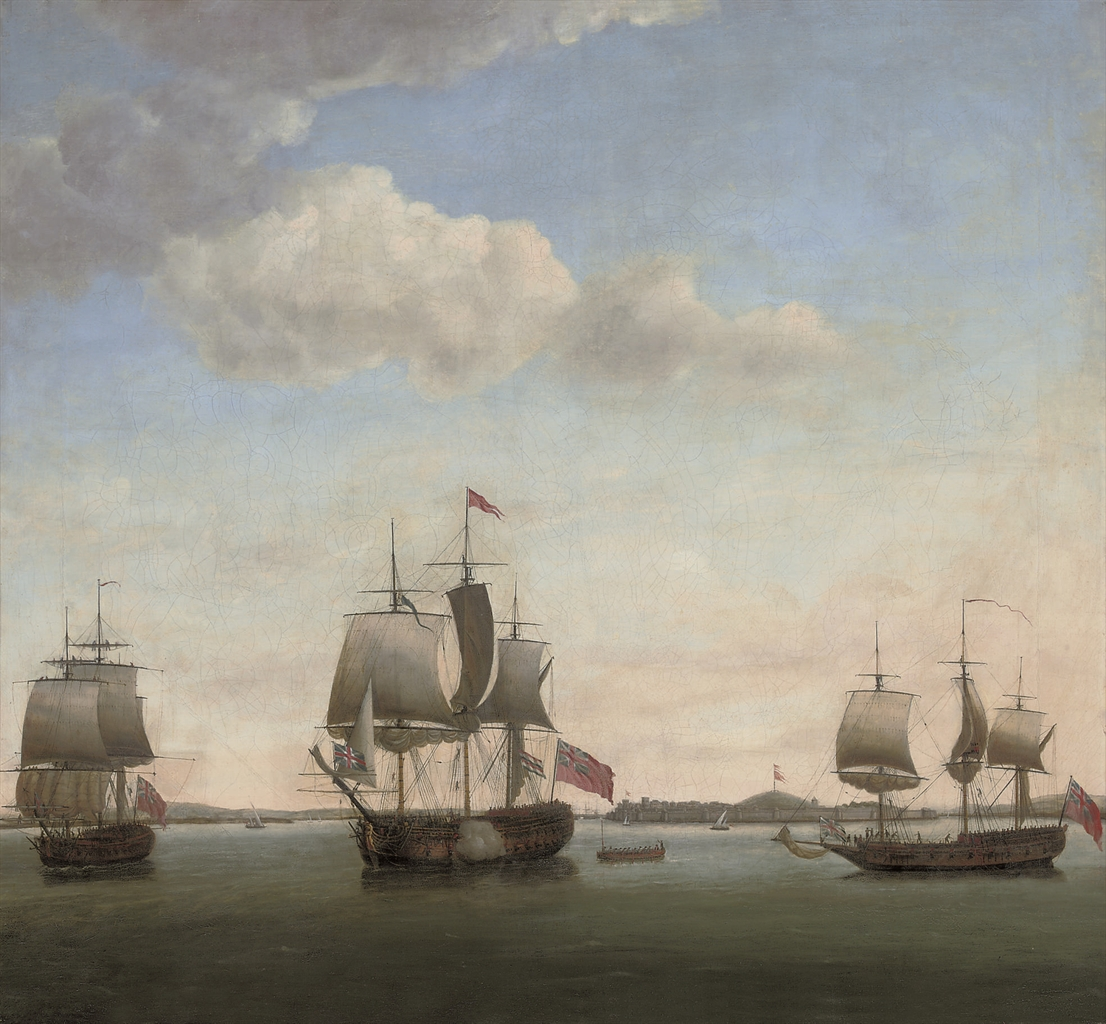
- Francis Holman Painting of Commodore James in HCS Protector, with HCS Revenge and the HCS grab Bombay in the bay off the Suvarnadug fort at Gheriah, India, April 1755
- Born: 1729; Parish of St Laurence-in-Thanet, Ramsgate, England
- Died: 29 November 1784 (aged c. 55); Wapping, London, England
- Known for: Marine art
- Notable work: Views of London shipyards and river traffic, and naval actions, for example: View of Blackwall Yard; Shipyard on the Thames; Moonlight Battle of Cape St. Vincent

Francis Holman (1729–1784) was a British maritime painter, little recognised during his own lifetime, but whose paintings are now sought after. He is also notable as the teacher of Thomas Luny.

== Life ==
He was born in Ramsgate and baptised on 14 November 1729 at St Laurence-in-Thanet, Ramsgate. He was the eldest son and second of six children of Francis Holman (1696–1739), and his wife, Anne Long (1707–1757). His father was a master mariner, and his grandfather a Ramsgate cooper. His younger brother, Captain John Holman (1733–1816), maintained the family shipping business and remained close to Francis throughout his life. Young Francis would certainly have been immersed in the maritime world during his up-bringing; the legacy of this early knowledge is a wealth of detail and accuracy in his later work.

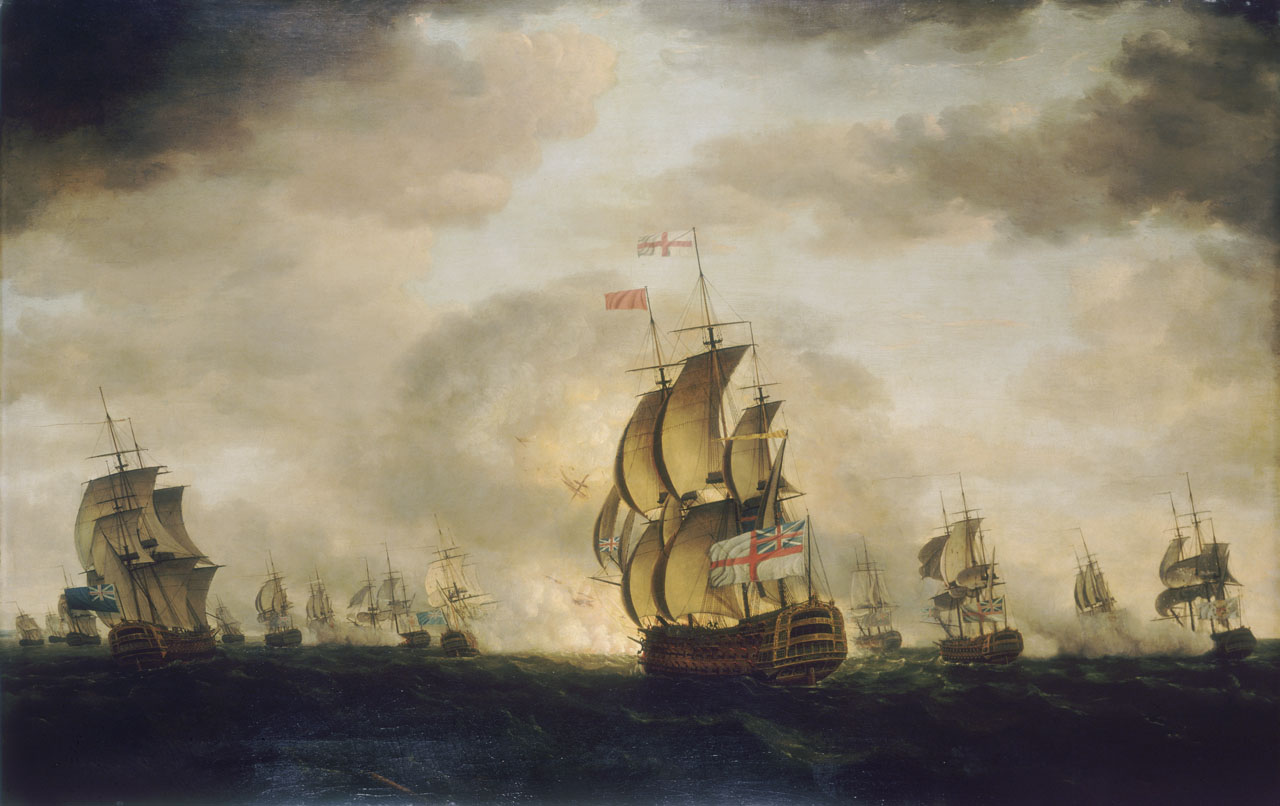
The moonlight Battle of Cape St. Vincent, 16 January 1780 by Francis Holman, painted 1780

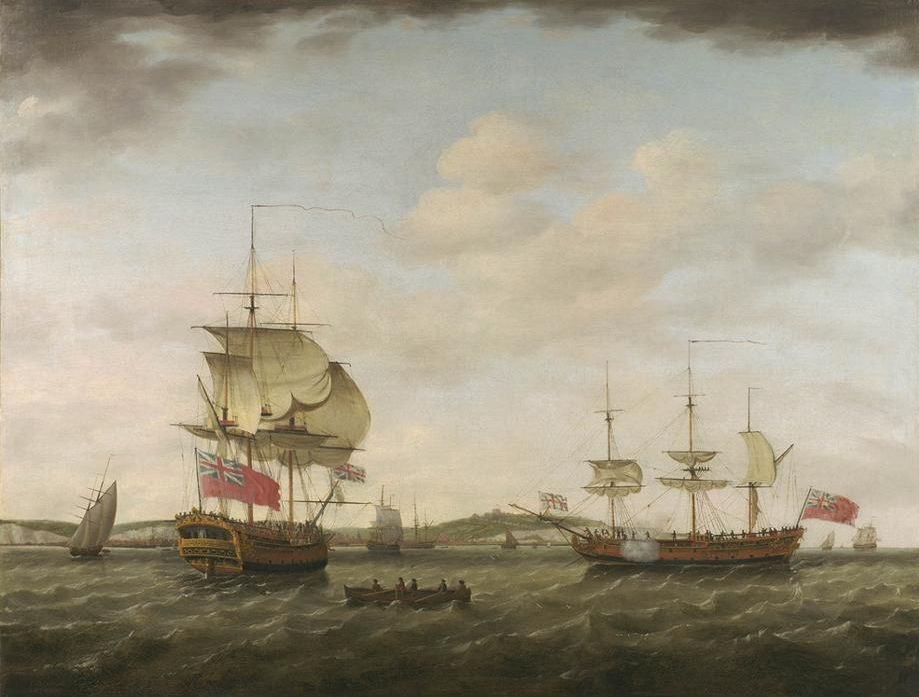
A sixth-rate British man of war off Dover, by Francis Holman, 1777

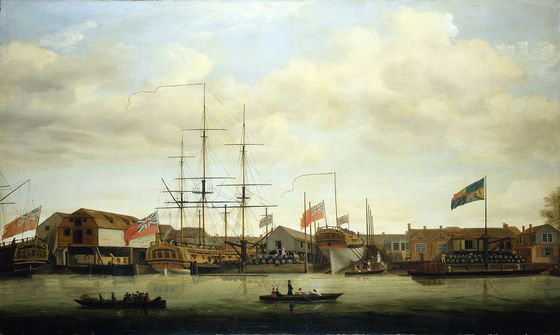
A small shipyard on the Thames, by Francis Holman, between 1760 and 1784

Francis Holman lived in at least five addresses in Wapping on the Thames in London. He married, firstly, Elizabeth, and they produced 3 sons; John (b. 1757), and two more sons, both named Francis, who died in infancy. Elizabeth's death is unrecorded, but on 7 May 1781 he married, secondly, Jane Maxted (c.1736–1790). He was apparently childless when he wrote his will in 1783.

== Work ==
Holman's earliest works are portraits of ships, commonly commissioned for ships' captains. From 1767 to 1772 he exhibited eleven pictures at the Free Society of Artists, and he began to produce pictures of shipyards and the general life of maritime Britain in the late eighteenth century. By 1773 Holman had taken on Thomas Luny as an apprentice; Luny later became a major maritime painter in his own right.

With the American War of Independence and the strong contemporary public interest in the Royal Navy, it was natural that Holman should turn his talents towards more patriotic themes. Between 1774 and 1784 he sent seventeen pictures, mostly of the Royal Navy or sea battles, for exhibition at the Royal Academy. His most notable painting of the American War of Independence is The Moonlight Battle off Cape St. Vincent, 16 January 1780 (shown right).

== Fate ==
Holman died in Wapping on 29 November 1784. Captain John Holman brought his body back to Ramsgate for burial on 4 December in Jane's family vault at St Laurence, where the vicar recorded his death as due to "lethargy".

== Artistic achievement ==
According to Lionel Cust in the Dictionary of National Biography, Holman's work "met with unmerited neglect". More recently, his paintings have achieved good prices at auction and form significant collections at museums, not least the National Maritime Museum. His attention to detail and in-depth knowledge of his subject have left us with a valuable record of eighteenth century maritime life, and consequently his reputation as a major marine painter has grown. His importance as the teacher of Thomas Luny has also enhanced his reputation.

== Bibliography ==
- A Dictionary of British Marine Painters, Arnold Wlison, A & C Black Publishers Ltd, 1970, ISBN 0-85317-051-7
- The Dictionary of 18th Century British Painters, Ellis Waterhouse, published by Antique Collectors' Club Ltd, 1981, ISBN 0-902028-93-6
