= HMS Ferret (1784) =

Sloop of the Royal Navy

History

Great Britain
- Name: HMS Ferret
- Namesake: Ferret
- Ordered: 18 February 1782
- Builder: Andrew Hills, Sandwich
- Laid down: February 1783
- Launched: 17 August 1784
- Fate: Sold 16 December 1801

United Kingdom
- Name: Ferrett
- Owner: Daniel Bennett
- Acquired: c. end of 1801
- Fate: Broken up in 1817

General characteristics
- Class & type: Modified Childers-class
- Type: Brig-sloop
- Tons burthen: 20121/94 or 208, or 210 (bm)
- Length: 78 ft 11 in (24.1 m) (overall); 60 ft 8 in (18.5 m) (keel)
- Beam: 25 ft 0 in (7.6 m)
- Depth of hold: 10 ft 10 1/2 in (3.3 m)
- Propulsion: Sails
- Sail plan: Brig
- Complement: HMS: 80 (later 90); Whaler: 25
- Armament: HMS: 10 × 4-pounder guns + 4 carronades + 12 × ½-pounder swivel guns; Whaler: 10 × 3- & 4-pounder guns
- Notes: Two decks and three masts

HMS Ferret was a brig-sloop of the Royal Navy, launched in 1784 but not completed until 1787. In 1801 the Navy sold her. She then became a whaler, making six whaling voyages to the Pacific between 1802 and 1815. She was broken up in 1817.

== HMS Ferret ==
Ferret finally underwent fitting for sea at Deptford between February and May 1787, and Commander John Osborne commissioned her in May. Commander Davidge Gould replaced Osborne in September 1788, and in return was replaced by Commander Robert Stopford in December 1789. Ferret was on the Gibraltar station at the time. Stopford was briefly Captain (acting), of Ambuscade, but returned to Ferret when the Admiralty would not confirm the appointment. During the Nootka Crisis, a dispute with Spain over Nootka Sound, Ferret was stationed off Cadiz to reconnoitre the Spanish fleet there. Admiral Joseph Peyton then ordered Stopford and Ferret back to England to report his observations.

Commander Richard Rundle Burges replaced Stopford in 1790, and then in January 1791 Commander William Nowell assumed command.

On 30 November 1791 Nowell sailed Ferret for the Jamaica station. There she spent most of her time convoying vessels with supplies that the merchants of Kingston were sending to the white population of San Domingo.

In 1792 there was a civil war in San Domingo between the white and black inhabitants, conducted with great cruelty and atrocities on both sides, some of which Nowell witnessed. That year Captain Thomas McNamara Russell of the 32-gun frigate HMS Diana, on a relief mission to the authorities on Saint-Domingue, received the intelligence that John Perkins, a mulatto (mixed race) British former naval officer from Jamaica, was under arrest and due to be executed in Jérémie for supplying arms to the rebel slaves. Britain and France were not at war and Russell requested that the French release Perkins. The French authorities promised that they would, but didn't. After the exchange of numerous letters, Russell decided that the French were not going to release Perkins. Russell then sailed around Cap-Français to Jérémie and met with Ferret. Russell and Nowell decided that Nowell's first lieutenant, an officer named Godby, would go ashore and recover Perkins whilst the two ships remained offshore within cannon shot, ready to deploy a landing party if need be. Lieutenant Godby landed and after negotiations the French released Perkins.

Ferret returned to England in late 1793.

At the onset of the French Revolutionary Wars, Ferret was assigned to the Downs station under Rear-Admiral M'Bride. There she captured several privateers.

Ferret captured the privateers Jean Bart and Jeune-Marie off Dunkirk on 21 February 1793. Jean Bart was armed with six 3-pounder and four swivel guns, and had a crew of 39 men. Ferret brought both privateers into Ramsgate. (Note: Jean Bart was an English-built privateer of 50 tons (French; "of load"), commissioned in February 1793 under Jean-Baptiste Neuts with 33 to 37 men and 6 guns. Probably retaken in August 1793 and commissioned in the French Navy as the lugger Jean Bart, with 21 men and 8 swivel guns, decommissioned in 1800 in Cherbourg. Jeune Marie was a privateer commissioned in February 1793 under Philippe-Laurent Everaert, of 65 tons (French; "of load"), 38 men and 2 guns.) Ferret and Savage shared in the proceeds of the capture on 10 March of Verandering and Twee Gisberts. Three days later, on 13 March, Ferret captured the neutral ship Fortuna. A week later, on 20 March, Ferret captured the merchant vessel Hercules. Then on 5 April Ferret captured the privateer Fantasie, from Dunkirk, and brought her into The Downs. Fantasie was armed with eight guns and had a crew of 43 men. (Note: Fantasie was a privateer commissioned before April 1793 under Jacques-François Leclerc, of 55 tons (French; "of load"), 38 to 43 men, with 6 guns and 2 swivel guns.) Ferret, and the hired armed cutters Nancy and Dorset shared in the proceeds of the capture of the neutral ships General Van Huth (or General van Hurst) and Liffe en Vriendschap.

On 8 June 1794 Ferret captured Neptunus. Also in June Ferret captured the neutral vessel Constantia.

In November 1794 George Byng was promoted to Commander in Ferret, replacing Nowell. The merchants of London presented Commander Nowell with a silver plate as a token of appreciation for his efforts in suppressing privateers. Between January and April 1795 Commander H. Tookey briefly commanded Ferret. Commander Charles Ekins was promoted to Commander on 16 June 1795 into Ferret, succeeding Byng, when Byng received promotion to post captain. Ferret was then stationed off Flushing.

On 19 November 1795 Ferret captured a French privateer lugger of 30 men, and four 4-pounder and some swivel guns. The privateer had left Calais that day and Ferret had captured her that evening off Blackness Point, Devon. The privateer was later identified as Eleonore.

The very next month Commander Thomas Baker replaced Ekins.

Disposal: The Navy paid off Ferret in February 1796. She was not sold, however, until 16 December 1801, and then for £760.

== Whaler ==
Ferret became a whaler for the firm of Daniel Bennett. In 1802 she was valued at £6000. She would make six whaling voyages for the Bennetts, father and son.

Ferret, under the command of Captain William Blanchford (or Blackford), left Britain on her first whaling voyage on 19 March 1802 for the Brazil Banks. In September she was at Walwich Bay with several other whalers, including Indispensable. In February 1803 she was off the coast of Brazil together with Perseverance and Duchess of Portland, and she returned to Britain on 10 June 1803 with more than 1050 barrels of oil.

For her second whaling voyage, Captain Phillip Skelton received a letter of marque issued on 14 July 1803. He sailed Ferret from Britain on 5 August, bound for New Zealand. Ferrett, Skelton, master, arrived with oil at Port Jackson on 22 January 1804 from the Derwent River. She was reported on the New Zealand Coast in May and November 1804. On 31 January she left St Helena in company with the Indiamen Travers and Union, and the whalers Adventure, Favorite, Perseverance, and Seringapatam. She returned to Britain on 15 April 1806. Ferret had stayed briefly at the Bay of Islands. There she had taken aboard a young Māori named Moehanga. When Ferret docked at London, he became the first of his people to arrive there.

Ferret sailed from Britain on 20 June 1806 on her third whaling voyage, again bound for New Zealand. When he left he took Moehanga with him, returning him to New Zealand. On 15 September she left Port Jackson. On 22 July 1807 she was again at Port Jackson. Historical records of New South Wales record her as having 100 tons of oil, being armed with 10 guns, and having a crew of 25. In September 1807 she was "all well"" at New Zealand. She left New Zealand for London on 26 June 1808 and by 19 August was at St Helena.

Ferrett left Britain on 20 February 1809 on her fourth whaling voyage. Her master was Phillip Skelton, but at some point Andrew Stirton became master. She returned to Britain on 18 December 1810.

For her fifth whaling voyage Captain William Simmonds (or Simminds, or Simmons) sailed from London on 5 February 1811. He then joined a convoy that departed 19 March from Portsmouth. Ferret returned to Britain on 9 January 1813.

Captain Henry Gardner (or Gardiner) sailed Ferret on her sixth (and last) whaling voyage, leaving Britain on 24 February 1813. They returned on 22 November 1815.

== Fate ==
Ferret is no longer listed after 1816. She was broken up in 1817.
