= Robert Sutton de Clonard =

French naval officer (1751-1788)

- Born: 1751
- Died: 1788 (aged 36–37)

Robert Sutton de Clonard (or Closnard; 11 August 1751 in Wexford, Ireland – 1788, Vanikoro, Solomon Islands) was a French naval officer of Irish descent, notable for his role in the War of American Independence and in the Lapérouse expedition.

== Family background ==
Chevalier Robert Sutton de Clonard was born to Thomas Sutton de Clonard, an officer in the French East India Company, and to Phyllis Masterson, from Castletown. Thomas travelled several times to India on business.

Several members of the family served in the Royal Navy, notably Robert's uncle Lieutenant Thomas de Clonard, and Robert's younger brother, who was killed on 15 December 1778 during the Battle of St. Lucia while serving on Languedoc.

== Biography ==
Robert Sutton de Clonard started sailing in 1768, serving on the East Indiamen Laverdy and Duc-de-Praslin.

In 1774, as Lapérouse defended the besieged Mahé on the French ship Seine, Clonard was in command of a one-gun boat, which he used to attack shore positions, sustaining a light wound in the action.

On 16 March 1775, Clonard successfully defended a small fort. As Louis XVI awarded him a 300-pound pension for his conduct, he requested that the Order of Saint Louis be granted instead as he was "more sensitive to honour than to pecuniary graces".

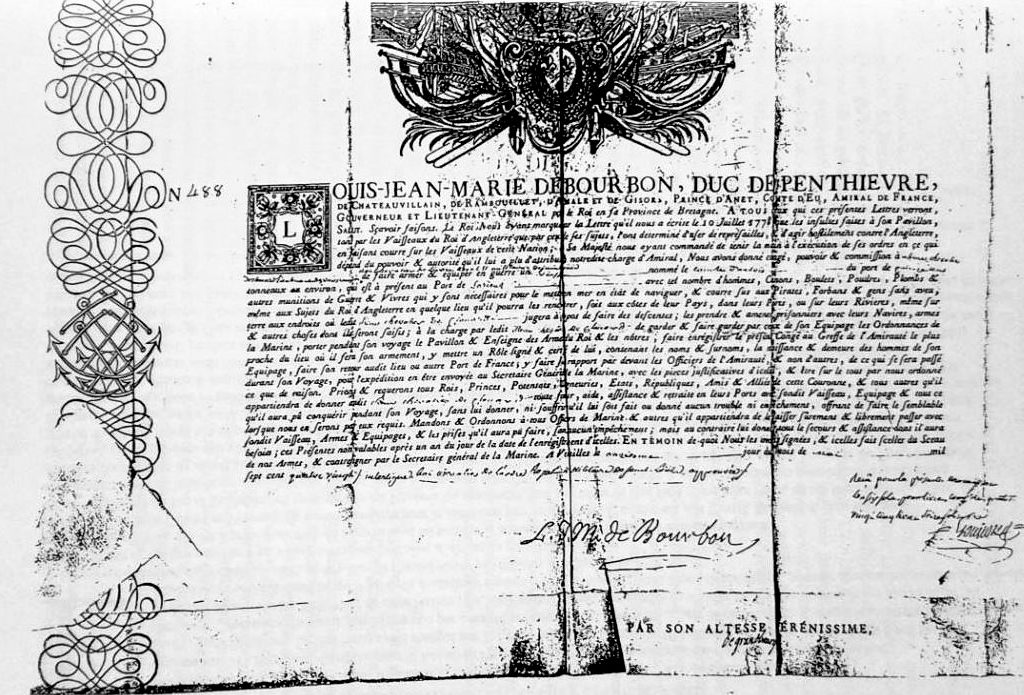
Letter of Marque given to Clonard for Comte d'Artois.

Promoted to Lieutenant, he served on Glorieux under Captain vicomte d'Escars in the War of American Independence, taking part in the Invasion of Tobago on 30 May 1781. Captured by the British, he was exchanged and given command of the privateer Comte d'Artois, a large East Indiaman converted to a privateer, capturing several British merchantmen but encountering several warships on his second journey.

In the action of 13 August 1780, Comte d'Artois encountered HMS Bienfaisant, and HMS Charon, which was further away. The British warships had been looking for Comte d'Artois and an engagement ensued in which Sutton was eventually forced to strike his colours. Of his crew, 21 men were killed and 35 wounded; Clonard himself was slightly wounded. Bienfaisant had three men killed and 20 wounded. Charon only joined the action towards the end of the engagement and only had a single man wounded. Two British frigates, Licorne and Hussar, also came up towards the end of the action and so shared in the prize money with Bienfaisant and Charon.

Clonard was released after his capture and on 12 September took command of Diligente on the orders of the comte de Grasse.

In 1782, Diligente was lost, and Clonard was cited for his "prudence (...) courage and (...) strength of character". In the next seven years, he served as first lieutenant in charge of intendance (provisions), sailed to Riga to procure wood, and served in India and American in combat operations.

By 1785, Clonard had served in eight campaigns, including three as commanding officer. He was tasked with commissioning Boussole for her scientific campaign under Lapérouse.

From 29 April, Clonard was appointed to Boussole. He initially served as the administrative officer.

On 1 January 1787 Clonard was promoted to the rank of capitaine de vaisseau. However, from November 1786 on he had been the recipient of a supplement of 120 livres as a flag captain.

On 12 December 1787 Clonard transferred to Astrolabe.

== Disappearance ==
La Perouse's expedition vanished mysteriously in 1788 after leaving Botany Bay on 10 March 1788. In 1827 Captain Peter Dillon eventually discovered the fate of the expedition when he found remnants of Astrolabe and Boussole at Vanikoro Island in the Solomon Islands. The ships had been wrecked in a storm.

Survivors from one ship had been massacred while survivors from the other ship had constructed their own small boat and sailed off the island, never to be heard from again.
