= David Macbride =

Irish chemist and physician

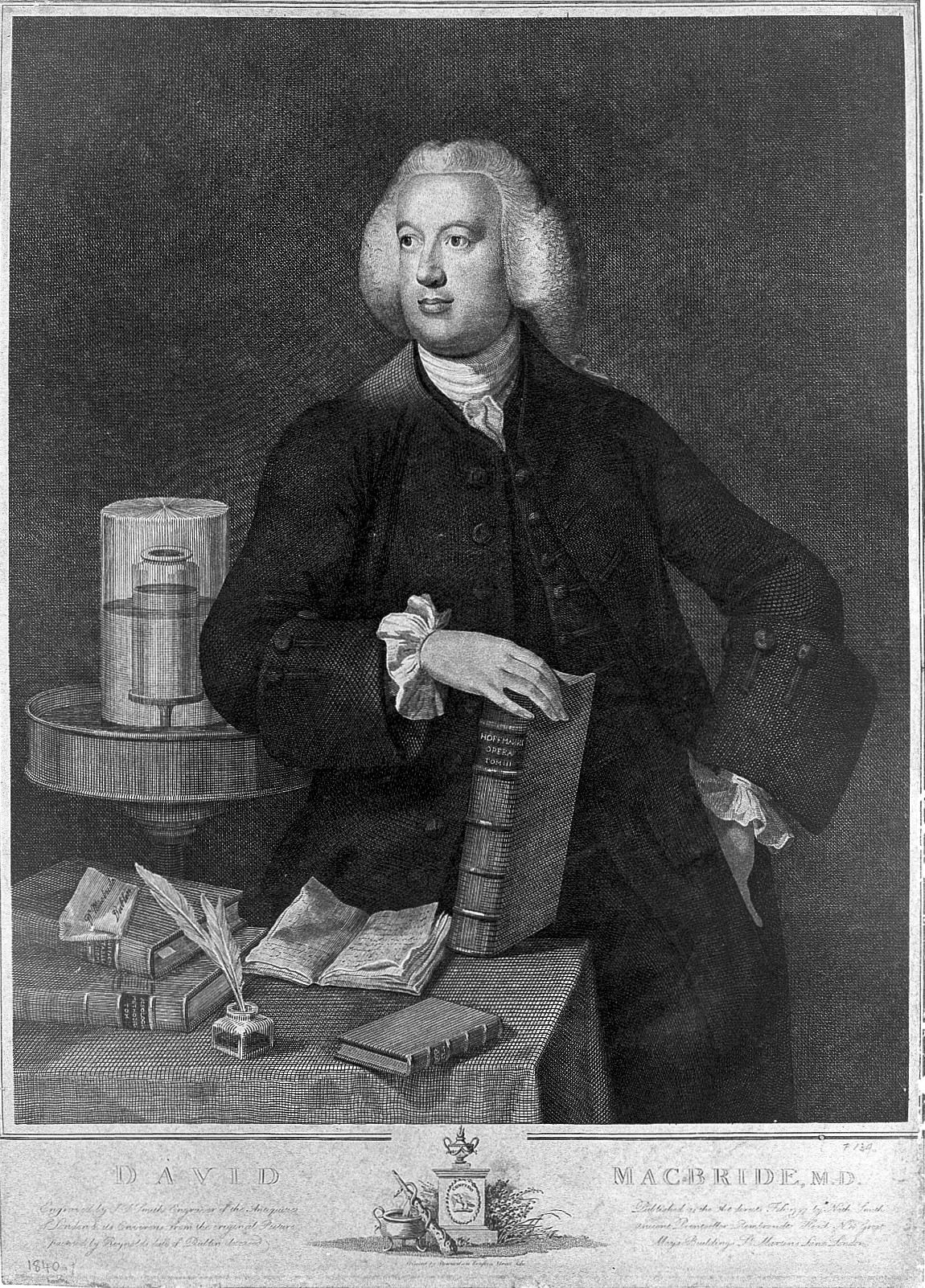
David Macbride

David Macbride (1726–1778) was an Irish medical writer. He is now remembered mainly for his work on the treatment of scurvy.

== Life ==
Born at Ballymoney, County Antrim, 26 April 1726, he was the son of Robert McBride, Presbyterian minister there, and brother of John MacBride; his mother's name before marriage was Boyd. He was educated at the village school, and apprenticed to a local surgeon.

Macbride was for a short time surgeon's mate on a hospital ship and surgeon in the navy, and he acquired an acquaintance with the diseases of seamen which he afterwards turned to advantage. After the peace (1748) he attended lectures on anatomy by Alexander Monro primus in Edinburgh, and, going to London, he heard also William Hunter, on the same subject, and William Smellie on midwifery. In 1749 he returned to Ballymoney, but moved to Dublin in 1751. He joined, and read papers before, the Medico-Philosophical Society there (established in 1756), and after the death of Charles Smith in 1762 he became its secretary.

Until 1764, when the publication of Experimental Essays made his reputation, Macbride had only a small medical practice. The University of Glasgow created him M.D. 27 November 1764, and he prospered. In the winter of 1776–7 he began lecturing on medicine in his own house.

In December 1767 Macbride made a discovery in the art of tanning, advocating the use of lime water in the process. For this he was, on 31 March 1768, made an honorary member of the Dublin Society, which awarded him a silver medal on 14 April following. The Society of Arts of London subsequently gave him a gold medal. On 14 November 1769 he petitioned the Irish House of Commons for aid in developing his invention, and on 19 Nov. a committee was appointed, which reported favourably; no support seems, however, to have been given.

In 1777 Macbride sent over to England by Dr. Morton what was said to be the original of the solemn league and covenant, which he had inherited from his grandfather. In his last years he suffered poor health. He died at his house in Cavendish Row, Dublin, on 28 December 1778; he was buried in St. Audoen's Church there.

== Works ==
Macbride published:

- Experimental Essays, London, 1764; 2nd edit. enlarged, 1767; another edit. 1776. The essay "On the Nature and Properties of Fixed Air" in it to some extent anticipated the discoveries of Henry Cavendish. The book contained the first publication of the gas theories of Joseph Black. Macbride combined Black's ideas with those of Sir John Pringle.
- Historical Account of the New Method of Treating the Scurvy at Sea, London, 1768. In 1762 Macbride communicated his views on the treatment of scurvy to his friend George Cleghorn, through whom they reached William Hunter and Henry Tone, one of the commissioners for taking care of sick and wounded seamen. Macbride advised the use of fresh wort, as used in brewing, and the Lords of the Admiralty ordered trials. Lemon juice, recommended by James Lind in his Treatise on the Scurvy of 1754, in the end prevailed as a treatment; but Macbride's brother John, who was commander of HMS Jason, made an experiment with the cure in a voyage of 1765–7, and the ship's surgeon, Alexander Young, sent his journal to Macbride, who published it as an appendix to the Historical Account. Joseph Priestley's award-winning work on soda water and scurvy drew on Macbride's ideas.
- Introduction to the Theory and Practice of Physic, London, 1772; 2nd and enlarged edit. Dublin, 1776, 2 vols. This work grew out of his lectures; it was translated into Latin, and published at Utrecht in 1774.

He also contributed medical papers to periodicals. His Account of the Improved Method of Tanning Leather was published in Philosophical Transactions for 1778. The Principles of Virtue and Morality was published, Boston, 1796, as part of "The Moral Library".

== Family ==
Macbride married, first, on 20 November 1753, Margaret Armstrong; and secondly, on 5 June 1762, Dorcas, widow of George Cumming. He left no issue.
