= Action of 13 August 1780 =

1780 minor naval battle during the Anglo-French War

- Part of the American Revolutionary War
Date	13 August 1780
Location	Off the Old Head of Kinsale
Result	British victory

Belligerents
Great Britain	France

Commanders and leaders
(Kingdom of Great Britain) John MacBride	(Kingdom of France) Robert Sutton de Clonard

Strength
2 ships: 1 third rate 1 fifth rate	1 Ship of the line Privateer

Casualties and losses
3 killed & 21 wounded	1 ship of the line captured 21 killed & 35 wounded 590 captured

The action of 13 August 1780 was a minor naval battle fought off the Old Head of Kinsale (County Cork, Ireland) in which the 64-gun French "private man of war" (privateer) Comte d'Artois fought two British Royal Navy ships, Bienfaisant and Charon, during the American Revolutionary War.

After Royal Navy admiral George Rodney successfully brought relief to the defenders of Gibraltar, capturing a Spanish convoy off Cape Finisterre and eight days later winning the Battle of Cape St. Vincent, his fleet returned to Britain in March 1780. One of the ships of his fleet, HMS Bienfaisant, under John MacBride, sailed back with them and kept a watch of the Irish coast in order to report if there were any movements by Spanish and French fleets in the area.

Reports arrived in early August 1780 of a large French privateer, the 64-gun Comte d'Artois, which had sailed from Brest to cruise off the Irish south coast, and was at once to be dealt with. MacBride was ordered to sail together with the 44-gun HMS Charon to capture Comte d'Artois. After several days in search of the vessel, a mysterious sail was finally sighted early on 13 August, chasing after some of the ships of a British convoy departing from Cork.

== Comte d'Artois ==
Comte d'Artois was an Indiaman of the French East India Company, launched in 1759. She had been hulked in 1767 to serve as a careening hulk, but in 1780 was sold as a privateer. From May 1780 until the action she cruised under the command of Lieutenant Chevalier Robert Sutton de Closnard (or Clonard).

== Action ==
MacBride ranged up and fell in with the unidentified ship, which hoisted English colours. Both ships came within pistol shot, and it was not until there was some communication between the two ships, that MacBride could be satisfied of her identity. By now the two ships were so close, with Bienfaisant off the Comte d'Artois's bow, that neither ship could bring their main guns to bear. Instead both ships opened fire with muskets until MacBride could manoeuvre away and a general action ensued.

After an hour and ten minutes the French vessel surrendered. She proved to be the Comte D'Artois, a private ship of war, mounting 64 guns, and with a crew of 644 men Closnard's command. Closnard himself was slightly wounded. Of his crew, 21 men were killed and 35 wounded. Bienfaisant had three men killed and 20 wounded. Charon had only joined the action towards the end of the engagement and only had a single man wounded. Two British frigates, Licorne and Hussar, also came up towards the end of the action and so shared in the prize money with Bienfaisant and Charon. The Royal Navy did not take Comte d'Artois into service.

The capture had an unusual sequel, as just over a year later and under a different captain, Bienfaisant captured another privateer, this time named Comtesse d'Artois.
