= Bird, Savage & Bird =

Bird, Savage & Bird, was a firm of London merchants transacting business with North America from about 1782. Manufactured goods were exported to America in exchange for semi-tropical crops, grown in locations such as South Carolina. Later Bird, Savage & Bird became the banking agents in Britain for the U.S. Government. In 1802 the American ambassador to Britain, Rufus King, instructed them to make a routine payment, but they were reluctant to fully comply. This led King to express his concern that their "affairs may not be altogether free of embarrassment", and in early 1803 his fears were realised when the House of Bird, Savage & Bird failed, leaving the United States as major creditors. To replace them, the U.S. Government appointed merchant bankers Francis Baring & Co.

== Background ==
The three partners of Bird, Savage & Bird were American-born Benjamin Savage (domiciled in Britain) and the brothers Henry Merttins Bird (1755–1818) and Robert Bird (1761–1842), from Warwickshire, England.

Savage was descended from New England colonist Major Thomas Savage. He moved to England from South Carolina with his parents in 1776 as the Revolutionary War took hold in America. His father John, who was a Loyalist, later told a Royal Commission that the reason for this move was for the "sake of his son". Within two years of arriving in Britain, Benjamin's mother died, and in 1778 his father remarried to widow Rebecca Sarah (Manning) Hamm. She was the sister of British merchant William Coventry Manning, who traded with the Carolinas and the West Indies. Benjamin was placed with Manning to learn the mercantile business, where he remained for about five years. In a letter written in 1782 by Benjamin Vaughan to Benjamin Franklin, Savage is described as a young man just starting out on his career.

Henry Merttins Bird was also connected to Manning, having married his daughter Elizabeth in 1778, and received some early commercial training from him. Bird's father was a silk manufacturer of Coventry, and his mother was the daughter of John Henry Merttins, a City of London jeweller. When Merttins died in 1776, the conditions of his will benefitted young Henry, who became the lease holder of Valance House in Dagenham. In this same year he joined banker/merchant Anthony Francis Haldimand (1741–1817) in a partnership based at 51, St Mary Ax, in the City of London. The two men also maintained separate business interests.

Haldimand, of Swiss origin, had moved to Britain in 1761 aged twenty as part of an exchange with the son of silk manufacturer Joshua Pickersgill. Between 1765 and 1769 he was a partner in the firm of Zachary, Long & Haldimand, dealing in Italian silks (renamed "Long & Haldimand" in 1766), and in 1768 he married Pickersgill's daughter, Jane. Family links eventually led to the foundation of the bank Morris, Prevost & Co. that absorbed the Haldimand business. Haldimand managed the financial affairs of his uncle, Frederick Haldimand, governor of Quebec, and on his death became his heir.

The third partner in Bird, Savage, & Bird was Robert Bird, the younger brother of Henry Merttins Bird. It is possible that he picked up his early business acumen in India, but by 1782 he was with his brother and Benjamin Savage in the newly formed firm of Bird, Savage & Bird, based in the City of London. Robert married his cousin Lucy Wilberforce Bird in 1786, and they had ten children. Several of these were born in America, where Robert represented the partnership, but where he also registered a business in his own name.

== Family connections ==
The Bird brothers were fortunate in their family connections: one of their uncles was Abel Smith (1717–1788), a prominent figure in the development of the Smith, Payne & Smiths bank. William Coventry Manning's son William married Abel Smith's daughter Elizabeth in 1786. Two of Manning's daughters also married into influential families: Sarah Manning married Benjamin Vaughan (1751–1835), and Martha Weatherell Manning married John Laurens, who was the son of wealthy South Carolina plantation owner and trader Henry Laurens.

== Smiths, DeSaussure and Darrell ==
During the American War of Independence, the British laid siege to Charlestown (present-day Charleston) and interned many of the defenders, including American merchants Josiah Smiths, Daniel DeSaussure and Edward Darrell. After the war these three, with Josiah's cousin George, formed the partnership Smiths, DeSaussure and Darrell that became the largest merchant business in South Carolina. They were also active in the sale of slaves in Charleston jointly with Ball, Jennings & Company. Trading conditions in South Carolina after the war were difficult, recovery was slow, and rebuilding the economy relied on extended credit. Planters in the area had lost thousands of slaves during the British occupation, and replacements from Africa and the West Indies were costly. The market for indigo began to diminish, and there were successive crop failures. Legislation was passed to protect planters who defaulted on repayments. As a consequence, merchants struggled to recover debts, and several failed.

Over the next twenty years Smiths, DeSaussure and Darrell traded across the Atlantic with London-based Bird, Savage & Bird. (Note: Edward Darrell was the brother-in-law of Josiah Smith.) The general arrangements were that goods exported from Britain were sent on terms of credit to South Carolina. Here they were sold to planters plus others via outlets that included J M Verdier in Beaufort and John Cogdell in Georgetown. Return shipments to Britain from South Carolina normally called in at either Falmouth or Cowes before being consigned to final destinations, including exports to the continent.

== War with France ==
In 1793 it became illegal for the British to trade with France due to the declaration of war between the two nations. French privateers were issued with letters of marque that provided them with legitimacy to capture vessels trading with Britain. The ownership of these captured vessels was then decided by an admiralty court. An American-registered ship named Laurens departed South Carolina on 7 February 1793 with a cargo of indigo and rice sent by Smiths, DeSaussure and Darrell and Legare, Theus & Prioleau to London. On 21 March the Laurens was intercepted 15 miles (6 lieues) off Portland by the French privateer, Le Sans Culotte of Honfleur, and taken into the French port of Le Havre. Bird, Savage & Bird were asked to intercede in the dispute, but administrative confusion and conflicts of jurisdiction in France resulted in the vessel being held for over a year; the captain was imprisoned by the authorities, his crew released and his unattended ship started to take on water.

At this time the United States had little in the way of naval protection, apart from United States Revenue Cutter Service. The disruption to the maritime trade caused by privateers led to the Naval Act of 1794 being passed and the commissioning of six frigates. Bird Savage & Bird, as banking agents for the United States in Britain, became involved with procurement of construction materials for these ships, including copper plate and anchors.

== Funding Act of 1790 ==
In 1790, the United States Congress passed fiscal reform legislation based on proposals from Alexander Hamilton, the Secretary to the United States Treasury. These included establishing the Bank of the United States and funding the domestic debt via the sale of securities Bird, Savage & Bird became the biggest trader of these securities on the London market, selling several million dollars' worth. Henry Bird wrote to George Washington offering the services of Bird, Savage & Bird as agents for the Bank of the United States in Britain. He went on to suggest that the house of William [Coventry] Manning Sr, William Manning Jr, & Benjamin Vaughan, known as Mannings & Vaughan, merchants of London, might be considered as an alternative in this role. George Washington replied, via his personal secretary Tobias Lear, on 16 February 1790 informing Bird that:

The President of the United States has received your letter of the 23d of January; offering the services of the Houses of Bird, Savage & Bird—and of Mannings and Vaughn, to act as agents, if such should be wanted in Europe, for the purpose of negotiating a loan—or paying of interest to the European Creditors of the United States. And in obedience to his command I have now to inform you, that your letter has been laid before the Secretary of the Treasury [Alexander Hamilton] for his information, as belonging to his department; but the subject to which it relates has not yet come under the discussion of Congress

— Founders Online; To George Washington from Henry Merttins Bird, 23 January 1790

== Banking agent for US government ==
Although Henry Bird failed to secure a business relationship with the Bank of the United States, he received support from several influential figures in South Carolina. These included references from Ralph Izard and the Honorable William Smith. In addition Charles Cotesworth Pinckney provided Bird with a letter of introduction to George Washington and his brother. Thomas Pinckney, former governor of South Carolina and US ambassador to Britain, promoted the cause for Bird Savage & Bird in a letter to Alexander Hamilton in 1793. Bird, Savage & Bird became a banking/fiscal agent for the US Government in Britain The account was split and included diplomatic funds for the ambassador and his staff; funds for the relief of seamen; treasury accounts and payment for legal costs. The United States fed these accounts using either bills to be collected by Bird, Savage & Bird or US stock, that they were able to sell. Private accounts were also managed, Pinckney being one who took advantage of this service and later John Adams, second president of the United States. He suffered significant losses when Bird Savage & Bird failed in 1803.

== Ira Allen and the Olive Branch affair ==
In 1798 Bird Savage & Bird became involved with the affairs of an American citizen named Ira Allen who had purchased 20,000 captured muskets and a number of cannon (referred to as 21 field pieces) in France for shipment to Vermont in the United States. A large part of the consignment was loaded onto an American ship named Olive Branch in Ostend for deliver to USA. During the voyage the Olive Branch was intercepted in the Atlantic by HMS Audacious under the command of Captain Davidge Gould. Discrepancies with the paperwork led to the Olive Branch being taken back to Portsmouth by the British for further investigation. Allen, who had been a passenger on the Olive Branch, claimed that the shipment of weapons was for the sole use of the Vermont militia. He argued that the transaction had complied with the terms of the newly signed Jay Treaty and the cargo should be released and allowed to continue to Vermont. The British had unsatisfactory dealings with Allen and his brothers some years before (referred to as the Haldimand Affair) and now viewed him with suspicion They counter claimed that the shipment was destined for Ireland to help start a rebellion against Britain. Allen was imprisoned in Britain, but later released on bail to allow him to travel back to France to obtain documents to corroborate his version of events. His bail of £2000 was provided by Bird, Savage & Bird in exchange for the cargo of muskets. These were transported to New York and offered for sale by Robert Bird, but their condition had deteriorated, and further costs were incurred to clean the weapons before they could be marketed. It also became evident that the valuation placed on these guns had been optimistic.

Meanwhile, Allen's trip to France had not gone well. He was imprisoned by the authorities and it was two years before he was allowed to leave the country. His dispute with Britain continued for several years, and although he was eventually cleared of the charges, he died in poverty having failed to obtain compensation. His claim that the weapons were purchased on behalf of the Vermont militia was also challenged. It appears that he intended to use the guns as part of a conspiracy with the French government to incite a rebellion in Lower Canada, and create an independent republic of Quebec.

Bird, Savage & Bird continued to advertise the muskets for sale. In 1801 Allen believed that he had found a potential buyer. A slave rebellion had taken place in Virginia in 1800. The governor of the state, James Monroe, expressed interest in Allen's muskets and sent his agent to carry out an inspection. This followed the passing of An ACT to arm the militia of certain towns, passed on January 21, 1801, in which the General Assembly directed the governor to issue arms to the militias of specific towns. In 1803 Bird, Savage and Bird were declared bankrupt and guns still in their New York warehouse became the property of the assignees/administrators.

== Bankruptcy ==
In 1803 Bird, Savage and Bird were declared bankrupt. Henry Bird had tried to buy time by taking short-term loans from friends and family in 1802. These included William Manning, and his partners John Proctor Anderdon and Charles Bosanquet, John Savage (Benjamin's father), Harvey Christian Combe and John Collins, who each signed promissory notes for £6000, plus Maurice Swabey for £3000 (Swabey was husband of Henry Bird's sister Catherine). When Bird's mother died in February 1804 it was also revealed that her estate was due repayment of a £6900 “bond debt” from the partnership of Bird, Savage & Bird.

The reason for the failure was summarised in a letter to Ira Allen:

Bird, Savage and Bird must suspend payments due to repeated disappointments in the receipt of remittances on large debts in America and the West Indies; if debts were paid it would enable them to pay every creditor in full and leave a surplus.

— Letter from Bird, Savage & Bird to Ira Allen 7 February 1803

One of these large debts was $70,000 owed by George and Josiah Smith of Smiths, DeSaussure and Darrell. This had still not been recovered by 1825 when a compromise was agreed reducing the amount to $20,000.

Later that year Robert Bird was also declared bankrupt in the United States and this led to jurisdiction issues between assignees in the two countries. In March 1804 both Henry Bird and Benjamin Savage obtained their certificate's of discharge from bankruptcy, and in 1808 the partnership was dissolved.

Francis Baring was appointed in 1803 to replaced Bird, Savage & Bird as financial agent for the United States government in Britain. Later that year Baring and Henry Hope became involved with the negotiations for the Louisiana Purchase on behalf of the U.S. Government, acquired from the French in late 1803.

== Final years ==
=== Henry Merttins Bird ===
In 1803 Henry Merttins Bird sold the lease on his Valence House property and a farm in Dagenham called Edolph's Lands. However, he retained his links to the Bird family properties in Barton-on-the-Heath, Warwickshire including the manor Barton House. Henry Merttin Bird died in 1818 and his wife Elizabeth died in 1817. Just before his death Henry put his livestock up for sale, indicating that he was moving abroad and that the house was available to let. There were no children from Henry and Elizabeth's marriage and Barton House and manor transferred to the ownership of Henry's brother Robert. He let the property to Frederick Charles Acton Colvile, and lived until his death (1842) in Taplow. Colvile, who was married to Mary Leigh, sister of Chandos Leigh, 1st Baron Leigh and cousin to Jane Austen, remained at Barton House for many years. Mary Leigh's family home of Adlestrop is just a few miles from Barton-on-the-Heath.

=== Benjamin Savage ===
Benjamin Savage died at some date before 1828. He married Elizabeth Dunn, daughter of James Dunn, in 1794. They had seven children, the first child, John, was born in 1795. He became a barrister, the master of the Supreme Court of Madras and in 1857 was appointed the High Sheriff of Kent.

=== John Savage ===
Benjamin Savage's father, John, died in his London home of Brompton Grove (Kensington) in 1804 aged 89. He was born on the 4 November 1715 in Southampton Parish, Bermuda, where his father was a jeweller/goldsmith. He moved to South Carolina at an early age and started a business with his brother Benjamin that became the second largest merchant organisation in Charleston. In 1748 he married widow Ann (Scott) Allen who on the death of her first husband had become the owner of Snee Farm. In 1754 the Savages sold Snee Farm to Colonel Charles Pinckney. In 1773 John Savage was elected the first president of the Charleston Chamber of Commerce. Being a loyalist, he was proscribed, banished and his property in South Carolina confiscated at the start of the American War of Independence. He managed to retain much of his wealth and moved to London in 1775 where he lived in comfort, being mentioned in the journals of Samuel Curwen, who visited him for tea on many occasions.

=== Robert Bird ===
Robert Bird retired to Taplow, Buckinghamshire, England, where he died in 1842. He married his second cousin Lucy Wilberforce Bird in 1786; they had ten children. Lucy's mother was Judith Wilberforce; her brother Robert Wilberforce, had married Robert Bird's aunt, Elizabeth Bird, whose son was the antislavery campaigner William Wilberforce.

== Bibliography ==
- Burke, Bernard (1863). A Genealogical and Heraldic Dictionary of the Landed Gentry of Great Britain and Ireland. Harrison. p. 1334.
- Cope, Sydney Raymond (1981). Bird, Savage & Bird of London Merchants and Bankers, 1782 to 1803 (Vol. IV, No. 4 ed.). London: Guildhall Studies in London History.
- Curwen, Samuel; Oliver, Andrew (1972). The journal of Samuel Curwen, loyalist Volume 1. Harvard University Press. pp. Various.
- Davies, Edward J (2012). Some Connections of the Birds of Warwickshire (Vol. 26, No.1 ed.). Sausalito CA: The Genealogist: American Society of Genealogists.
- Jarvis, Michael J (2010). In the Eye of All Trade Bermuda, Bermudians, and the Maritime Atlantic World, 1680-1783. Omohundro Institute and University of North Carolina Press. p. 337. ISBN 9780807895887.
- McMillin, James A (2004). The final victims : foreign slave trade to North America, 1783-1810. Columbia: University of South Carolina Press. pp. 77–80. ISBN 9781570035463.
- Rogers, George C. (1962). Evolution of a Federalist: William Loughton Smith of Charleston. Columbia: University of South Carolina Press. p. 99.
- Rowland, Lawrence S; Moore, Alexander; Rogers, George C (1996). The History of Beaufort County. Columbia SC: University of South Carolina Press. ISBN 1-57003-090-1.
- Waters(1), Henry F (1913). The New England historical and genealogical register (LXVII ed.). Boston: The Society. p. 308.
- Waters(2), Henry F (1913). The New England historical and genealogical register (LXVII ed.). Boston: The Society. p. 319.
- Wells, Louisa Susannah (1906). The journal of a voyage from Charlestown, S. C., to London, undertaken during the American revolution by a daughter of an eminent American loyalist. New York Historical Society. p. 112.
