= John MacBride (Royal Navy officer) =

Royal Navy officer and politician (1735–1800)

Admiral John MacBride
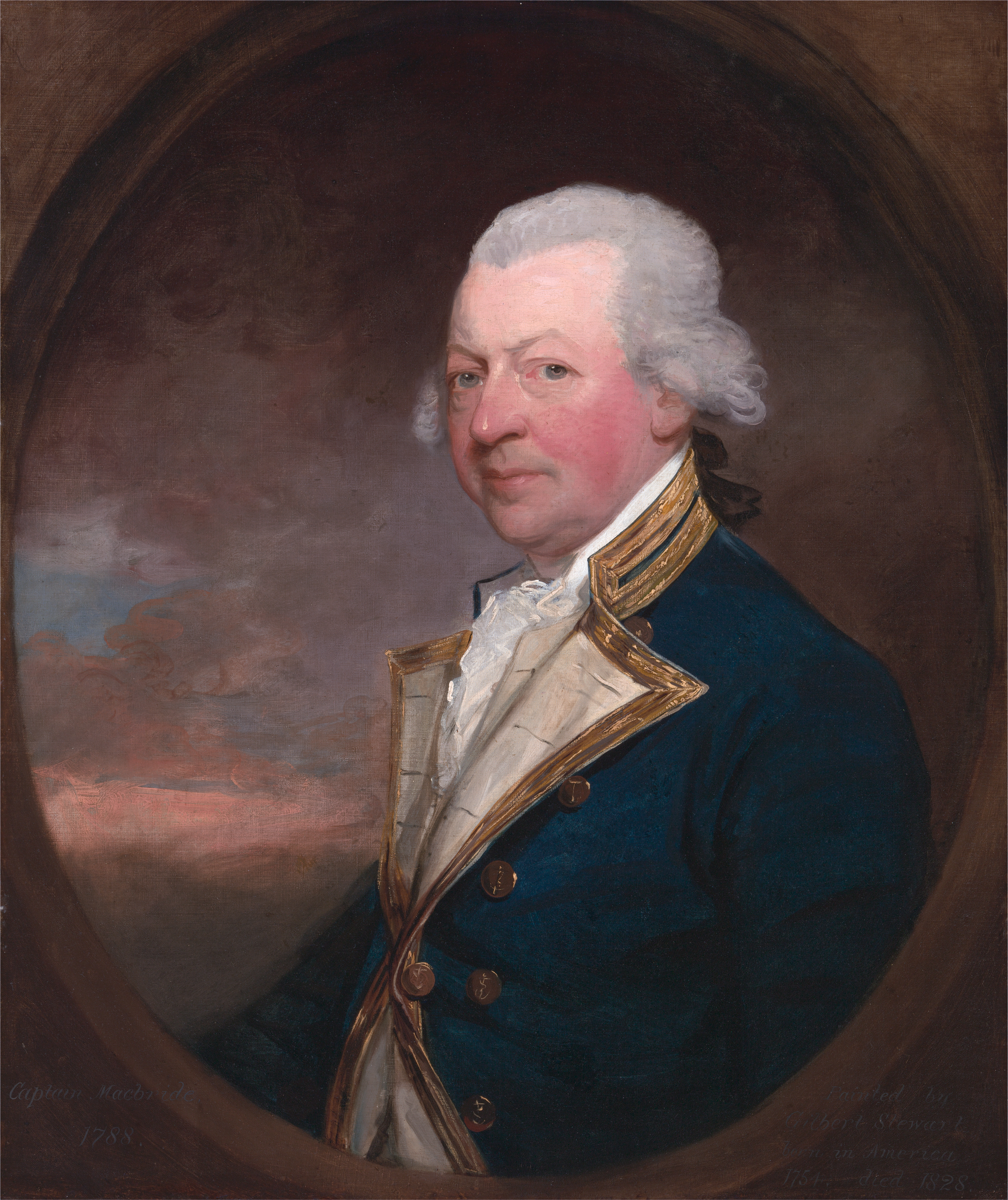
- Portrait by Gilbert Stuart, 1788
- Born: c. 1735; Scotland
- Died: 17 February 1800 (aged 64–65); London, England
- Military career
- Allegiance: Great Britain
- Branch: Royal Navy
- Service years: 1754–1800
- Rank: Admiral of the Blue
- Commands: Grace; HMS Grampus; HMS Cruizer; HMS Renown; HMS Jason; HMS Seaford; HMS Arethusa; HMS Southampton; HMS Orpheus; HMS Bienfaisant; HMS Artois; HMS Druid; HMS Cumberland; The Downs
- Conflicts: Seven Years' War; American War of Independence; Battle of Ushant (1778); Battle of Cape St. Vincent (1780); Great Siege of Gibraltar; Fourth Anglo–Dutch War; Battle of Dogger Bank (1781); French Revolutionary Wars

Admiral of the Blue John MacBride (c. 1735 – 17 February 1800) was a Royal Navy officer and politician who served in the Seven Years' War, American War of Independence and French Revolutionary Wars.

MacBride entered the navy after serving on merchant vessels and distinguished himself in a number of actions during the Seven Years' War, including cutting out a privateer, which secured him the rank of post-captain by the end of the conflict. He was instrumental in establishing and securing a British settlement on the Falkland Islands in the years of peace which followed, and also performed service to the Royal Family by transporting the King's sister, Caroline Matilda. Still in active service by the outbreak of war with the American colonies, MacBride took command of a ship of the line and saw action in engagements under Keppel and Rodney. He was also active against privateers, capturing the Comte d'Artois in a heated battle off the Irish coast. Further service followed with Parker's fleet against the Dutch and with Barrington in the Channel.

MacBride ended the war serving ashore in Ireland, and in 1784 embarked on a political career, becoming MP for Plymouth. Promoted to flag rank with the outbreak of war with Revolutionary France, he commanded squadrons off the enemy coasts, and transported troops to support land operations on the continent. His last active service was in 1795, though he was promoted to Admiral of the Blue shortly before his death in 1800.

== Family and early life ==
John MacBride was born in Scotland around 1735, the second son of the Presbyterian minister Robert MacBride. The MacBrides moved to Ireland shortly after John's birth, when Robert became minister of Ballymoney, in County Antrim. John's brother, David MacBride, became a noted medical writer. John MacBride initially went to sea with the merchant service in 1751, and joined the navy as an able seaman three years later, in 1754. He served first aboard the 24-gun HMS Garland in the West Indies for a number of years, before returning to British wars and serving aboard HMS Norfolk, the flagship in the Downs for a few months.

MacBride passed his lieutenant's examination on 6 October 1758, and received his commission on 27 October. He was moved into the hired cutter Grace, and in August 1761 came across a French privateer anchored in the Dunkirk roadstead. MacBride made contact with the frigate HMS Maidstone and asked her captain for four armed and manned boats. Maidstone's captain readily agreed, and at 10 o'clock that night the boats left the British ships and approached the privateer with muffled oars. They came within pistol shot and hailed the French vessel, and on receiving no reply, boarded her. The British boarded on both sides of the vessel, and carried the ship with two men wounded. MacBride himself shot and killed the French lieutenant as he aimed a gun at the British boat. The total French losses were two dead and five wounded. Having secured the vessel, the British took her out to sea under the guns of a French battery.

MacBride's good service brought him a promotion to master and commander on 7 April 1762, and an appointment to command the fireship HMS Grampus. From there he moved to command the sloop HMS Cruizer on 27 May 1763, still at the rank of commander. After some time spent on the Home station, MacBride received a promotion to post-captain on 20 June 1765, and took command of the 30-gun HMS Renown. This was followed in August 1765 with command of the 32-gun HMS Jason, and a mission to establish a colony on the Falkland Islands.

== Falkland Islands ==
MacBride arrived with Jason, HMS Carcass and the storeship HMS Experiment, in January 1766, with orders to secure a settlement and to inform any existing inhabitants that the islands were a British possession. The British consolidated Port Egmont, made several cruises in the surrounding waters, and in December came across the French settlement. In a cordial meeting MacBride informed the French governor M. de Neville of the British claim, which the French politely rejected. Unbeknownst to both de Neville and MacBride, Louis Antoine de Bougainville, who had established the French settlement, had agreed to sell the colony to Spain. The resulting tensions between the Spanish and British claims would nearly lead to war in 1770, but in the meantime MacBride returned home, reporting the situation to the government. He later published a 13-page monograph, probably in 1770, entitled A Journal of the Winds and Weather...at Falkland Islands from 1 February 1766 to 19 January 1767.

== Interwar years ==
After his return to Britain MacBride was given command of the 22-gun HMS Seaford in August 1767 and employed to cruise in the English Channel. He spent several years aboard Seaford, before transferring to take command of the 32-gun HMS Arethusa in March 1771, followed by the 32-gun HMS Southampton in August that year. He was in command of Southampton in May 1772 when he received orders to command a small squadron tasked with transporting Caroline Matilda, former Queen of Denmark and Norway and sister of King George III, from Elsinore to Stadt. The squadron consisted of Southampton, and two of MacBride's former commands, Seaford, and Cruizer. In April 1773 he took command of HMS Orpheus.

== American War of Independence ==
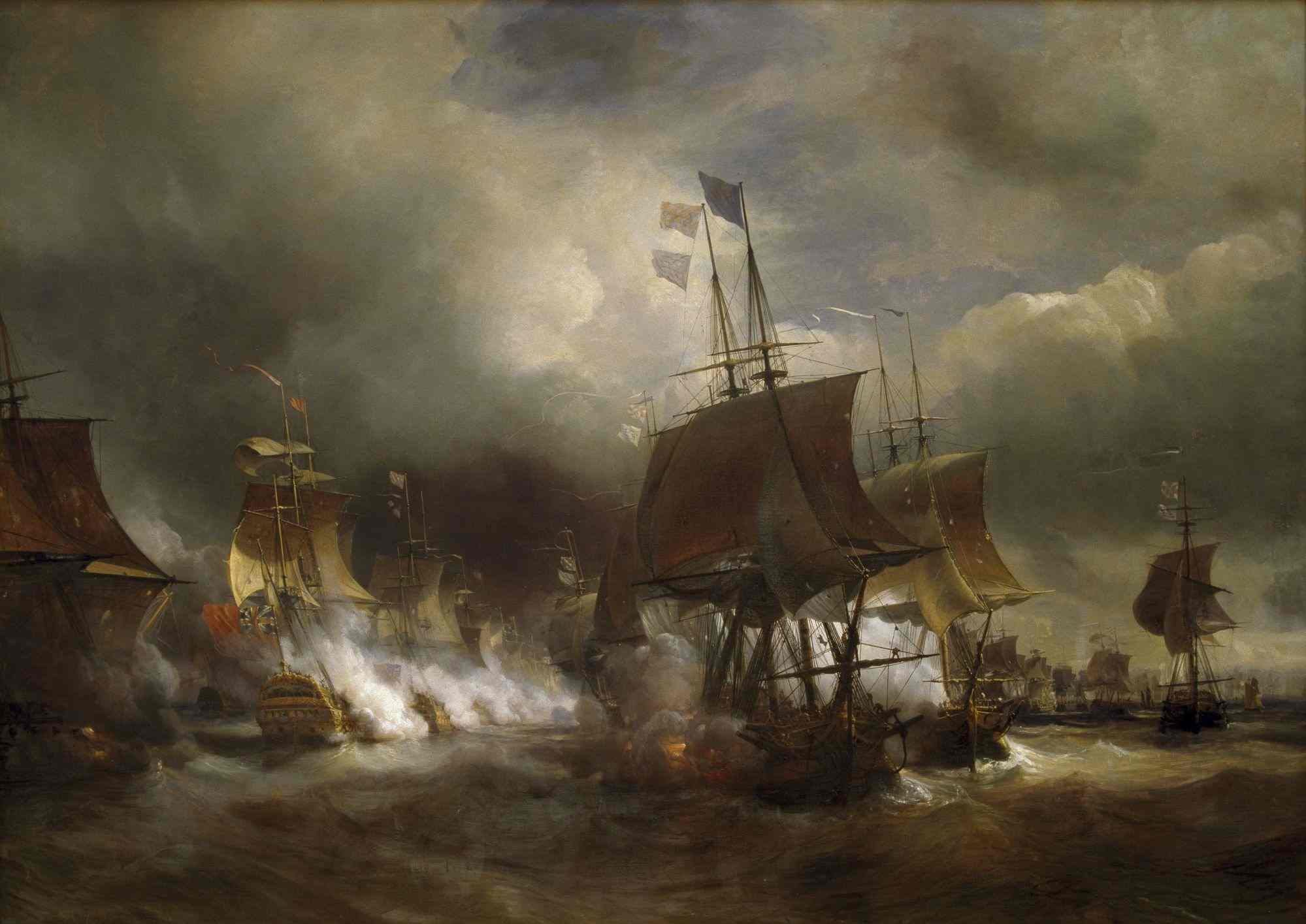
The Battle of Ushant. MacBride saw little actual fighting in the confused engagement.

With the outbreak of war with the American colonies, MacBride was appointed to take command of the 64-gun HMS Bienfaisant on 6 November 1776. He was present at the Battle of Ushant on 28 July 1778, but did not become heavily engaged in the confused action. In the ensuing argument over the outcome of the battle, MacBride gave evidence in favour of Admiral Keppel that was an important factor in Keppel's acquittal at his court-martial. MacBride was less supportive of Sir Hugh Palliser. He remained in command of Bienfaisant, and in December joined Sir George Rodney's fleet to relieve Gibraltar. During the voyage the British fleet came across a Spanish convoy transporting naval stores from San Sebastián to Cádiz, and engaged it. The British succeeded in capturing the convoy, while MacBride distinguished himself in engaging the Spanish flagship Guipuscoana, which surrendered to him.

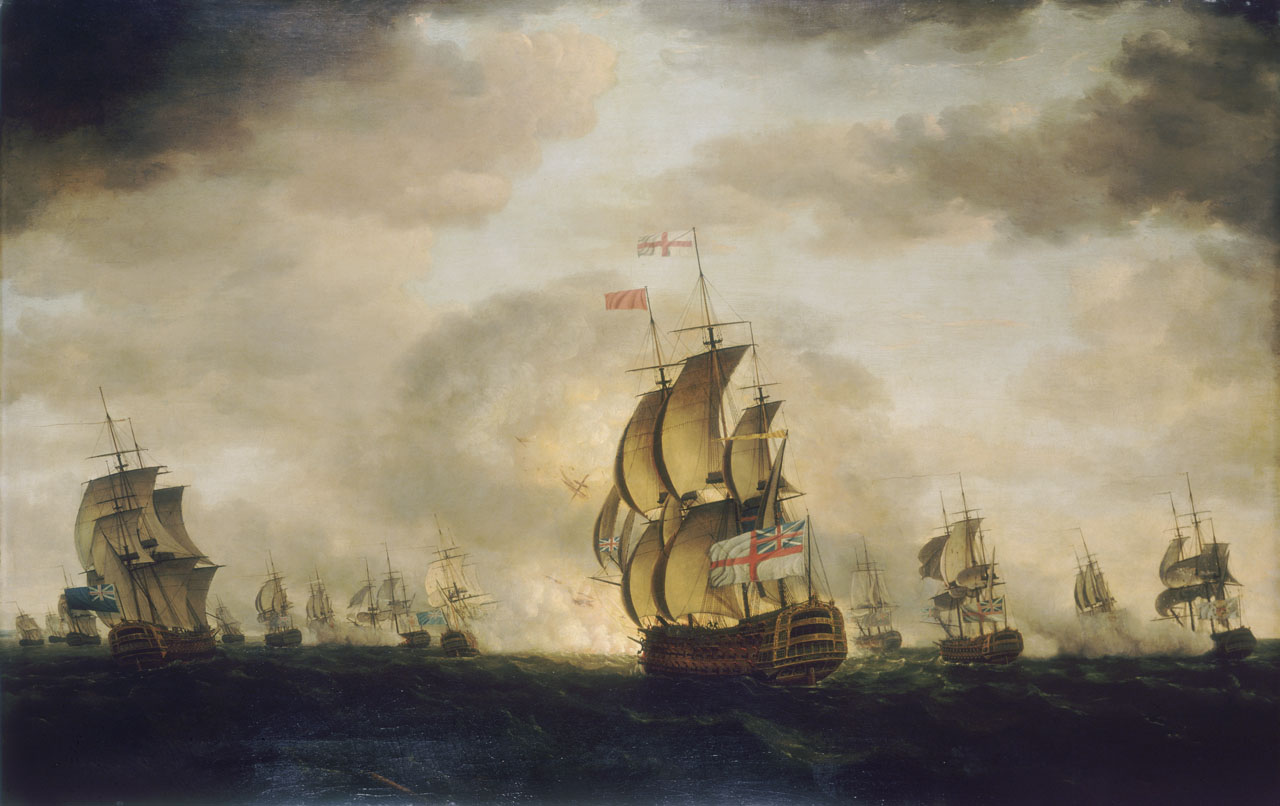
The moonlight Battle off Cape St Vincent, 16 January 1780 by Francis Holman, painted 1780 shows the Santo Domingo exploding. MacBride had been heavily engaged with her just prior to her destruction.

On 16 January the fleet again encountered Spanish ships, this time off Cape St. Vincent. The Spanish fleet, under Admiral Juan de Lángara, were engaged in the Battle of Cape St. Vincent, and again MacBride was in the thick of the action. He took his ship in to engage the San Domingo, with the Bienfaisant narrowly escaping significant damage after her opponent blew up. He then went on to chase down and capture Lángara's flagship, the 80-gun Fenix. MacBride sent Lieutenant Thomas Louis aboard to take possession, but as a smallpox outbreak was raging on the Bienfaisant, MacBride did not take the usual step of transferring some of the captured officers and men aboard his own ship. Instead he reached an agreement with de Lángara, that should the ships encounter a French or Spanish force, he would allow the Fenix to be defended against them. If the Bienfaisant escaped but the Fenix was retaken, de Lángara and his men would consider themselves to still be prisoners of war, but if Fenix escaped and Bienfaisant was taken, then de Lángara and his men would be freed. In any event both ships made it to Gibraltar without incident, after which MacBride was given the honour of taking Rodney's despatches back to Britain. MacBride set off at once, but was delayed by adverse winds. Consequently, his despatches arrived several days after an identical set had reached London, delivered by Captain Edward Thomson, who had left Rodney later than MacBride, but who had had a faster voyage.

=== MacBride and the Artois connection ===
Rodney's fleet returned to Britain in March, and MacBride rejoined the Bienfaisant. In early August a large French privateer, the 64-gun Comte d'Artois, was reported to have sailed from Brest to cruise off the Irish south coast. MacBride was ordered to sail in company with the 44-gun HMS Charon and to capture the dangerous vessel. After several days in search of the vessel, a mysterious sail was finally sighted early on 13 August, chasing after some of the ships of a convoy departing from Cork. MacBride ranged up and fell in with the unidentified ship, which hoisted British colours. Both ships came within pistol shot, and it was not until there was some communication between the two ships, that MacBride could be satisfied of her identity. By now the two ships were so close, with Bienfaisant off the Comte de'Artois's bow, that neither ship could bring their main guns to bear. Instead both ships opened fire with muskets until MacBride could manoeuvre away and a general action ensued. After an hour and ten minutes the French vessel surrendered, having had 21 killed and 35 wounded, while Bienfaisant had three killed and 20 wounded. The Charon had only joined the action towards the end of the engagement and had a single man wounded. The capture had an unusual sequel, for just over a year later, and under a different captain, Bienfaisant captured another privateer, this time named Comtesse d'Artois.

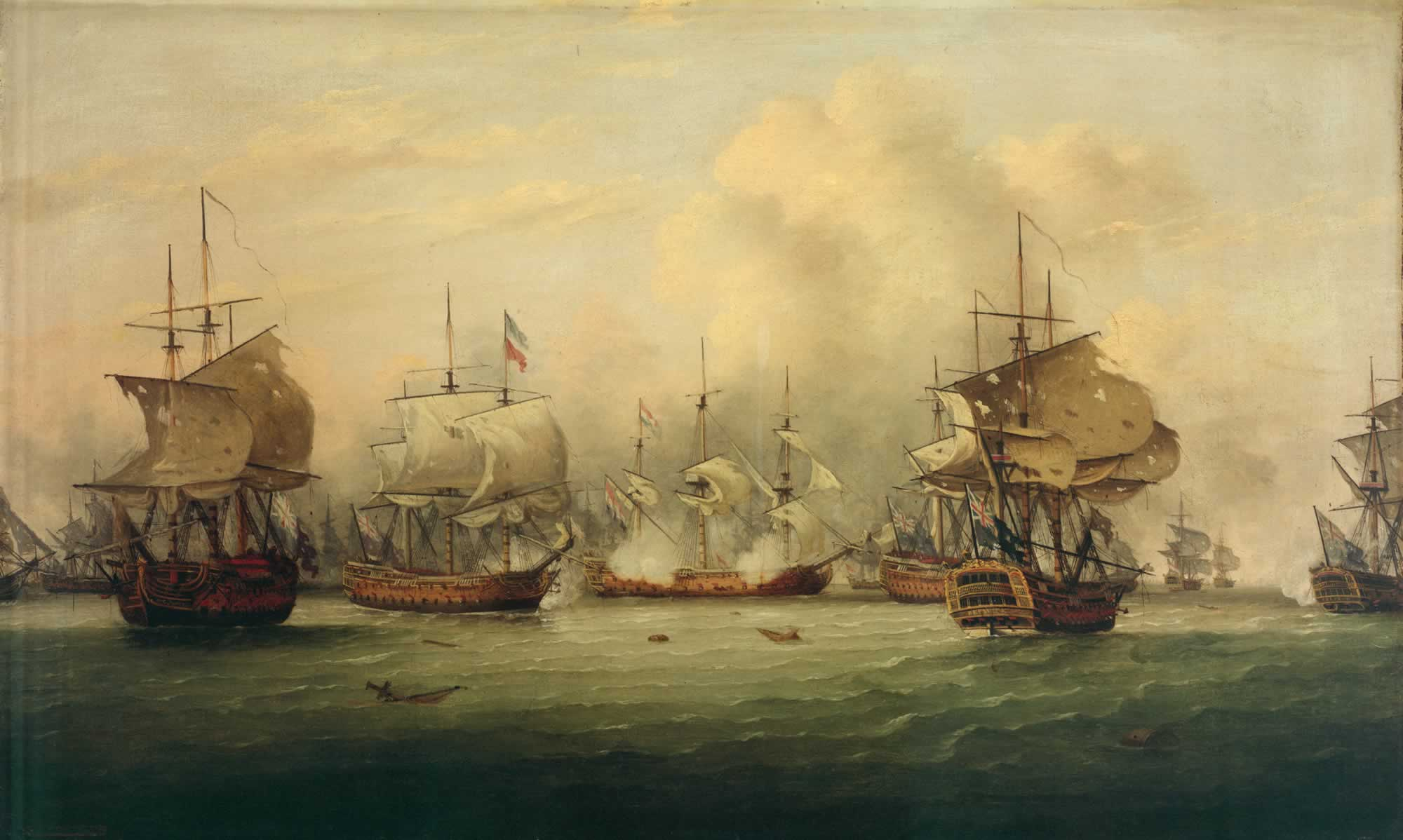
The Battle of Dogger Bank, 5 August 1781

In a further coincidence MacBride was appointed in January 1781 to command the 40-gun HMS Artois, a former French ship captured in 1780 by HMS Romney. MacBride served in the North Sea with Sir Hyde Parker's fleet, and fought against the Dutch at the Battle of Dogger Bank on 5 August 1781. After the battle Parker temporarily moved MacBride into the 80-gun HMS Princess Amelia, whose captain, John MacCartney, had been killed during the battle. MacBride resumed command of Artois after the fleet's return to port, and continued to cruise in the North Sea. On 3 December he engaged and captured two large 24-gun Dutch privateers, the Hercules and Mars. Nine men were killed and fifteen wounded on Mars, while 13 were killed and 20 wounded on Hercules. Artois had one man killed and six wounded.

By 1782 MacBride was operating in the Channel, and in April was sent out as a scout ahead of the main force under Admiral Samuel Barrington, which aimed to intercept a French squadron that had left Brest bound for the East Indies. He sighted the force on 20 April and alerted Barrington. The British moved in and that day and the following captured over half of the French force. After this success MacBride was appointed to the Irish station in June, where he worked in the impress service while Artois cruised under her first lieutenant.

== Years of peace ==
At the end of the war with America, MacBride left the Artois, but in June was able to obtain command of the 32-gun HMS Druid. He commanded her until the end of the year, after which he was temporarily unemployed at sea. MacBride took this opportunity to enter politics, and in 1784 he was elected as MP for Plymouth, holding the seat until 1790. He gave several speeches on naval matters, and sat on the Duke of Richmond's commission into the defences of Portsmouth and Plymouth between 1785 and 1786. He opposed a plan for fortifying the naval dockyards, both on the commission and in parliament. In 1788 he returned to an active, though not a seagoing command, when he took over the Plymouth guardship, the 74-gun HMS Cumberland. By 1790, with the threat of the Spanish Armament looming, MacBride took Cumberland to Torbay to join the fleet assembling there under Lord Howe.

== French Revolutionary Wars ==
MacBride was promoted to Rear-Admiral of the Blue on 1 February 1793, as part of the general promotion following the outbreak of war. He became Commander-in-Chief on the Downs Station, commanding a frigate squadron with his flag in Cumberland, later transferring his flag to the 32-gun HMS Quebec. He took possession of Ostend after the French retreat in early 1793, and in October transported reinforcements under General Sir Charles Grey to assist in the defence of Dunkirk. He took command of the 36-gun HMS Flora at the end of the year and sailed from Portsmouth on 1 December carrying an army under the Earl of Moira to support French royalists in Brittany and Normandy.

Following this service he took command of a small squadron in the Western Approaches, flying his flag in a number of different vessels, including the sloop HMS Echo, the 74-gun HMS Minotaur and the 64-gun HMS Sceptre. The squadron did not achieve any significant successes, and MacBride had the misfortune to break his leg while mounting his horse, forcing him to temporarily relinquish his duties. He was promoted to Rear-Admiral of the Red on 11 April 1794 and on 4 July to Vice-Admiral of the Blue. Promoted to Vice-Admiral of the White on 1 June 1795, MacBride became commander of the squadron in the North Sea assigned to watch the Dutch fleet in the Texel, flying his flag in the 74-gun HMS Russell. He stepped down from the post in late 1795, and was not actively employed at sea again. He was promoted to Admiral of the Blue on 14 February 1799. Admiral John MacBride died of a paralytic seizure at the Spring Garden Coffee House, London on 17 February 1800.

== Family and issue ==
MacBride married early in his career, but no details are known, other than that his wife was the daughter of a naval officer. She is presumed to have died, for MacBride married Ursula Folkes, eldest daughter of William Folkes of Hillington Hall, Norfolk on 14 July 1774. Their son, John David MacBride, became principal of Magdalen Hall, Oxford. MacBride's daughter, Charlotte, married Admiral Willoughby Lake in 1795.

== Bibliography ==
- Armstrong, Patrick; Forbes, Vivian; Schofield, Clive H. (1997). The Falkland Islands and their adjacent maritime area. IBRU. ISBN 978-1-897643-26-6.
- Beatson, Robert (1804). Naval and Military Memoirs of Great Britain, from 1727 to 1783. Vol. 6. Longman, Hurst, Rees and Orme.
- Campbell, John (1818). Naval History of Great Britain: Including the History and Lives of the British Admirals. Vol. 7. Baldwyn and Co.
- Charnock, John (1798). Biographia Navalis; or, Impartial Memoirs of the Lives ... of Officers of the Navy of Great Britain from ... 1660. Vol. 6. London: R. Fauldner.
- Colledge, J. J.; Warlow, Ben (2006) [1969]. Ships of the Royal Navy: The Complete Record of All Fighting Ships of the Royal Navy from the 15th Century to the Present (3rd Rev ed.). London: Chatham Publishing. ISBN 978-1-86176-281-8. OCLC 67375475.
- Laughton, J. K. (1893). "MacBride, John (d. 1800)". Oxford Dictionary of National Biography. Vol. 34. Oxford University Press..
- Tracy, Nicholas (2006). Who's who in Nelson's Navy: 200 Naval Heroes. London: Chatham Publishing. ISBN 1-86176-244-5.
- Wheeler, Tony (2004). The Falklands & South Georgia Island. London: Lonely Planet. ISBN 978-1-74059-643-5.
- Winfield, Rif (2007). British Warships of the Age of Sail 1714–1792: Design, Construction, Careers and Fates. London: Seaforth. ISBN 978-1-86176-295-5.

Parliament of Great Britain
Preceded by Sir Frederick Leman Rogers; George Darby	Member of Parliament for Plymouth; 1784–1790; With: Robert Fanshawe	Succeeded by Sir Frederick Leman Rogers; Alan Gardner
Military offices
Preceded by Vacant	Commander-in-Chief, The Downs; 1793–1794	Succeeded by Joseph Peyton
