= Robert Stopford (Royal Navy officer) =

Royal Navy officer (1768–1847)

Admiral The Honourable Sir Robert Stopford GCB GCMG
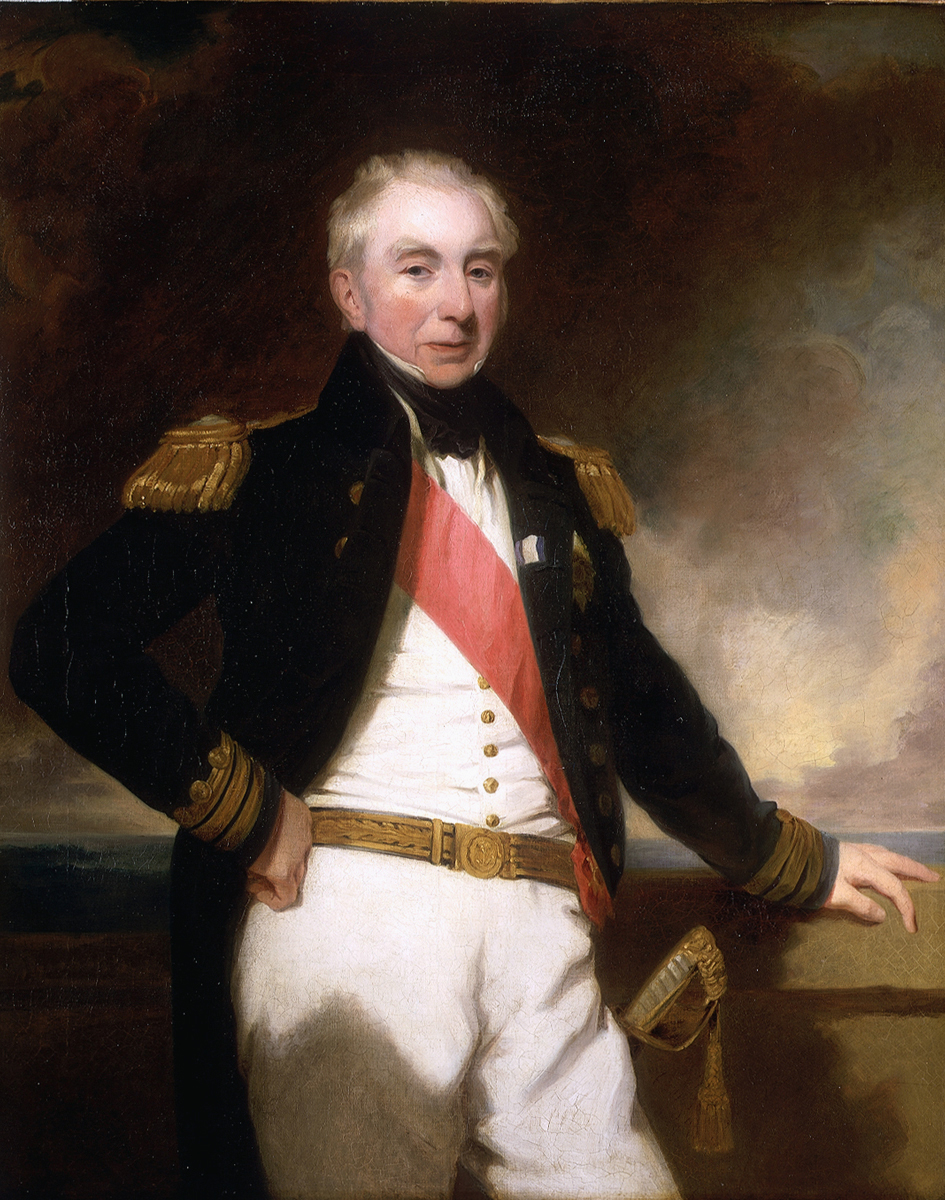
- Portrait by Frederick Richard Say, c. 1840
- Born: 5 February 1768
- Died: 25 June 1847 (aged 79)
- Military career
- Allegiance: United Kingdom
- Branch: Royal Navy
- Rank: Admiral
- Commands: Leeward Islands Station; Cape of Good Hope Station; Portsmouth Command; Greenwich Hospital
- Conflicts: French Revolutionary Wars; Napoleonic Wars; Syrian War
- Awards: Knight Grand Cross of the Order of the Bath; Knight Grand Cross of the Order of St Michael and St George

Admiral Sir Robert Stopford GCB GCMG (5 February 1768 – 25 June 1847) was a Royal Navy officer and politician whose career spanned over 60 years, from the French Revolutionary Wars to the Egyptian–Ottoman War.

== Naval career ==
Stopford was the third son of James Stopford, 2nd Earl of Courtown, and his wife Mary (née Powys). He joined the Royal Navy in 1780 and became a Lieutenant in 1785. Commander Stopford was captain of Ferret between December 1789 and October 1790. In 1790 he was promoted to Post Captain at the age of 22 and was briefly captain of HMS Lowestoffe.

Stopford fought at the Battle of the Glorious First of June in 1794, commanding the frigate HMS Aquilon (32). During the battle Aquilon had the task of standing off and repeating the signals from the flagship. Aquilon also towed the Marlborough out of the line of fire when she was dismasted, for which Lord Howe thanked him personally. One of Stopford's officers on Aquilon was Francis Beaufort, the inventor of the Beaufort Wind-Scale.

On 10 March 1796, Stopford was captain of the fifth rate frigate HMS Phaeton, of 38 guns, when she engaged and captured the 20-gun French corvette Bonne Citoyenne of Cape Finisterre. Stopford took her back to England as his prize. The Royal Navy then bought her in as HMS Bonne Citoyenne, a sixth rate sloop of war. During his service in the Channel, Phaeton captured in all some 13 privateers and three vessels of war, as well as recovering numerous vessels that the French had taken.

In 1799, Stopford was appointed captain of the 74-gun third rate HMS Excellent in the Channel Fleet. He sailed Excellent to the West Indies where he hoisted a commodore's pennant and served for eight months as the Commander-in-Chief of the Leeward Islands Station in 1802.

In 1803, Stopford became captain of the ship of the line HMS Spencer (74), in Horatio Nelson's fleet.

He became a Colonel of Marines in November 1805 and received a gold medal for his conduct at the Battle of San Domingo in 1806, while still in command of Spencer. Stopford was wounded during the battle; he recovered, but the wound would plague him for the rest of his life.

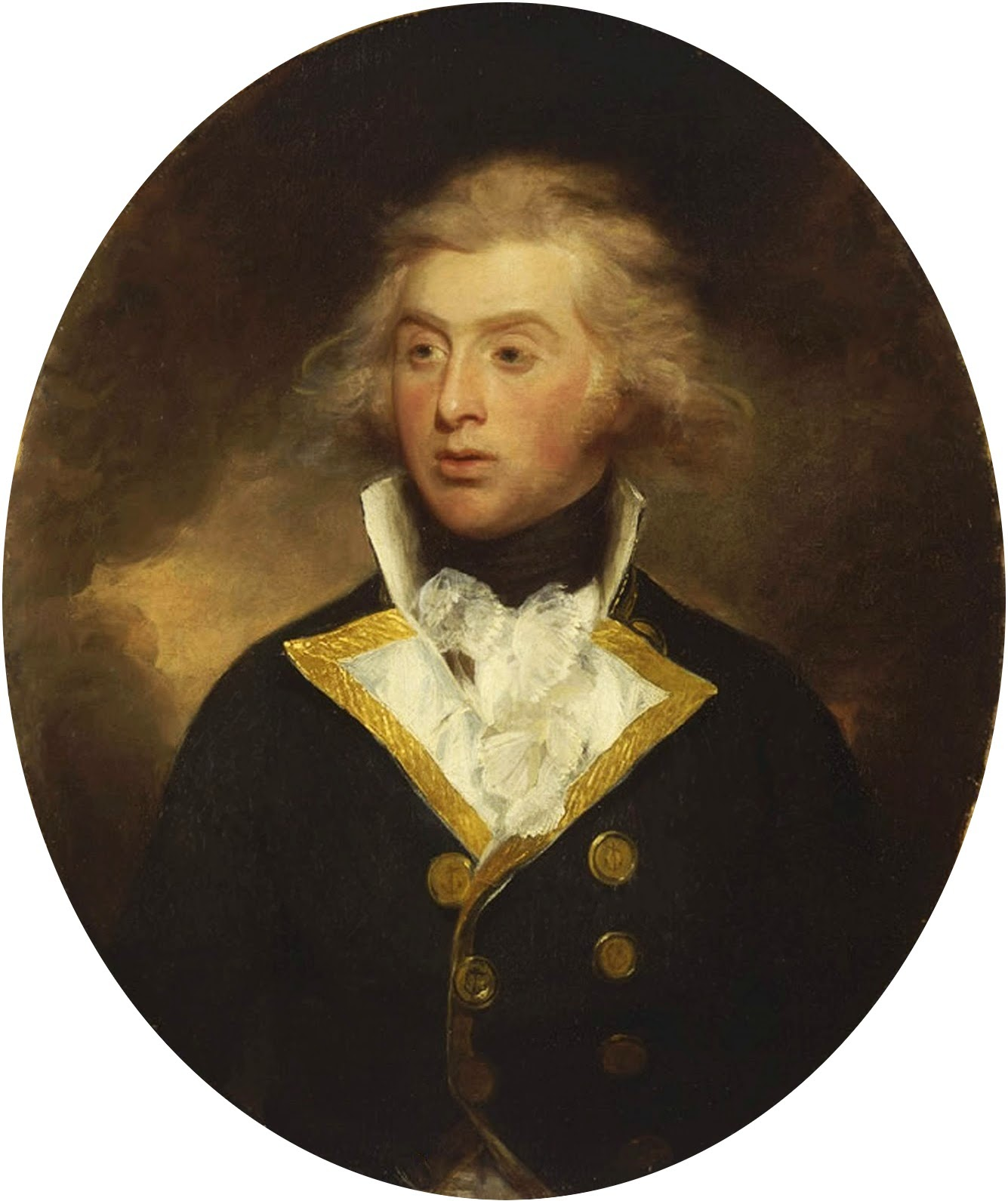
Robert Stopford, c.1790-91, by Henry William Beechey, in the collection of the National Maritime Museum

He took part in the British invasions of the Río de la Plata and Battle of Copenhagen of 1806–07, and attacked Rochefort in 1808. Stopford played an important part in the Battle of the Basque Roads. He was appointed to command HMS Caesar (80), with a squadron of two ships of the line and five frigates. On 23 February 1809 he fell in the four French frigates under the batteries of Sable d'Olonne, an action which left them disabled. Stopford continued his blockade until Lord Gambier chased a fleet of ten French sail of the line into the Basque Roads and assumed command. In the summer of 1809 he was called as a witness at the Court-martial of James, Lord Gambier which assessed whether Admiral Lord Gambier had failed to support Captain Lord Cochrane. Gambier was controversially cleared of all charges.

In 1810, he sailed to South Africa to become Commander-in-Chief of the Cape of Good Hope Station. He directed the operations that resulted in the capture of Java when on 8 August 1811, the Dutch settlement of Batavia capitulated to the British under Stopford and Lieutenant-General Sir Samuel Auchmuty. The British fleet consisted of some 100 vessels, including eight cruisers belonging to the East India Company. He was appointed Commander-in-Chief, Portsmouth in 1827.

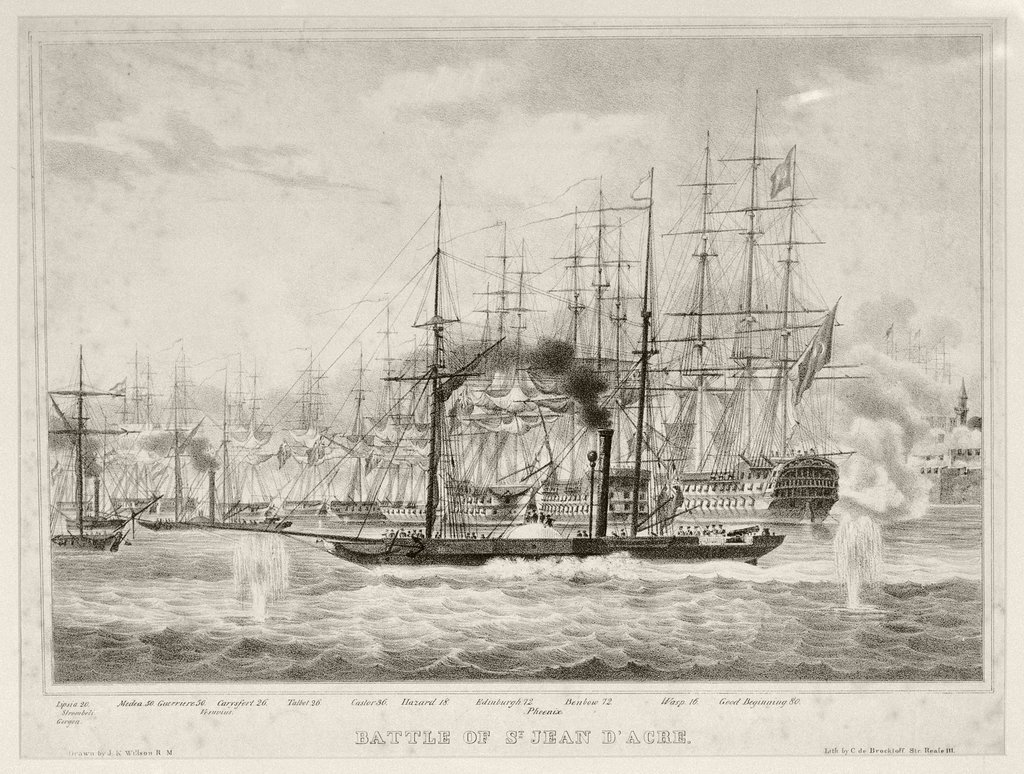
HMS Phoenix at the bombardment of Acre

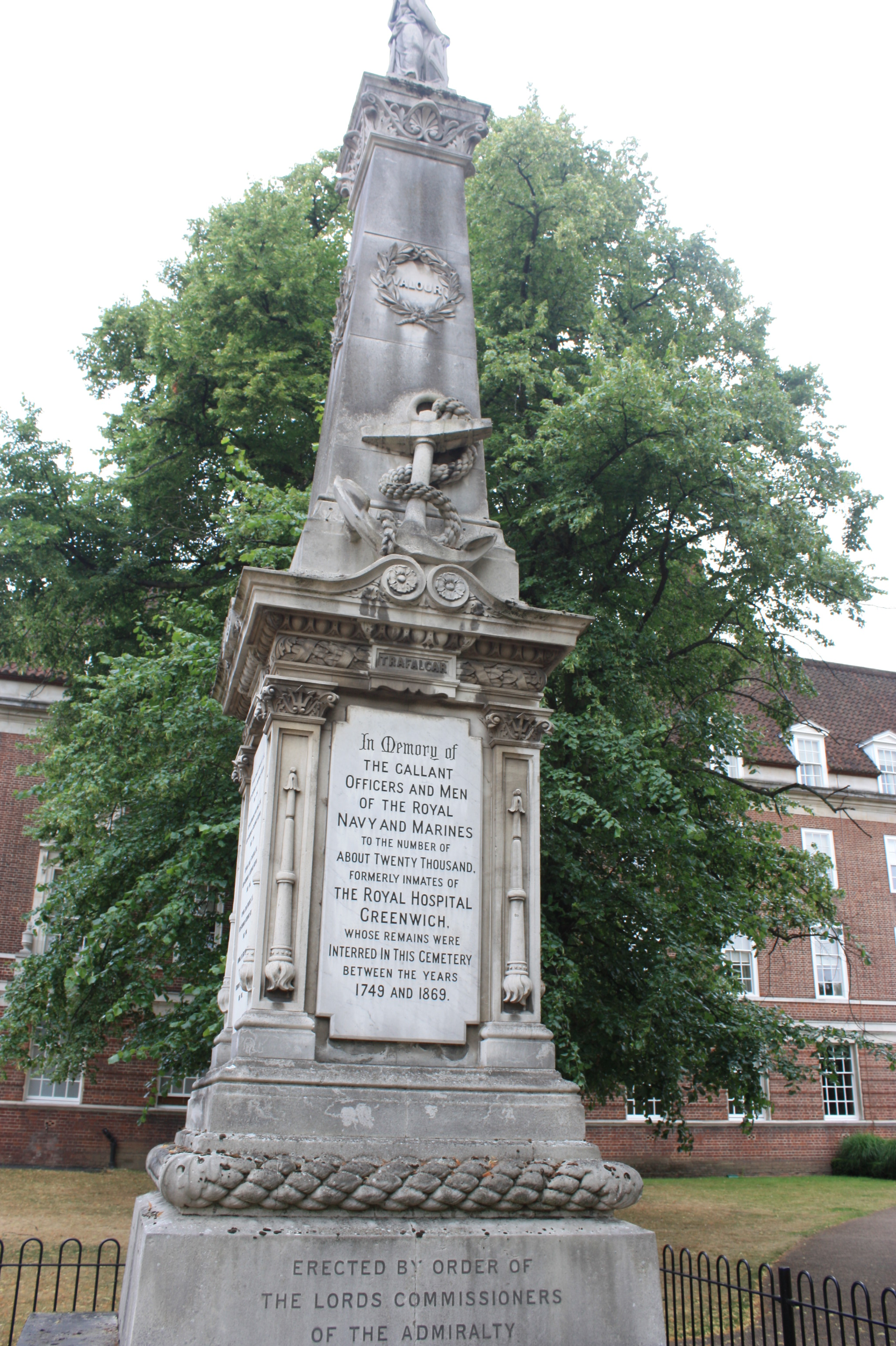
The Officers Monument, Greenwich Hospital Cemetery

Stopford became Rear-Admiral of the United Kingdom in 1834. His last active post, in his early seventies, was as commander-in-chief of the Mediterranean fleet during the Syrian War against the forces of Mehemet Ali. As Vice Admiral on board HMS Princess Charlotte (100) and subsequently HMS Phoenix, he was in command of the combined British, Turkish, and Austrian fleet during the bombardment of Acre on 3 November 1840. For his services in the Syrian War, Stopford was given the Freedom of the City of the City of London and presented with a commemorative "freedom box". The ornate silver and oak box is part of the collection of the National Maritime Museum, Greenwich. The following year he became Governor of the Greenwich Hospital at Greenwich, with the rank of admiral.

He is buried in Greenwich Hospital Cemetery. The cemetery was largely made into a pocket park in the late 19th century but his name is listed on the west face of the Officers' Monument in the centre of the park.

== Family ==
Stopford married Mary, daughter of Robert Fanshawe, in 1809. Their eldest son, Robert Fanshawe Stopford (1811–1891), also rose to the rank of admiral, and their second son, James John Stopford (1817–1868), became a vice admiral. Stopford died in June 1847, aged 79. His wife survived him by almost twenty years and died in June 1866.

He was one of the two Whig MPs for Ipswich in the United Kingdom parliament from 1806 to 1807.

== See also ==
- O'Byrne, William Richard (1849). "Stopford, Robert" . A Naval Biographical Dictionary . John Murray – via Wikisource.

Military offices
Preceded by Samuel Hood	Commander-in-Chief, Leeward Islands Station; 1802–1803	Succeeded by Sir Alexander Cochrane
Preceded by Sir Albemarle Bertie	Commander-in-Chief, Cape of Good Hope Station; 1810–1812	Succeeded by Charles Tyler
Preceded by Sir George Martin	Commander-in-Chief, Portsmouth; 1827–1830	Succeeded by Sir Thomas Foley
Preceded by Sir Josias Rowley	Commander-in-Chief, Mediterranean Fleet; 1837–1841	Succeeded by Sir Edward Owen
Preceded by Sir Thomas Hardy	Governor, Greenwich Hospital; 1841–1847	Succeeded by Sir Charles Adam
Honorary titles
Preceded by Sir George Martin	Rear-Admiral of the United Kingdom; 1834–1847	Succeeded by Sir T. Byam Martin
Preceded by Sir Davidge Gould	Vice-Admiral of the United Kingdom; 1847	Succeeded by Sir George Martin
Parliament of the United Kingdom
Preceded by Sir Andrew Snape Hamond, Bt. with William Middleton	Member of Parliament for Ipswich; 1806–1807; With: Richard Wilson	Succeeded by Sir Home Riggs Popham with Robert Alexander Crickitt
