= HMS Orestes (1781) =

Sloop of the Royal Navy (1781–1799)

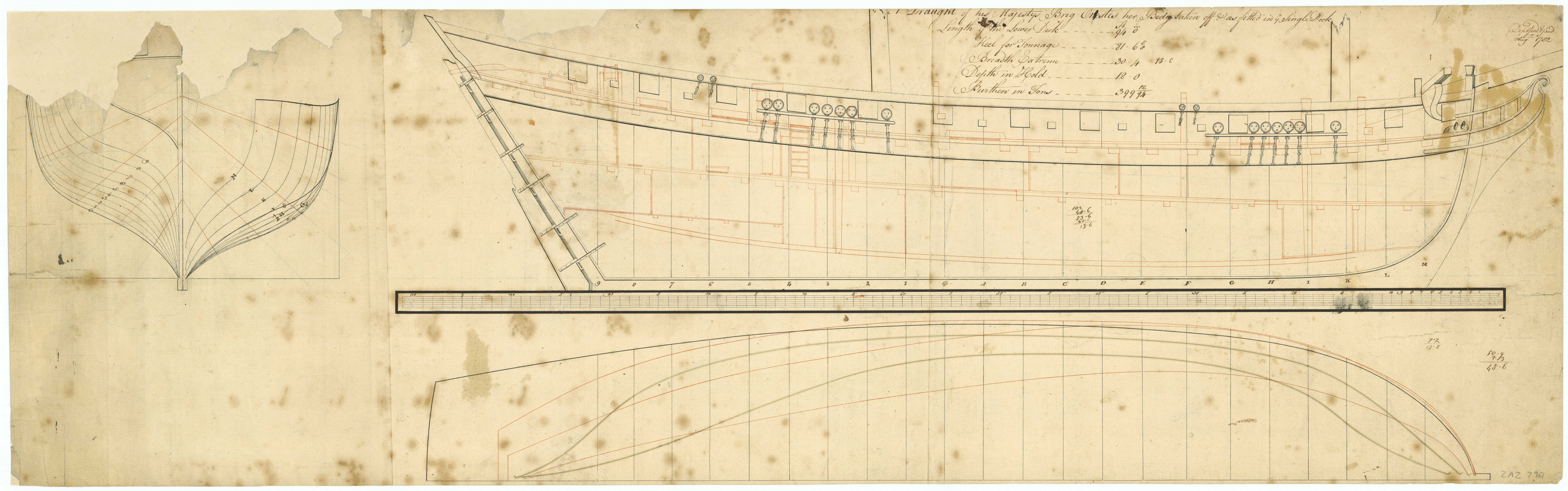
- Orestes

History

Batavian Republic
- Name: Mars
- Launched: 1781
- Fate: Captured 3 December 1781

Great Britain
- Name: HMS Orestes
- Acquired: 3 December 1781
- Fate: Disappeared November 1799

General characteristics
- Class & type: 18-gun brig-sloop
- Tons burthen: 396 40/94 (bm)
- Length: 94 ft (28.7 m) (overall); 81 ft (24.7 m) (keel)
- Beam: 30 ft 4 in (9.2 m)
- Depth of hold: 12 ft 1 in (3.68 m)
- Propulsion: Sails
- Sail plan: brig-sloop
- Complement: 125
- Armament: 18 × short 9-pounder guns (reduced to 6-pounder in 1792); 12 × ½-pounder swivels; 2 × 18-pounder carronades added in 1794

HMS Orestes was an 18-gun Dutch-built brig-sloop of the Royal Navy. She was originally built as the privateer Mars, which the British captured in 1781. She went on to serve during the Fourth Anglo-Dutch War and the French Revolutionary Wars.

The privateer was one of two captured in the North Sea in November 1781, both of which were taken into the Navy. Orestes became an effective anti-privateer vessel, taking several enemy vessels while serving off the British coast. She divided her time between a number of the Royal Navy's stations, serving in the West Indies and departing for the East Indies after time spent on the French coast. Her career in the Indian Ocean was short-lived, as she disappeared at sea in 1799, and is presumed to have foundered in a hurricane with the loss of her entire crew.

== Dutch service ==
Mars was built at Amsterdam in 1781, to prey on British shipping during the Fourth Anglo-Dutch War. On 30 November she sailed from the Texel with another large privateer, the Hercules. The vessels were commanded by a father and son team, by the name of Hogeboom; the father had been active as a privateer operating out of Flushing during the Seven Years' War under the alias John Hardapple. The two vessels were estimated to have cost upwards of £20,000. Their career as privateers was short-lived, and they managed to capture only a single British fishing smack before the 40-gun frigate HMS Artois, under the command of Captain John MacBride sighted them off Flamborough Head at 10 o'clock in the morning on 3 December.

== Capture ==
The two Dutch vessels initially approached Artois, apparently appearing 'confident'. The action began at 2pm, with one privateer standing off Artois's bow, while the other attacked her quarter. MacBride concentrated his fire on the ship on his quarter, forcing her to break away, while MacBride turned his attention to the ship off his bow. After thirty minutes this ship surrendered, while the other attempted to escape. MacBride wore around and chased her down, at which she struck her colours. MacBride wrote in his report that the two ships mounted '24 nine-pounders and ten cohorns each.' He described them as 'perfectly new, and alike; sail as fast as the Artois, and are the completest privateers I ever saw.' Mars was described as carrying 146 men, of whom nine were killed and fifteen were wounded. Artois had one man killed and six wounded in the whole engagement. Impressed by MacBride's report, the Admiralty approved their purchase for service with the Royal Navy, and she was registered as the sloop HMS Orestes on 16 February 1782.

== Royal Navy service ==
Orestes was fitted out at Deptford between February and August 1782, with her armament consisting of 18 short nine-pounders and ten ½-pounder swivel guns. The cost for her to be fitted and coppered came to £3,961.19.11p. Orestes was commissioned in July 1782 under her first captain, Commander John Bowers, and on 30 November that year she captured the privateer Complaissance. Command of Orestes passed to Commander James Ellis in November the following year. In 1784 she was involved in a skirmish, the Battle of Mudeford, with South Coast smugglers, during which the smugglers fatally wounded her master William Allen. Ellis remained as captain for the next two and a half years, being succeeded by Commander Manley Dixon in June 1786. Commander Thomas Revell Shivers took over in June 1789, and in December 1790 Commander Sir Harry Burrard was Orestes's new captain. While he was in command Orestes's main armament was reduced from nine-pounders to six-pounders. Burrard sailed her to the West Indies in 1792, where in January 1793 Commander Lord Augustus Fitzroy took over as captain. Orestes and Fitzroy returned to Britain in April 1793, during the first few months of the French Revolutionary Wars.

=== French Revolutionary Wars ===
Fitzroy was replaced in May 1794 by Commander Thomas Orrock, who was in turn superseded in September 1796 by Commander Christopher Parker. Orestes had been fitted with two eighteen-pounder carronades on 26 August 1794. Parker captured the privateer Furet in the English Channel on 3 September 1797, and relinquished command in February the following year to Commander William Haggitt. Orestes served in the Channel and was one of the ships watching the Battle of the Îles Saint-Marcouf on 7 May 1798, reduced to a spectator owing to the calm weather.

== Fate ==
Orestes sailed for the East Indies in August 1798, remaining on that station until disappearing in the Indian Ocean in November 1799. She is presumed to have been caught in a hurricane that struck the area and to have foundered on or about 5 November, with the loss of her 120-man crew.

== See also ==
- List of ships captured in the 18th century
