= Charles Pinckney National Historic Site =

National Historic Site of the United States

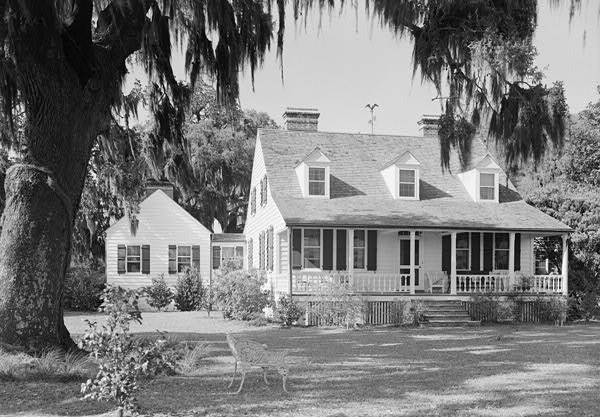
- Snee Farm House, 1940

- Location within South Carolina Location within the United States
- Location: Mount Pleasant, South Carolina, USA
- Nearest city: Charleston, South Carolina
- Coordinates: 32°50′46″N 79°49′29″W
- Area: 28.45 acres (11.51 ha)
- Established: September 8, 1988
- Visitors: 23,758 (in 2025)
- Governing body: National Park Service
- Website: Charles Pinckney National Historic Site
- Snee Farm-Charles Pinckney National Historic Site
- U.S. National Register of Historic Places
- U.S. National Historic Landmark
- Nearest city: Mount Pleasant, South Carolina
- Built: 1824
- NRHP reference No.: 73001702 (original); 100007048 (increase)

Significant dates
- Added to NRHP: April 13, 1973
- Boundary increase: October 10, 2021
- Designated NHL: November 7, 1973

The Charles Pinckney National Historic Site is a unit of the United States National Park Service, preserving a portion of Charles Pinckney's Snee Farm plantation and country retreat. The site is located at 1254 Long Point Road, Mount Pleasant, South Carolina. Pinckney (1757–1824) was a member of a prominent political family in South Carolina. He fought in the American Revolutionary War, was held for a period as prisoner in the North, and returned to the state in 1783. Pinckney, a Founding Father of the United States, served as a delegate to the constitutional convention where he contributed to drafting the United States Constitution.

This Snee Farm site was designated as a National Historic Landmark in 1973, and was designated a National Historic Site in 1988.

== Setting ==
The Charles Pinckney National Historic Site is located about 10 miles (16 km) northeast of Charleston, South Carolina, on 25 acres (10 ha) of Wando Neck, a peninsula formed at the confluence of the Wando and Cooper rivers. The site has wooded and swampy areas on the eastern and western parts of the property, and a manicured grassy area with ornamental plantings around the main house. The property includes, in addition to the main house, a barn, corncrib, and caretaker's residence. A stone cenotaph was erected in the late 20th century to commemorate Colonel Charles Pinckney, the father of governor Pinckney, who had acquired and developed Snee Farm as a rice and indigo plantation. It may have replaced an historic one installed by the younger Pinckney about 1785.

== History ==
Snee Farm was acquired by Colonel Charles Pinckney in 1754 from widow Ann (Scott) Allen and her second husband, John Savage, who was a Charleston merchant; he developed its 715 acres for the commodity crops of rice and indigo. He bequeathed it to his son Charles, who inherited it in 1782. The younger Pinckney used Snee Farm as a working plantation and country estate (it was conveniently accessible to Charleston by boat) until about 1816, when he placed the property in trust to settle debts.

The property was acquired in 1817 by Francis G. Deliesselines, who had it surveyed. William Mathews, another Low Country planter, bought the property in 1828. He demolished the existing buildings and had a new main house built that year, apparently on the original site of the first foundations. Mathews also had other plantations, and held a total of 352 slaves, indicating that he owned thousands of acres. He owned Snee Farm into 1848.

The Coastal Cottage at Snee Farm is typical of its time, and representative of a vernacular style for country living, although it also features some refined spaces for entertaining. It is rectangular in plan with a side-gable roof, full-width front porch, and a brick pier foundation. The interior features elaborate molding, paneling, and other decorative details. A slave row of cabins was built perpendicular to the main road.

The 715-acre estate and its outbuildings remained largely intact until the 1970s, when the owners subdivided it to profit from development near Charleston. The central portion of the historic estate, the house and 28 acres, makes up the current site, which was purchased in 1988 by preservationists. Following the passage of enabling legislation by the United States Congress, the National Park Service purchased the current site. Because the site no longer has any structures associated with the Pinckneys, details of their time on the property are limited to archaeological and documentary work. The contemporary museum on the historic site includes artifacts from the Pinckneys and later owners of Snee Farm spanning almost 200 years. The over 173,000 objects held there include artifacts of plantation life such as slave-made pottery and 18th and 19th-century tableware.

== Photos ==
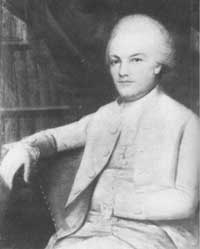
Charles Pinckney

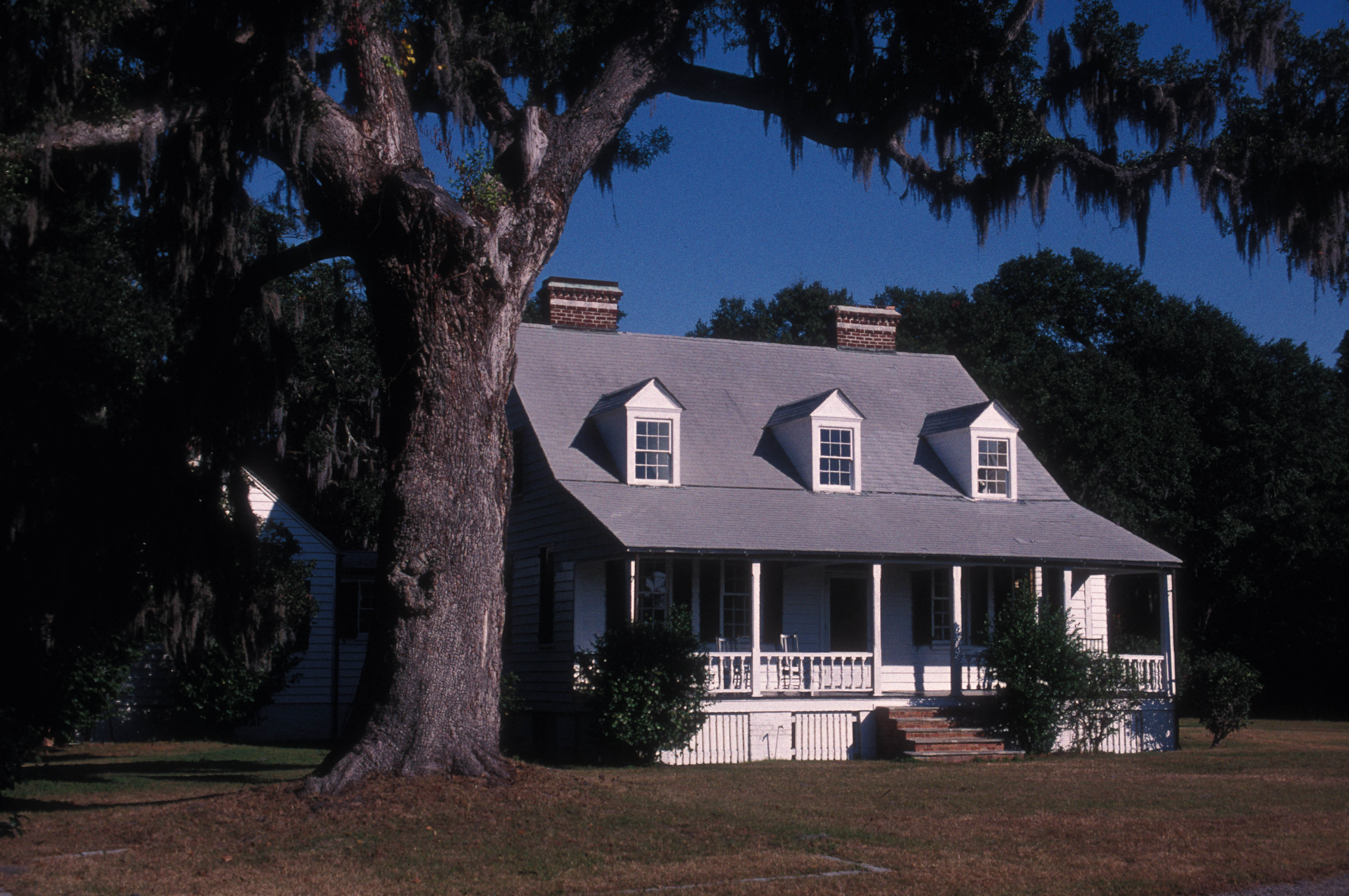
House in 2006

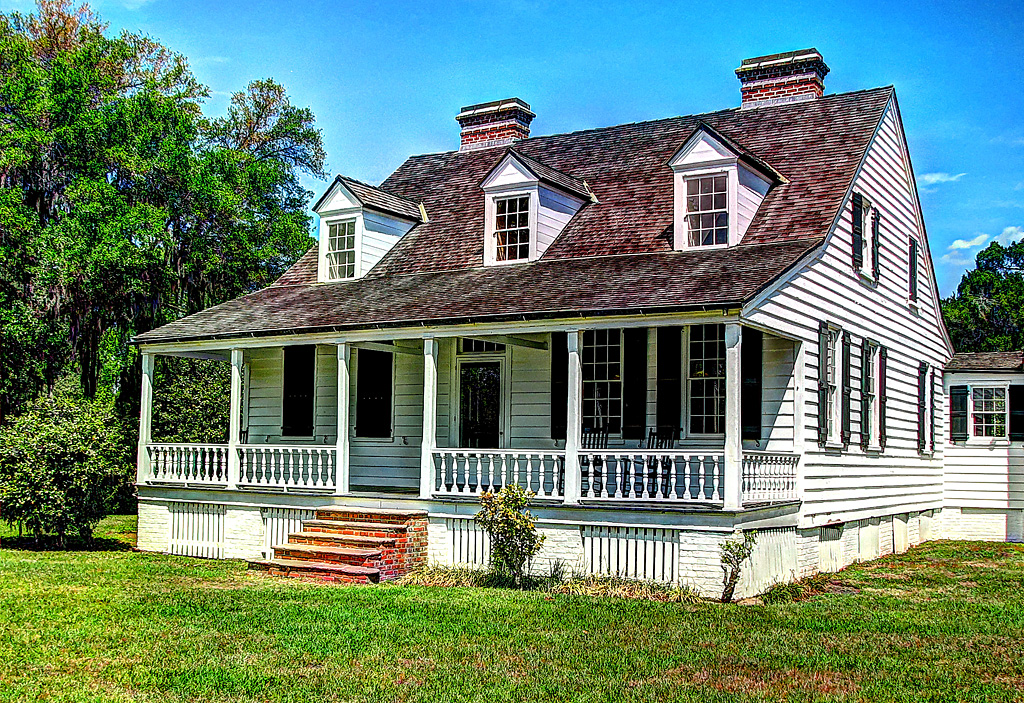
House in 2011

== See also ==
- Gullah/Geechee Cultural Heritage Corridor
- List of National Historic Landmarks in South Carolina
- National Register of Historic Places listings in Charleston, South Carolina
