= HMS Pylades (1781) =

Sloop of the Royal Navy

History

Dutch Republic
- Name: Hercules
- Builder: Amsterdam
- Launched: 1781
- Captured: December 1781

Great Britain
- Name: HMS Pylades
- Acquired: 3 December 1781
- Fate: Broken up by 23 March 1790

General characteristics
- Class & type: 18-gun brig-sloop
- Tons burthen: 399 12/94 (bm)
- Length: 90 ft 2 in (27.5 m) (overall); 81 ft 8 in (24.9 m) (keel)
- Beam: 30 ft 4 in (9.2 m)
- Depth of hold: 12 ft (3.66 m)
- Sail plan: Brig
- Complement: 125
- Armament: 18 × short 9-pounder guns + 12 × 1/2-pdr swivel guns

HMS Pylades was an 18-gun Dutch-built brig-sloop of the Royal Navy, launched in 1781. She was originally built as the privateer Hercules, which in November the British captured. She went on to serve during the Fourth Anglo-Dutch War and the subsequent years of peace.

The privateer was one of two captured in the North Sea at the same time, both of which the Royal Navy took into service. Pylades went on to serve under several commanders, spending most of her career sailing in the English Channel. She did not survive to see service in the French Revolutionary Wars, having been sold for breaking up in March 1790.

== Dutch service ==
Hercules was built at Amsterdam in 1781, to prey on British shipping during the Fourth Anglo-Dutch War. On 30 November she sailed from the Texel with another large privateer, Mars. The vessels were commanded by a father and son team named Hogenboome; the father had been active as a privateer operating out of Flushing during the Seven Years' War under the alias John Hardapple. The two vessels were estimated to have cost upwards of £20,000. Their career as privateers was short-lived. They managed to capture only a single British fishing smack before the 40-gun frigate HMS Artois, under the command of Captain John MacBride, sighted them off Flamborough Head at 10 o'clock in the morning on 3 December.

== Capture ==
The two Dutch vessels initially approached Artois, apparently appearing 'confident'. The action began at 2pm, with one privateer standing off Artois's bow, while the other attacked her quarter. MacBride concentrated his fire on the ship on his quarter, forcing her to break away, while he turned his attention to the ship off his bow. After thirty minutes this ship surrendered, while the other attempted to escape. MacBride wore around and chased her down, at which she struck her colours. MacBride wrote in his report that the two ships mounted '24 nine-pounders and ten cohorns each.' He described them as 'perfectly new, and alike; sail as fast as the Artois, and are the completest privateers I ever saw.' Hercules was described as carrying 164 men, of whom thirteen were killed and twenty were wounded. Artois had one man killed and six wounded in the whole engagement. Impressed by MacBride's report, the Admiralty approved their purchase for service with the Royal Navy, and she was registered as the sloop HMS Pylades on 16 February 1782. MacBride's report, though it convinced the Admiralty to acquire the two ships, was apparently greeted with 'much mirth, on account of the singular manner in which it was worded'.

== Royal Navy service ==
Pylades was fitted out at Deptford between February and 16 October 1782, with her armament consisting of 18 short nine-pounders and ten ½-pounder swivel guns. The cost for her to be fitted and coppered came to £3,719 5s 7d. Pylades was commissioned in August 1782 under her first captain, Lieutenant John Osborn. Osborn was promoted to the rank of master and commander in January 1783, and remained in command until 1786. During this time Pylades was paid off in May 1783 but recommissioned that same month under Osborn with orders to patrol in the Western Approaches.

On 6 October 1785, Pylades stationed a cutter off the Ram Head to intercept any smuggling boats that might attempt to land. When she discovered a small cutter lying-to, and several boats near the unknown vessel, Pylades's boat rowed alongside. At this point, the smugglers fired a swivel that killed one of Pylades's men, and escaped. The Crown offered a pardon to anyone (other than the actual perpetrator himself) to any of the smugglers that provided information that would result in the arrest of the perpetrator and the other smugglers. The Crown also offered a reward of £100 to the same end.

Osborn left Pylades in 1786. Pylades recommissioned in November that year under her new captain, Commander Davidge Gould, who was stationed off the Start.

== Fate ==
Commander John Stevens Hall became Pylades's new captain in or around March 1789, and served as such until the sloop was paid off in December that year. Pylades was then sold for £27 12s 6d and was broken up at Plymouth by 23 March 1790.
