= HMS Charon (1778) =

Fifth-rate of the Royal Navy

History

Great Britain
- Name: HMS Charon
- Completed: 1778
- In service: 1778
- Out of service: 1781
- Fate: Destroyed during the Siege of Yorktown
- Notes: Participated in: Battle of San Fernando de Omoa; Action of 13 August 1780; Siege of Yorktown

General characteristics
- Type: Fifth rate
- Tons burthen: 880
- Length: 140 ft (42.7 m)
- Beam: 35 ft (10.7 m)
- Draft: 16 ft (4.9 m)
- Crew: 300
- Armament: 20 × 18-pounder cannon; 22 × 9-pounder cannon; 2 × 6-pounder cannon

HMS Charon was a 44-gun fifth rate in service with the Royal Navy. Constructed in 1778, the ship took part in several conflicts in the Americas before being destroyed during the 1781 Siege of Yorktown. Her wreck lies in the York River.

== Construction and career ==
Charon was laid down as a 44-gun fifth rate in 1778 in Harwich, England, and was launched later that year. At launch, Charon's design incorporated a number of technological advancements, including copper sheathing on her hull and a ship-board chain pump. She was built of English oak and elm fixed together with iron, and bore a figurehead of the Charon, the ferryman of Hades. Following her launch Charon departed for the Americas to take part in the widening American Revolutionary War, which had seen France join the nascent United States in a war against Britain. When the Spanish Empire joined France and the United States against Britain in June 1779, the Royal Navy began operations against Spanish colonial possessions in the Americas.

In October 1779, Charon – in the company of Pomona, Lowestoffe, Porcupine, and (several days later) Racehorse – briefly laid siege to San Fernando Fortress in San Fernando de Omoa, Guatemala Captaincy. The British force captured the fort on 15 October, seizing a stash of Spanish bullion before withdrawing to Jamaica.

In 1780 Charon was present in Britain, where Captain Thomas Symonds took command. In August of that year Charon participated in the action of 13 August 1780, during which she and Bienfaisant engaged and captured the 64-gun Comte d'Artois, a former Indiaman converted into a privateer.

By mid-1781, Charon was serving on the East Coast of the United States in support of British General Cornwallis' invasion of the American South. When Cornwallis and his army withdrew into the town of Yorktown, Virginia, Charon became one of around 70 ships trapped in the York River by an overwhelmingly superior French fleet under the compte de Grasse. Of the ships present with Cornwallis, Charon was the largest, with some sources referring to the ship as a flagship.

With her use as a warship limited in the York River, the besieged British garrison stripped Charon of her guns, leaving her tied up alongside smaller British ships. On either 9 or 10 October, the ship came under heavy French cannon fire (described as heated or hot shot). Eventually a French shot landed in Charon's sail locker, setting the ship on fire and causing her to burn to the waterline. In flames, Charon drifted into several nearby ships, or at least the transport "Shipwright" and another transport, setting them on fire.

In the days following the loss of Charon, the British defenders of Yorktown continued to grow more desperate, eventually surrendering to allied Franco-American army on 19 October. As the senior Royal Navy officer present, Captain Symonds was one of the signatories of the articles of capitulation.

=== Wreck discovery ===
The wreck of Charon was discovered in the early 20th century, and in 1935 she was partially salvaged—though her identity was not known at the time. The still-unidentified wreck was examined by the Institute of Nautical Archaeology (INA) and Texas A&M in 1976, with INA returning to the site in 1980. Dives on the wreck confirmed the ship's dimensions matched that of Charon and recovered parts of the ship's chain pump.
