= George Cleghorn =

New Zealand doctor

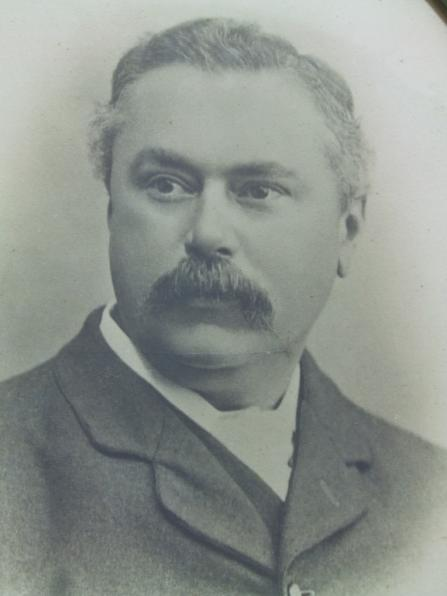
- Born: 1 September 1850; Calcutta, India
- Died: 11 June 1902 (aged 51); Wanganui, New Zealand
- Occupations: Physician and surgeon

George Cleghorn (1 September 1850–11 June 1902) was a prominent nineteenth-century physician and surgeon in New Zealand. He was a progressive doctor who kept abreast of the latest advances in Europe, Britain and the United States and introduced new procedures and techniques into the mainstream of New Zealand medical practice. He served as president of the New Zealand Medical Association in 1897.

== Early life ==
George Cleghorn was born in Calcutta, India on 1 September 1850, the son of James, a harbour pilot, and Susan Cleghorn. He was educated in England at Bedford Modern School. He studied medicine and surgery at St Thomas's Hospital, London, qualifying as MRCS and LSA in 1872. He was also subsequently awarded the degree of MD by the University of Durham in 1891.

In 1876, Cleghorn was appointed surgeon-superintendent of the New Zealand Immigration Department. His ship, however, was wrecked in a storm in the Bay of Biscay. After returning to England and enlisting as ship's doctor on the Brodwick Castle he finally arrived in Auckland at the end of the year. By 1878 he was established in private practice and as a surgeon at the newly opened Wairau Hospital in Blenheim.

== Career and reputation ==
At Wairau he introduced the sterilization of surgical equipment in line with the discoveries of Louis Pasteur and Joseph Lister, and performed advance and complicated abdominal operations, including the first recorded appendicectomy in New Zealand. He also carried out a two stage laparotomy on John Ballance, the Prime Minister of New Zealand, who was mortally ill with chronic bowel obstruction. Although the operation was initially proclaimed as a success, Ballance subsequently died from peritonitis.

He also introduced an isolated fever ward at Wairau, in defiance of the initial opposition of the hospital's governors, which was used during an outbreak of typhoid in 1899. He carried out research in neurosurgery and into the presence of uric acid in the body as the cause of disease and followed the investigations of William B. Coley into immunology as a treatment for Cancer. He also sought for improvements in the welfare and treatment of mentally ill patients. Cleghorn advocated for Māori people's right to be treated in a local hospital instead of being forced to travel long distances for medical treatment.

Cleghorn was also known as a kind and benevolent man. Despite being one of the leading doctors in the Colony, he was always prepared to offer his skills and knowledge free of charge to those unable to pay. He was also active in the wider community and helped to establish the Marlborough Cricket Association and Football Club and contributed to the construction of a gymnasium and swimming-baths in the town of Blenheim. A keen sportsman himself, he owned and trained a number of racehorses.

In 1896 the New Zealand Medical Association was reconstituted as a branch of the British Medical Association and Cleghorn served as President for one year in 1897-8.

== Later career ==
In 1900 Cleghorn was suffering from chronic kidney disease and high blood pressure, and he decided to close his General Practice and return to England for a spell of recuperation and further medical research. On his departure he was presented with a gift of 300 gold sovereigns from the people of Marlborough. He also received a kahu kiwi, a traditional feather cloak from the local Maori people which was subsequently presented to the Pitt Rivers Museum in the University of Oxford in 1913. According to the Wanganui Herald: 'The peer of the rich, the friend of the poor, he was as kind as he was skilful, and on the day of his departure from Blenheim he deservedly received the most flattering send-off ever accorded to anyone by the people of Marlborough'.

In 1901 he returned to New Zealand and established a consultancy in Wanganui. He died on 11 June 1902 from a brain haemorrhage. A memorial band rotunda, paid for by public subscription, was erected in the centre of Blenheim in his honour.

== Family ==
George Cleghorn was married three times. Firstly in 1877 to Harriet Mossop who died in 1881. In 1886, he married Annie Browning; they had one daughter but Annie died during her birth. In 1888 he married Annie's sister Helen and they had two children.

== Legacy ==
In 2026, the Pitt River Museum returned the kahu kiwi cloak, with ownership transferring to the Ngāti Rārua o Te Wairau Society, who described it as having significance "beyond measure" and as a way to honour Cleghorn's support of Māori people.
