= Joseph Peyton =

Royal Navy Admiral (1725–1804)

Admiral Joseph Peyton
- Born: 1725
- Died: 27 September 1804 (aged 78–79)
- Military career
- Allegiance: United Kingdom
- Branch: Royal Navy
- Service years: c.1743–1804
- Rank: Admiral
- Commands: HMS Savage; HMS Prince George; HMS Saint George; HMS Prince; HMS Aquilon; HMS Minerva; HMS Belleisle; HMS Modeste; HMS Cumberland; HMS Britannia; Mediterranean Fleet; Downs Station
- Conflicts: War of the Austrian Succession; Battle of Toulon; Seven Years' War; Battle of Lagos; American Revolutionary War; First Battle of Ushant; Battle of Cape St. Vincent; Second Battle of Ushant; Battle of Cape Spartel; French Revolutionary Wars

Admiral Joseph Peyton (1725 – 27 September 1804) was a Royal Navy officer who became commander-in-chief of the Mediterranean Fleet.

== Naval career ==
Peyton joined the Royal Navy on 4 June 1743. Promoted to commander in March 1756, he took command of the sloop HMS Savage in 1756 and the second-rate HMS Prince George in 1757. Promoted to captain in December 1757, he went on to command the second rate HMS Prince in 1759 and saw action at the Battle of Lagos in August 1759 during the Seven Years' War.

Peyton went on to command the fifth-rate HMS Minerva in 1762, the third-rate HMS Belleisle in 1766 and the third-rate HMS Cumberland in 1777. In HMS Cumberland he saw action at the Battle of Ushant in July 1778 and at the first Battle of Cape St Vincent in 1780, during the Anglo-French War. He became commander-in-chief of the Mediterranean Fleet in 1789 and commander-in-chief of the Downs in 1794.

Military offices
Preceded by Phillips Cosby	Commander-in-Chief, Mediterranean Fleet; 1789–1792	Succeeded by Samuel Goodall
Preceded by John MacBride	Commander-in-Chief, The Downs; 1794–1796	Succeeded by John Bazely (Acting)
