= Davidge Gould =

Royal Navy Admiral (1758–1847)

Admiral Sir Davidge Gould GCB
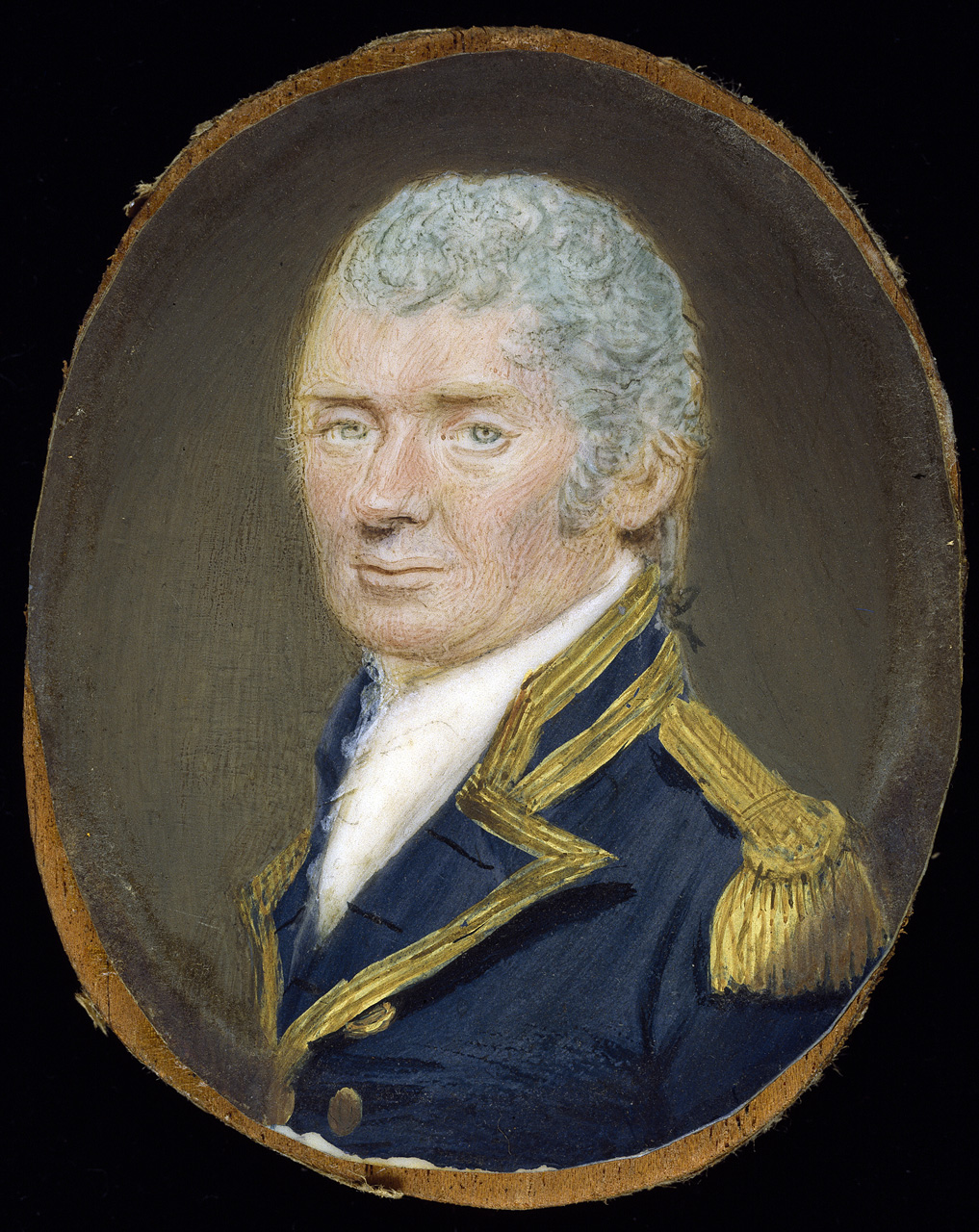
- Minature of Gould
- Born: 1758; Bridgwater, Somerset
- Died: 23 April 1847 (aged 88–89); Hawkshead, Hertfordshire
- Military career
- Allegiance: United Kingdom of Great Britain and Ireland
- Branch: Royal Navy
- Service years: 1772 – 1847
- Rank: Admiral
- Commands: HMS Pylades; HMS Ferret; HMS Brune; HMS Cyclops; HMS Bedford; HMS Audacious; HMS Majestic; HMS Windsor Castle
- Conflicts: Battle of the Saintes; Naval Battle of Genoa; Naval Battle of Hyères Islands; Battle of the Nile
- Awards: Knight Grand Cross of the Order of the Bath

Sir Davidge Gould GCB (1758 – 23 April 1847) was an officer of the Royal Navy. He served during the American Revolutionary, French Revolutionary and the Napoleonic Wars, eventually rising to the rank of admiral. He was one of Vice-Admiral Horatio Nelson's Band of Brothers at the Battle of the Nile in 1798.

== Family and early life ==
Gould was born at Bridgwater, Somerset, the son of the Richard Gould, of Wells. He was distantly related to the authors Henry and Sarah Fielding, and was the nephew of the naturalist William Gould. His uncle, Sir Henry Gould, was a Justice of the Common Pleas. Davidge joined the navy in May 1772, serving as a volunteer in the Mediterranean aboard HMS Alarm. He later moved to the North American coast, where he was advanced to midshipman. He was promoted to lieutenant on 7 May 1779, later serving aboard HMS Winchelsea and HMS Phoenix. He saw action in the American Revolutionary War, taking part in attacks on shore batteries and cutting out American ships.

He served in succession aboard HMS Ulysses, HMS Bristol and HMS Conqueror, and was present aboard the Conqueror at Admiral Sir George Rodney's victory at the Battle of the Saintes in 1782. He then moved aboard HMS Formidable and promoted to commander in June 1782, after which he was given command of the sloop Pachahunter, and then HMS Pylades and HMS Ferret, on the Home and Mediterranean Stations. Gould spent 13 months aboard the Pylades, during which time he was active in anti-smuggling operations. He then spent four years on half-pay, before being promoted to post-captain on 23 March 1789, and assigned to the command of the frigate HMS Brune.

== Captaincy ==
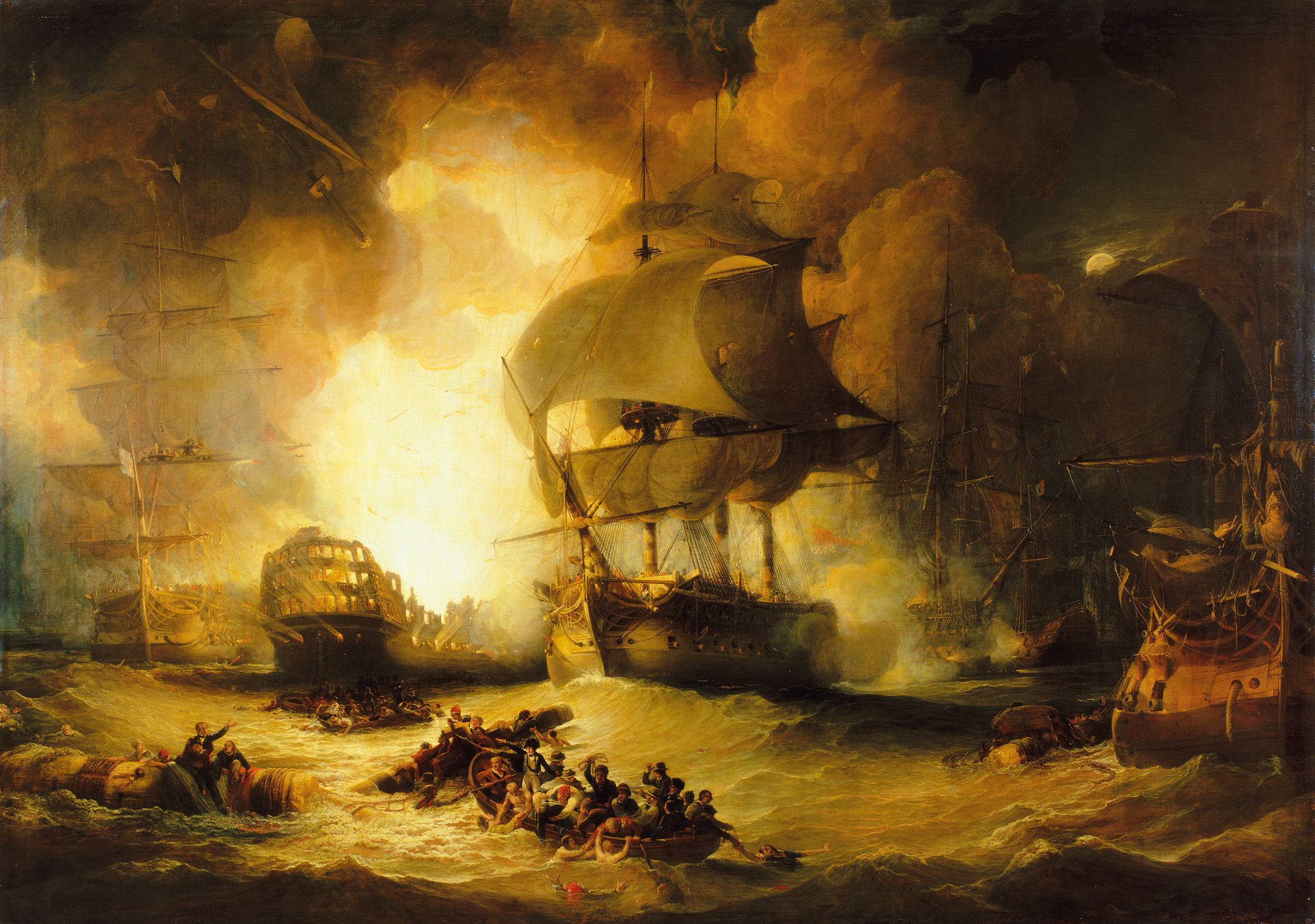
The Destruction of 'L'Orient' at the Battle of the Nile by George Arnald. The battle was a decisive victory for the British, and a major blow to Napoleon's eastern ambitions

He sailed to the West Indies Station aboard her, but by 1794, he was in the Mediterranean, in command of HMS Cyclops at the reduction of Corsica, and then HMS Bedford at the Naval Battle of Genoa in March 1795, and the Naval Battle of Hyères Islands in July 1795, as part of Vice-Admiral William Hotham's fleet. During the action off Genoa, the Bedford came under fire from the Ça Ira and the Censeur, resulting in nine killed and seventeen wounded aboard the Bedford. Gould took command of HMS Audacious in 1796, and was present at Admiral John Jervis's attack on Cádiz. He was still in command of Audacious when she was ordered to join Nelson's squadron in their search for the French. On 1 August, Gould commanded Audacious at the Battle of the Nile, engaging the French ship Conquérant and helped to force her surrender. Gould then took part in the blockades of Malta and Genoa for the rest of 1798 and into 1799.

== Later life and flag rank ==
The Audacious escorted a convoy to Britain in late 1800, and on arrival was paid off. In spring 1801, Gould was appointed to command HMS Majestic, serving in British waters, and in the West Indies. He commanded HMS Windsor Castle in between 1803 and 1804 but was forced to resign command owing to ill-health. He never again served at sea. He was promoted to rear-admiral in October 1807, vice-admiral in July 1810 and admiral in May 1825. He was awarded a gold medal for his service at the Nile, and was invested as a Knight Commander of the Order of the Bath in 1815, followed by being invested as a Knight Grand Cross of the Order of the Bath in 1833. He was also appointed to the post of Vice-Admiral of the United Kingdom on 17 November 1846, a post he held until his death.

== Personal life and death ==
Gould married Harriet Willes, eldest daughter of the Reverend William Willes, Archdeacon of Taunton, in 1803. The couple did not have any children. He received a pension of £300 per annum, and died at the age of 89 at Hawkshead, Hertfordshire on 23 April 1847. He was by then the last surviving member of Nelson's 'Band of Brothers', the captains who had fought with him at the Nile.

== See also ==
- O'Byrne, William Richard (1849). "Gould, Davidge" . A Naval Biographical Dictionary . John Murray – via Wikisource.

== Notes ==
Honorary titles
Preceded by Sir George Martin	Vice-Admiral of the United Kingdom; 1846 – 1847	Succeeded by Sir Robert Stopford
