= HMS Bienfaisant =

Ship of the line of the Royal Navy

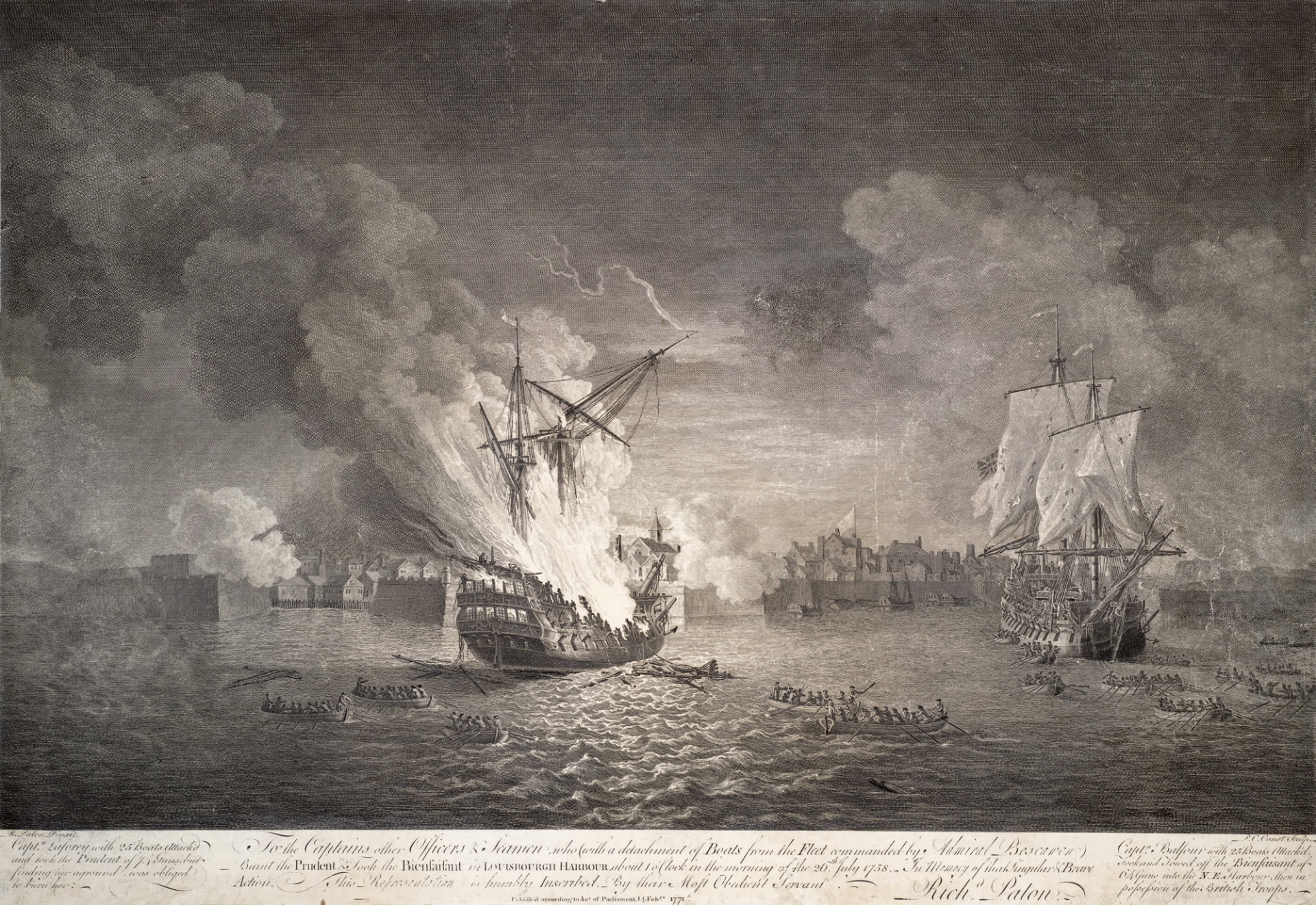
- Bienfaisant (on the right) at point of capture during the siege of Louisbourg in 1758.

History

France
- Name: Bienfaisant
- Launched: 13 October 1754
- Captured: 25 July 1758, by Royal Navy

Great Britain
- Name: HMS Bienfaisant
- Acquired: 25 July 1758
- Fate: Broken up, 1814
- Notes: Participated in: Battle of Cape St Vincent

General characteristics
- Class & type: 64-gun third rate ship of the line
- Tons burthen: 13607/94 (bm)
- Length: 153 ft 9 in (46.9 m) (gundeck)
- Beam: 44 ft 6 in (13.6 m)
- Depth of hold: 19 ft 4 in (5.9 m)
- Propulsion: Sails
- Sail plan: Full-rigged ship
- Armament: 64 guns of various weights of shot

Bienfaisant was a 64-gun ship of the line of the French Navy, launched in 1754.

A cutting out expedition ordered by Admiral Edward Boscawen of the British Royal Navy captured her on the night of 25 July 1758 during the 1758 Siege of Louisbourg. Bienfaisant and the 74-gun Prudent were the last remaining ships of the line of the French squadron in Louisbourg harbour. Prudent had run aground and so her captors set her alight, but men commanded by Commander George Balfour of HMS Aetna boarded and brought out Bienfaisant. The action provided a decisive moment of the siege; the fortress surrendered the next day.

== British Service ==
The Royal Navy commissioned Bienfaisant as the third rate HMS Bienfaisant.

In late 1777 Bienfaissant, Captain McBride, captured American Tartar privateer, of 24 guns and 200 men. Bienfaissant took American Tartar to St. John's, Newfoundland.

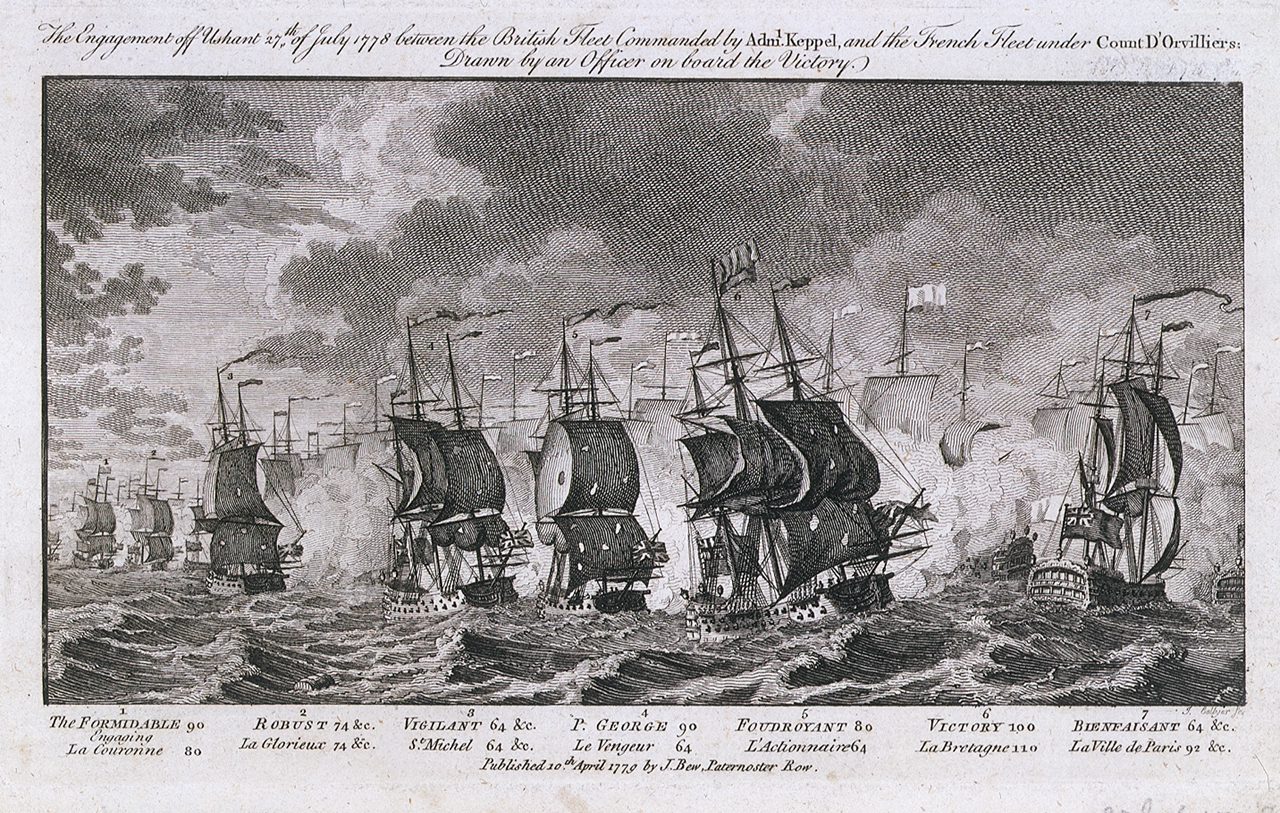
Bienfaisant (far right) at the Battle of Ushant, 1778

She took part in the Battle of Cape St Vincent in 1780 and the capture of the Comte de Artois off Ireland in August.

On 19 July 1780, Bienfaisant encountered the French 32-gun frigate Nymphe, returning to Brest from America under Du Rumain. Nymphe managed to escape.

Bienfaisant participated, under the command of Captain Braithwaite, in the 1781 Battle of Dogger Bank with reduced armament on her lower deck as the last ship in the line.

Bienfaisant was at Plymouth on 20 January 1795 and so shared in the proceeds of the detention of the Dutch naval vessels, East Indiamen, and other merchant vessels that were in port on the outbreak of war between Britain and the Netherlands.

== Fate ==
Bienfaisant was broken up in 1814.

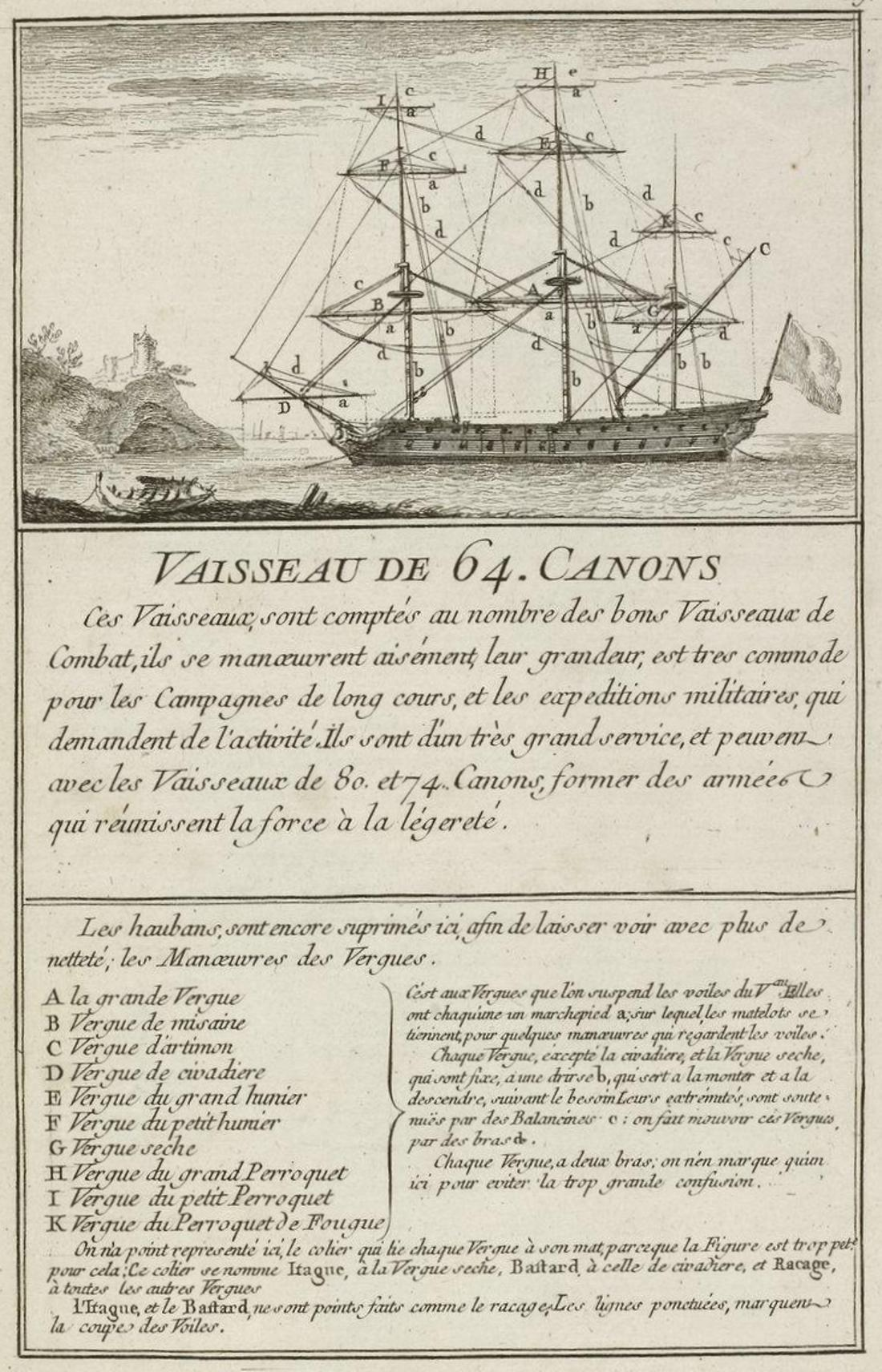
A typical Frenchman of 64 guns of the period

== See also ==
- List of ships captured in the 18th century
