= Josep Bonaplata i Corriol =

Catalan businessman

Josep Bonaplata
- Born: 1795; Barcelona
- Died: 2 June 1843 (aged 47–48); Bunyol, Foia de Bunyol, Valencian Community
- Occupations: Founder of Bonaplata Factory, business executive, engineering
- Parent(s): Ramon Bonaplata and Teresa Corriol

Josep Bonaplata i Corriol (1795 - Bunyol, 2 June 1843) was a Catalan industrial entrepreneur known for introducing the steam engine into Catalonia and Spain. His parents, Ramon Bonaplata and Teresa Corriol, were textile manufacturers, principally of chintz, and he had three brothers, Salvador, Ramon and Narcís.

Today, in honour of Jose Bonaplata, the Bonaplata Award is given annually by the Association of the Museum of Science and Technology and Industrial Archaeology of Catalonia.

== Youth and trip to England ==
Josep Bonaplata worked at the family factory until his father retired and the business was inherited by his older brother, Salvador. In 1828 Josep and his friend Joan Vilaregut then started a cotton textile factory in Sallent, using mechanical looms that were hydraulically powered by the Llobregat River. This was the first time in Spain that mechanical looms had been used. In 1829, in an attempt to modernise his business, he was given permission by the Spanish government to import an English steam engine. The news was greeted with strong opposition from the Catalan trade organisation, the Royal Barcelona Board of Trade, as it was feared that the project was a cover-up for importing cheaper English textiles. The businessmen would later change their minds after inspecting the new factory site in Barcelona in March 1833.

Bonaplata travelled to Lancashire with Joan Rull and a man named Camps to learn about the textile industry and to buy machinery. In London, he received authorisation to import a steam engine from the Spanish ambassador Francisco Cea Bermúdez. Bonaplata and Rull returned to Catalonia in July 1830, but Camps stayed in Manchester to continue learning about the machinery.>

== Industrial entrepreneur ==
On 30 September 1831 Bonaplata formed the firm Bonaplata, Rull, Vilaregut and Company with his three brothers, his friend Joan Vilaregut, and his new partner Joan Rull. The company was capitalized at 1.600.000 reales. The Bonaplata Factory (also known as El Vapor) had two activities: an iron foundry with a workshop for making mechanical looms, and a mechanical weaving and spinning factory. This was the first factory in Spain to use a steam engine to power machinery. Its value and social impact was immediately recognised and it inspired the modernisation of the economy.

However, the factory was attacked and burned on the night of 5 and 6 August 1835 by Luddite gangs known as Bullangues The losses from the disaster were put at 2.696.625 reales. Bonaplata sued the Spanish government for failing to stop the riot. Initially, the government tried to evade responsibility, but then asked the Cortes Generales (parliament) for permission to pay compensation. On 1 April 1837, Josep Bonaplata appeared before the Cortes and agreed to build a new and bigger steam-powered factory to begin the modernisation of Spanish industry, but the treasury committee decided that he must give up any compensation claims if he wanted state investment for his new venture.

Before the issue was resolved, Bonaplata moved to Madrid where he formed Bonaplata, Sandford and Company to fulfill his vision. The business was established in the former convent of Santa Barbara, in the Hortaleza neighbourhood. He was now forty-two, and still single. The business included his second iron foundry in collaboration with the English engineer named William Sanford. Bonaplata first began suffering health problems, which could explain why his younger brothers Ramon and Narcís joined him here. In 1839 Sanford gave up his share in the company and it was renamed Bonaplata and Brothers, though Sanford remained as the principal engineer. Ramon took over the Madrid business, which was capitalised at 200.000 reales, while Narcís opened a new blast furnace in Seville capitalised at 90.000 reales. Major decisions for both businesses were still taken by Josep.

Two years later Narcís took full control of the Andalusian factory, leaving Bonaplata y Hermanos in Madrid capitalised at 403,063 reales. Although Josep Bonaplata owned the bigger part of the Santa Barbara concern, the legal documents acknowledged his brother Ramon as its sole administrator, probably because of Josep's poor health, though he retained the right to act on whatever he thought necessary.

== Rural businesses ==
A few months after the destruction of El Vapor, in December 1835, Josep Bonaplata had paid 187,000 reales for the Espinar estate in the Valencian village of Llíria. Here he built an olive oil mill, and planted many almond trees. He also invested 1,190,000 reales in a project that would link the Cinca and Segre to irrigate the Llitera area. The plan was promoted by his friend Antoni Gassó, but it came to nothing.

== Illness and death ==
The severe respiratory problems that Bonaplata had been suffering affected his work. Fearing a sudden attack, he made his will in May 1840. Three years later he decided to retire at the Espinar estate in Llíria. On 30 May 1843, Bonaplata handed his will to his executor and started out for his Espinar estate, but he suffered a fatal asthma attack on 2 June close to the nearby village of Bunyol. He was 48.

He died without issue so his brothers inherited his estate. It is known that he had had an illegitimate daughter named Sofia, but she died at birth in 1840. It is possible that Josep married the mother of his child, Jesusa Romero.

=== See also ===
- History of the cotton industry in Catalonia

=== Bibliography ===
- "Josep Bonaplata". Enciclopèdia Catalana. Barcelona: Grup Enciclopèdia.
- Nadal i Oller, Jordi (1983). "Los Bonaplata: Tres generaciónes de industriales catalanes en la España del siglo XIX" [The Bonaplatas: Three generations of Catalan industrialists in 19th century Spain] (PDF). Revista de Historia Economica [Journal of Iberian and Latin American Economic History] (in Spanish). 1 (1). Instituto Figuerola de História y Ciencias Sociales [Figuerola Institute of History and Social Sciences]: 79–95. doi:10.1017/S021261090001243X. S2CID 154578107.

=== Further reading ===
- Roger Williams (2008). Burning Barcelona : the night the old world died. London: Bristol Book Publishing. ISBN 9780955537615. OCLC 881091387. An historical novel about the installation of the steam engine by Josep Bonaplata and William Sanford, an engineer from the Boulton & Watt manufactory.

=== External links ===
- Bonaplata Awards
