= Bonaplata Factory =

First Spanish factory to use steam engines

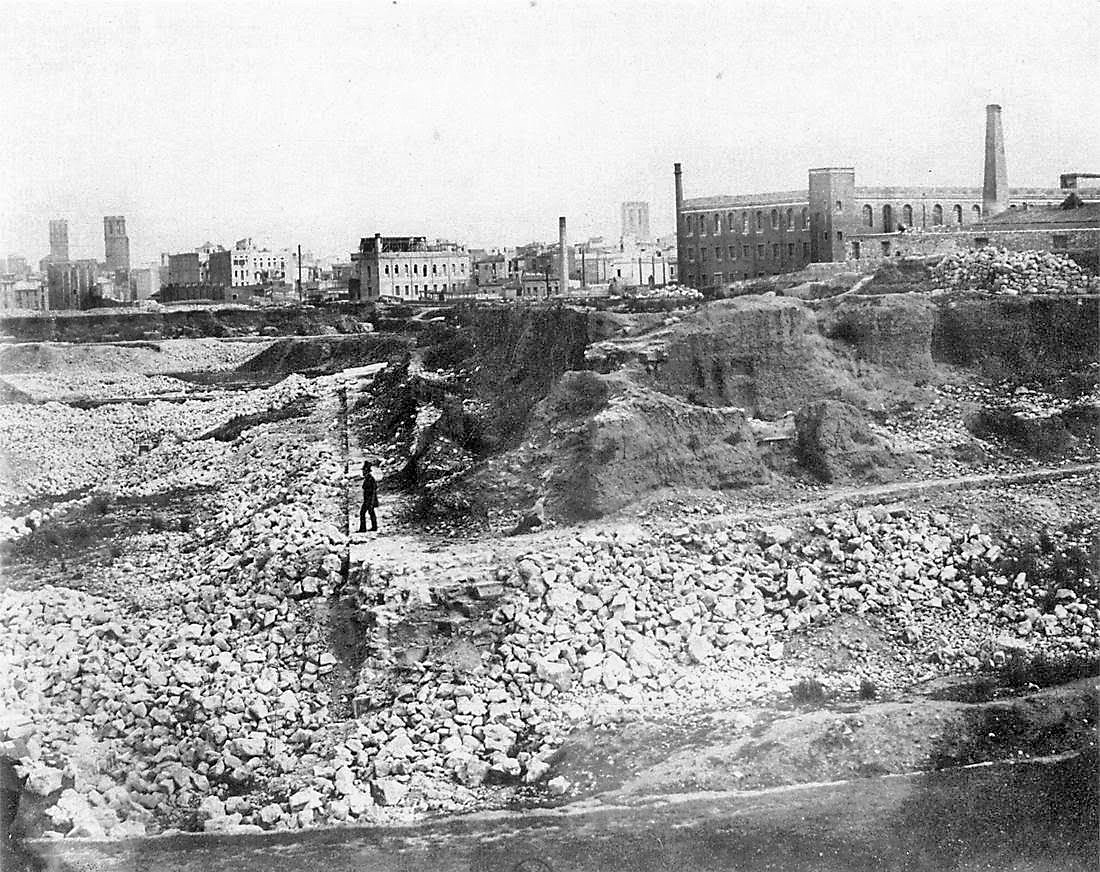
Remains of the Tellers Bastion in 1855 showing the buildings of the former Bonaplata Factory to the right

The Bonaplata Factory (1832-1838) (also known as El Vapor lit. 'The Steam Engine') was the first factory in Spain to successfully use steam engines (using them to drive mechanical textile machinery), the first foundry to manufacture and repair cast-iron machinery for sale to the textile industry and, significantly, gained government concessions that definitively demonstrated the government's commitment to domestic manufacturing.

Historians recognise the factory's establishment as a major milestone in the history of Catalan cotton industry and of Spanish industrialisation more generally. The Factory's foundation marked the opening of the flood-gates of capital into the industry and foretold its full and rapid industrialisation. In 1867 Ildefons Cerdà, the Barcelona urban planner who reshaped the city, talking about his youth, remembered "El Vapor" as the turning point between two ages.

Although the Factory was severely damaged by fire during riots in 1835 (which eventually led to the company's dissolution in 1838), the foundry part of the factory recovered operation quickly after the fire and has continued to remain in operation through various mergers and acquisitions, later becoming part of La Maquinista Terrestre y Marítima and is now a subsidiary of Alstom.

== Context ==
In 1828, the monarch, Ferdinand VII, who was keen to attract the Catalan bourgeoisie in his fight against his political enemies, visited Barcelona and received the industrialists. His interest coincided with the policy of the then Minister of Finance, Luis López Ballesteros, who was one of the very few politicians of that time who conceived economic policy from a capitalist perspective. For the textile industry, this led to the prohibition of imports that would compete with domestic textile manufacturing.

Also in 1828, Josep Bonaplata, departing the family chintz printing business which had been inherited by his brother, set out to make his own mark. He rented space in factory in Sallent with his friend Joan Vilaregut and installed Spain's first mechanical looms using hydraulic power from the Llobregat River. However they found the river unreliable and decided to abandon their efforts.

Bonaplata and Vilaregut sought, and in November 1829 received, a royal decree giving them a right to import foreign textile machinery. And so, in the summer of 1830 Bonaplata and Joan Rull visited Lancashire with the intention of familiarising themselves and purchasing the most modern equipment and placing another Catalan named Camps in a factory to gain experience. England had removed in 1825, the bans on the export of skilled workers and this proved to be crucial for the establishment of the Bonaplata Factory. Amongst their plans were to manufacture under licence the throstle frame for spinning invented in 1828 by Charles Danforth, since the export of machinery was prohibited until 1842. (Although the self-acting (fully automatic) mule had been invented in 1825 by Richard Roberts, it was not introduced to Barcelona until 1844, by another firm.

== Establishment ==
On 30 September 1831 Bonaplata formed the firm Bonaplata, Rull, Vilaregut and Company with his three brothers, Joan Vilaregut and Joan Rull. Joan Rull was another innovator who had introduced hydraulically powered cylindrical or roller printing in 1818. The company thereby represented an alliance between the most dynamic representatives of the different sectors of the industry.

On 20 December 1831, the Ministry of Finance made public the contract with the company. It included the right to import cast-iron, copper, coal and surprisingly English yarn free of import duties, freedom from regulation by local authorities, a grant of money and of land and in return, an obligation to manufacture 200 mechanical looms and 40 spinning machines a year for cotton, linen and wool, and to grant free access to any manufacturer wanting to learn the steam technology, essentially a technology transfer to the rest of the Kingdom.

The factory was built just inside the western most walls of the city on Carrer Tellers in Barcelona's Raval neighborhood, just east of today's Plaça de la Universitat. The foundry began operation in 1832, and in 1833 the spinning, weaving and printing operation began. At the beginning of 1835, the company had a staff of between six hundred and seven hundred people.

Thomson highlights the uniqueness of the Factory,

[The Factory] was not purely a cotton manufacturing concern but also an iron-working and machine-building one. The possession of these facilities was as significant as its steam engine. Its foundation was intended to be a means for reequipping the local industry[...] It was this combination of the role of spinning with that of machine-making which made the factory the target of smaller-scale producers in the city in 1835 - it was not only competing directly with them in the production of yarn, but was also producing the means for others to do so.

The Factory's foundation opened the flood-gates of capital into the industry: within a year, five other Barcelona manufacturers were installing steam engines, with another in Vilanova i La Geltrú, 60 kilometres to the south of Barcelona. Another royal decree of April 30, 1832, made definitive the ban of 1828 of competitive textile imports and also abolished all restrictions on the import of cotton machinery in Spain making clear the governments commitment to the industry, even at the cost of traditional spinners and weavers, largely a semi-artisanal, cottage industry.

In 1834 the French geographer Moreau de Jonnès praised the factory in the Spanish part of his "Statistique de l'Agriculture de France", which compared European economies. This was translated into Spanish by the lawyer and future politician Pascual Madoz in his "Estadística de España" in 1835, who added the comment that El Vapor brought about a "full revolution". In 1846 Madoz again highlighted the importance of the Bonaplata Factory as the dawn of the new industrial age.

== Fire ==
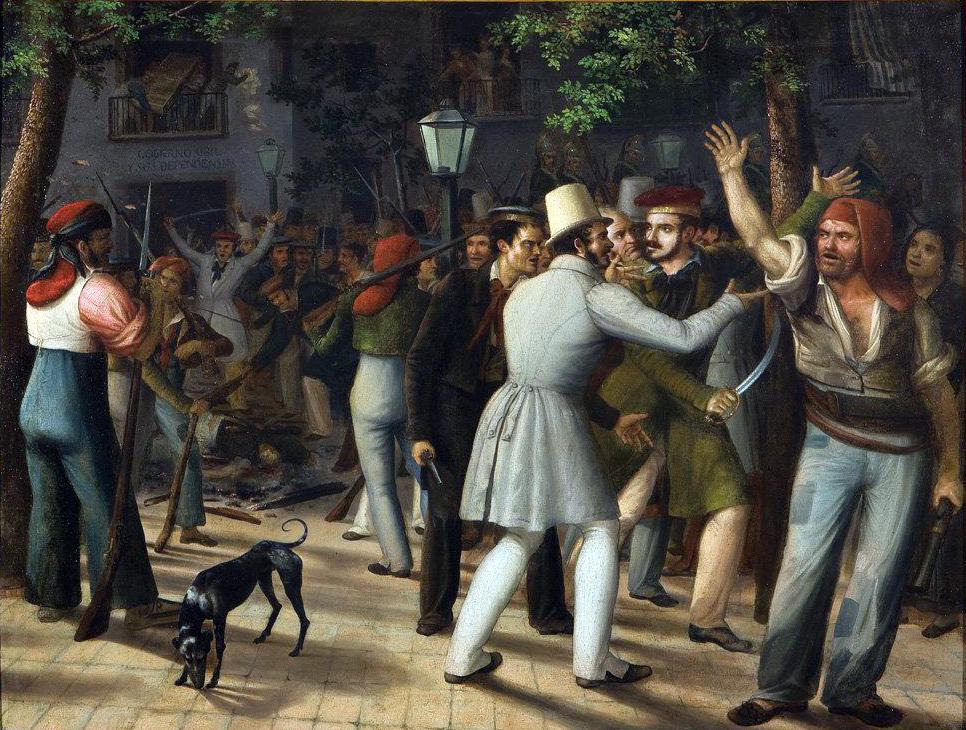
The riot (or bullanga) of August 5th, 1835. Museu d'Història de Barcelona.

The Factory was attacked and burned (and several defenders killed) on the night of 4 and 5 August 1835 during riots which were the result of a fatal combination of political passions and hatred of new machines. Not only had there been an outbreak of civil war over the monarchy, but there had been a recent cholera epidemic, an increase in unemployment and a growing labor conflict around wages.

From late July, a popular revolt took place, known as the Anti-clerical riots of 1835 or the Burning of the Monasteries that was directed against those institutions, such as the church or steam factories, which appeared as the symbols or the causes of popular misery. The Convent of Sant Josep (site of the current La Boqueria) was set on fire, then the convents of the Carmelites, the Dominicans (the current Santa Caterina Market, the Augustinians, the Franciscans (the current Plaça Duc de Medinaceli) and the Trinitarians (the current Liceu). The rage spilled over to industry and responsibility for burning the Bonaplata Factory (and another in Gràcia belonging to Vilaregut) has been laid at the feet of Luddite gangs.

Additionally, the confrontation at the Bonaplata mill was more violent than similar conflict had been in England due to the long reign of hand spinning and weaving in Catalonia and because of the sudden change: only equipment of the most advanced kinds was being imported. In England the change to mechanisation had come more gradually.

== Aftermath ==
The burning of the Bonaplata mill and the failure to compensate its owners was a particularly great blow to confidence and other companies became more secretive about their installations. Notwithstanding, between 1836 and 1840, 1,229 machines were imported to Barcelona, including 23 steam engines, 92 spinning machines and 966 Jacquard looms. By 1840, there were 201 horse-power of steam engines in operation in Catalonia, by 1846, 2,000 horse-power and by 1860 7,800 horse-power.

Almost from the date of the fire, the process dissolving the company began amid a falling-out of the owners. However it took over three years to be wound up. Bonaplata sought compensation from the Spanish government which he blamed for not having done enough to prevent the riot. Initially, the government tried to evade responsibility, but then asked the Cortes Generales (parliament) for permission to pay compensation, but in the end, compensation was not forthcoming.

The foundry was not significantly damaged in the fire and was soon returned to operation. The manager (and then shareholder) of the Bonaplata Factory Valentín Esparó, established a company to buy the foundry in 1838 and expanded his operation into making machinery for other industries. His company subsequently merged in 1855 with another to form La Maquinista Terrestre y Marítima which became Spain's largest machine manufacturer and which in turn was bought by Alstom in 1998.

== Bibliography ==
- Maluquer de Motes, Jordi (2019). "La revolució a Catalunya (1832-1935)" [The industrial revolution in Catalonia (1832-1935)]. Butlletí de la Societat Catalana d'Estudis Històrics [Bulletin of the Catalan Historical Studies Society] (in Catalan) (30): 125–179. doi:10.2436/20.1001.01.198.
- Nadal i Oller, Jordi (1983). "Los Bonaplata: Tres generaciónes de industriales catalanes en la España del siglo XIX" [The Bonaplatas: Three generations of Catalan industrialists in 19th century Spain] (PDF). Revista de Historia Economica [Journal of Iberian and Latin American Economic History] (in Spanish). 1 (1). Instituto Figuerola de História y Ciencias Sociales [Figuerola Institute of History and Social Sciences]: 79–95. doi:10.1017/S021261090001243X. S2CID 154578107.
- Núñez de Arenas, Manuel; Tuñón de Lara, Manuel (1979). Historia del movimiento obrero español [History of the Spanish labour movement] (PDF) (in Spanish). Barcelona: Nova Terra.
- Pérez i Núñez, Albert (2004). "La Maquinista Terrestre Y Marítima, Una Empresa Pionera De La Industrialització Barcelonina" [The Terrestrial and Maritime Machinery Company, A pioneering company of industrialization in Barcelona]. Barcelona Quaderns d'història (in Catalan) (11): 197–210.
- Sánchez, Alex (1999). "El proceso de disolución de la Sociedad Bonaplata, Vilaregut, Rull y Cía. (1835-1838)" [The dissolution process of Bonaplata, Vilaregut, Rull y Company (1835-1838)]. In Carreras, Albert; Gutiérrez, Miquel (eds.). Doctor Jordi Nadal, La industrialiszación y el desarrollo económico de España, Volumen II [Doctor Jordi Nadal, The industrialisation and economic development of Spain, Volume II]. Col·lecció Homenatges [Tributes Collection] (in Spanish). Vol. 17. University of Barcelona. ISBN 8447521451.
- Thomson, J.K.J. (1992). A distinctive industrialisation. Cotton in Barcelona 1728-1832. Cambridge University Press. ISBN 0-521-39482-1.
- Thomson, J.K.J. (2003). "Transferencia tecnológica en la industria algodonera catalana: de la indianas a la selfactina" [Technology transfer in the Catalan cotton industry: from chintz to self-acting mules]. Revista de Historia Industrial (in Spanish). 24.
