= History of the cotton industry in Catalonia =

History of cotton industry in Catalonia, Spain

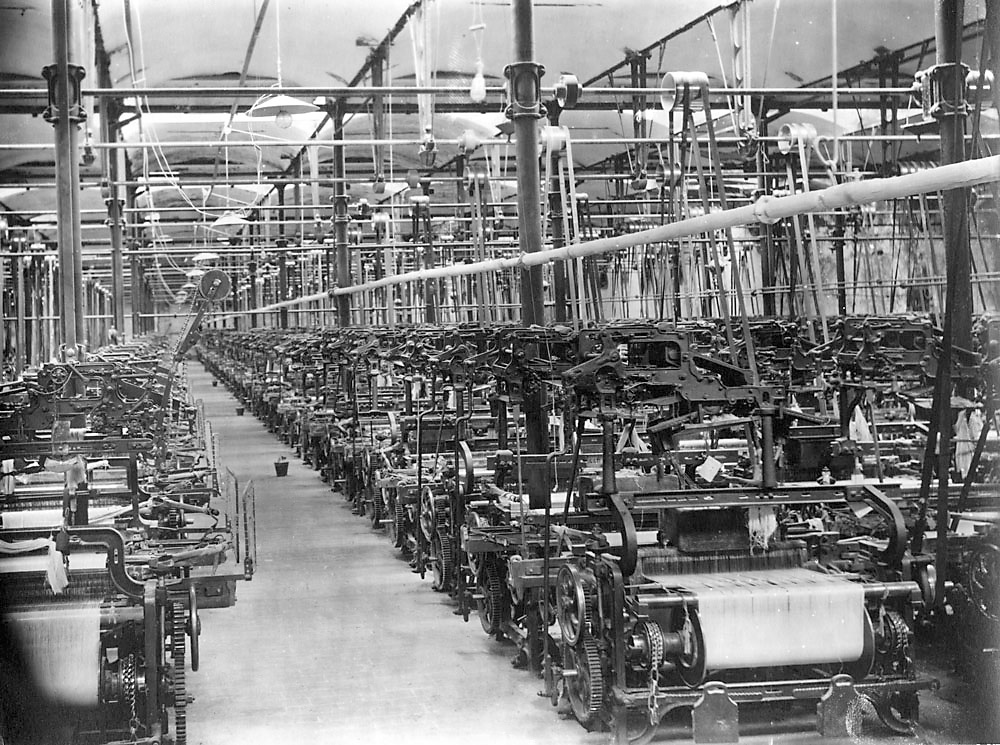
Weaving room at Colònia Sedó in Esparraguera about 1900 (MNACTEC, Manufacturas Sedó collection)

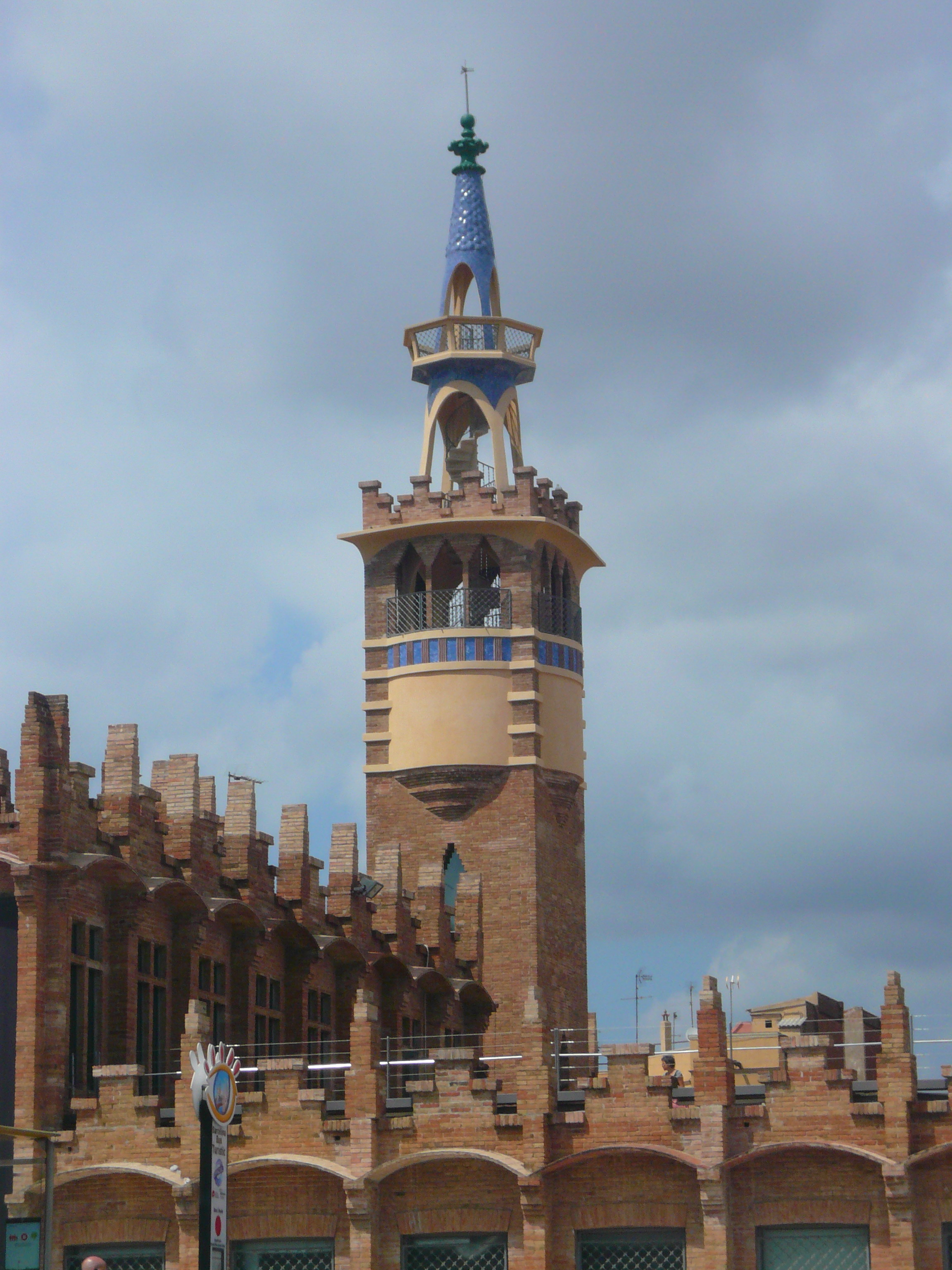
The Casarramona Factory - a jewel of modernisme

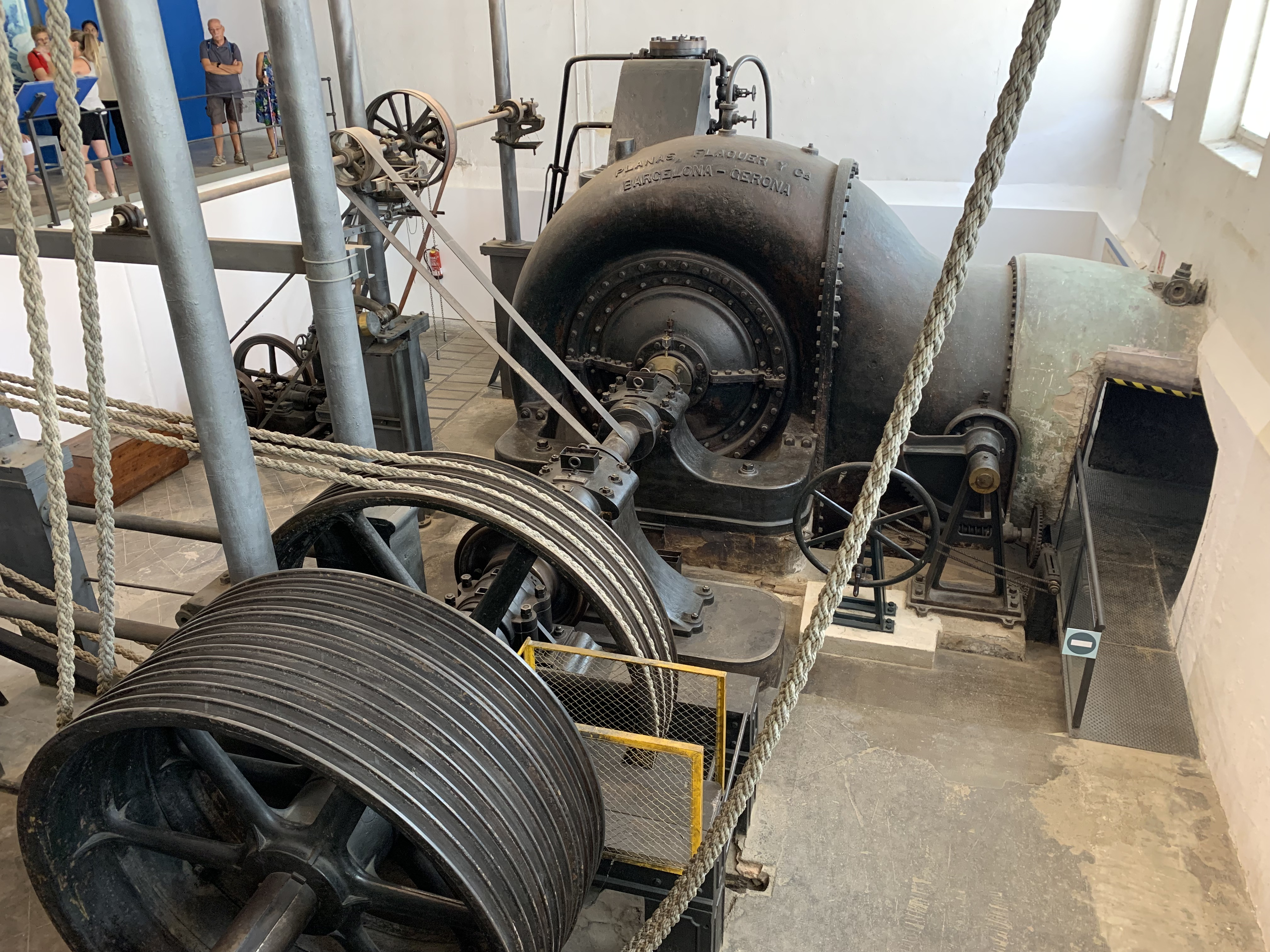
Francis-type hydraulic turbine commissioned in 1899 at the Colònia Sedó textile factory

The cotton industry was the first and leading industry of Catalan industrialisation that led by the mid-19th century to Catalonia becoming the main industrial region of Spain. It is the one Mediterranean exception to the tendency for early industrialisation to be concentrated in northern Europe. The Catalan cotton industry, in common with many European countries and the United States, was the first large-scale application of modern technology and the factory system.

The origins of this industry can be traced back to the early 18th century when it began producing printed cloth chintz, known as indianes locally. This was driven by government bans on imported chintz from India and the opening of trading opportunities with Spain's American colonies to Catalan merchants. Initially, spinning was not a significant part of this industry, but it gained momentum in the early 19th century with the introduction of British spinning technology. Industrialisation occurred in the 1830s after adoption of the factory system, and the removal of restrictions by Britain on the emigration of expert labour (1825) and of machinery (1842). Steam power was introduced, but the cost of imported coal and steam engines, led to a shift towards the use of water power from the late 1860s. Government policy saw the proliferation of more than 75 industrial colonies (Catalan: colònies industrials) on the rivers of rural Catalonia seeking water power, cheaper labour and land.

From the mid-19th century the industry was increasingly protected as the costs of raw cotton, energy & machinery in Spain made it difficult to compete globally. The industry came to rely almost entirely on the internal market and the remaining American colonies of Cuba and Puerto Rico. From the Great Depression, the industry declined. There was increasing strife in Spain, a declining economy, civil war and then from 1939, the policy of autarky locked the industry out of the post World War II global growth and investment. The opening of the Spanish economy in the 1960s, social changes that caused the industrial colony system to collapse and the oil shock of the 1970s saw the effective end of the industry.

The industry left a legacy of extraordinary architecture. The cotton magnates encouraged and funded the best modernisme architectural achievements, whether they were factories, private residences or apartment buildings. Often the buildings served as both the company headquarters and symbols of the owner's power, modernity and progressive spirit. They include Casa Batllo, Casa Calvet, Casa Terradas, Casa Burés, Palau Güell and the Church of Colònia Güell which is inscribed on the list of UNESCO world heritage. In addition there are outstanding factory buildings including Fàbrica Casaramona, Can Batlló (today called L'Escola Industrial), and the Aymerich factory in Terrassa which now houses the National Museum of Science and Industry.

The industrial colonies modernised and industrialised rural Catalonia and their infrastructure houses many modern museums. Many of the turbines installed in the (now closed) colonies, continue to supply electricity to the national grid. The colonies were also a powerful magnet attracting labour and spurring territorial population redistribution across the country, with implications for the politics of today.

== History ==
=== 1650–1736 The chintz revolution ===
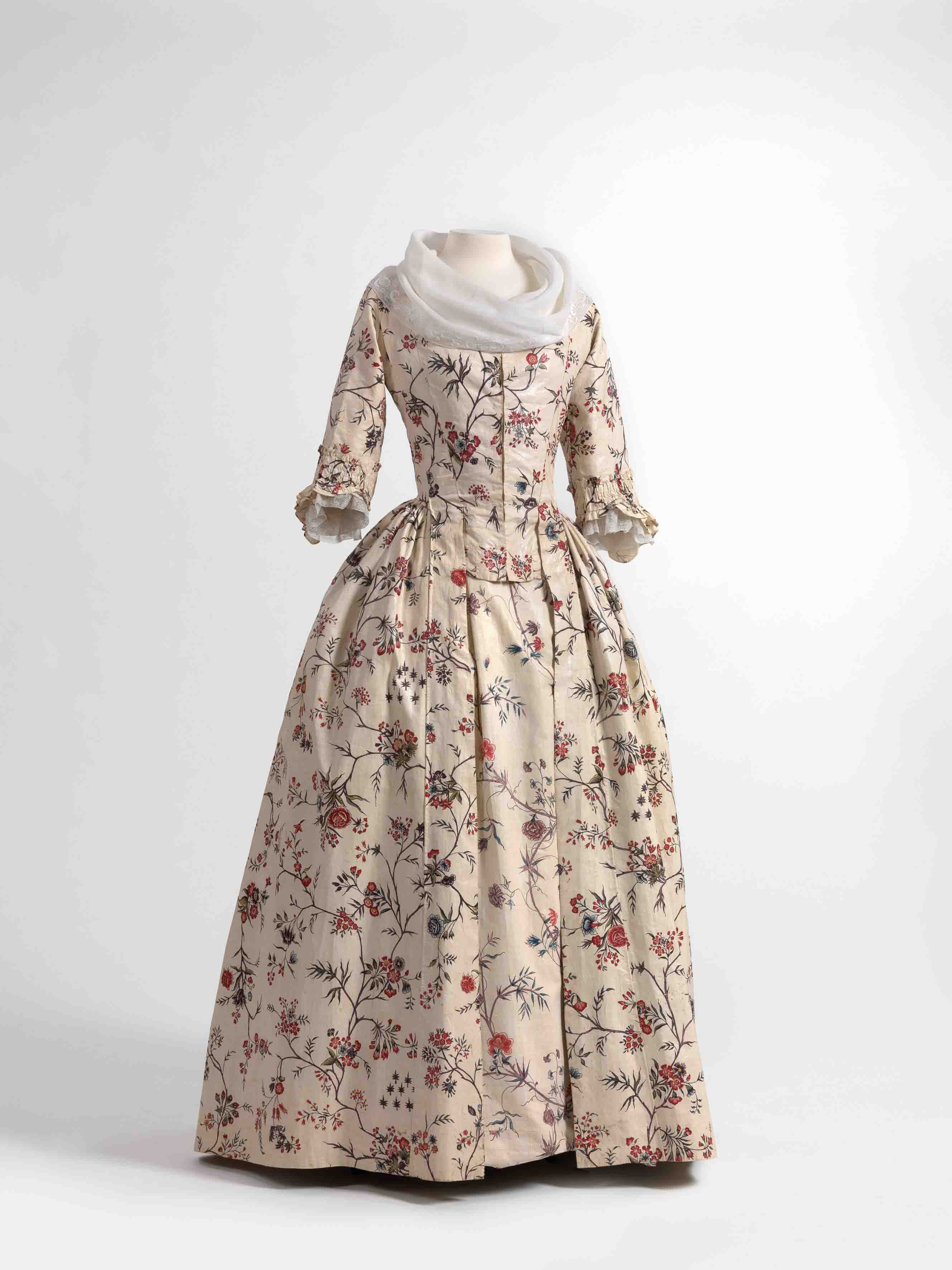
English dress in chintz, c. 1770–1790, Jacoba de Jonge Collection in the province of Antwerp, Fashion Museum

The first chintz or calicoes (Catalan: indianes) arrived in Barcelona about 1650 possibly as European re-export from Marseille, then Europe's principle route to India. The arrival of calicoes in Europe was nothing short of a revolution in garments due to increased comfort, hygiene, lower cost and irresistible colours relative to existing silk and woolen garments. Imports increased rapidly.

Spain, like England and France, banned calico imports. Firstly in 1717, Asian textiles were banned, probably as a result of complaints from Cádiz & Seville merchants about the Philippines ruining their own re-export business to Mexico. Then in 1728, a second edict banned the import of European made imitations of Asian textiles. However the edict also explicitly allowed spun yarn from Malta and granted freedom from guild regulation of printing, thereby revealing the objective of the edict, which was to encourage a local, import-substituting weaving and printing industry in imitation of England. Although there was no direct investment from the Spanish Crown unlike for wool, favouring an industry in this way was unique in Europe and an important factor in the Catalan cotton industry's rapid growth and eventual size.

=== 1736–1783 Chintz printing ===
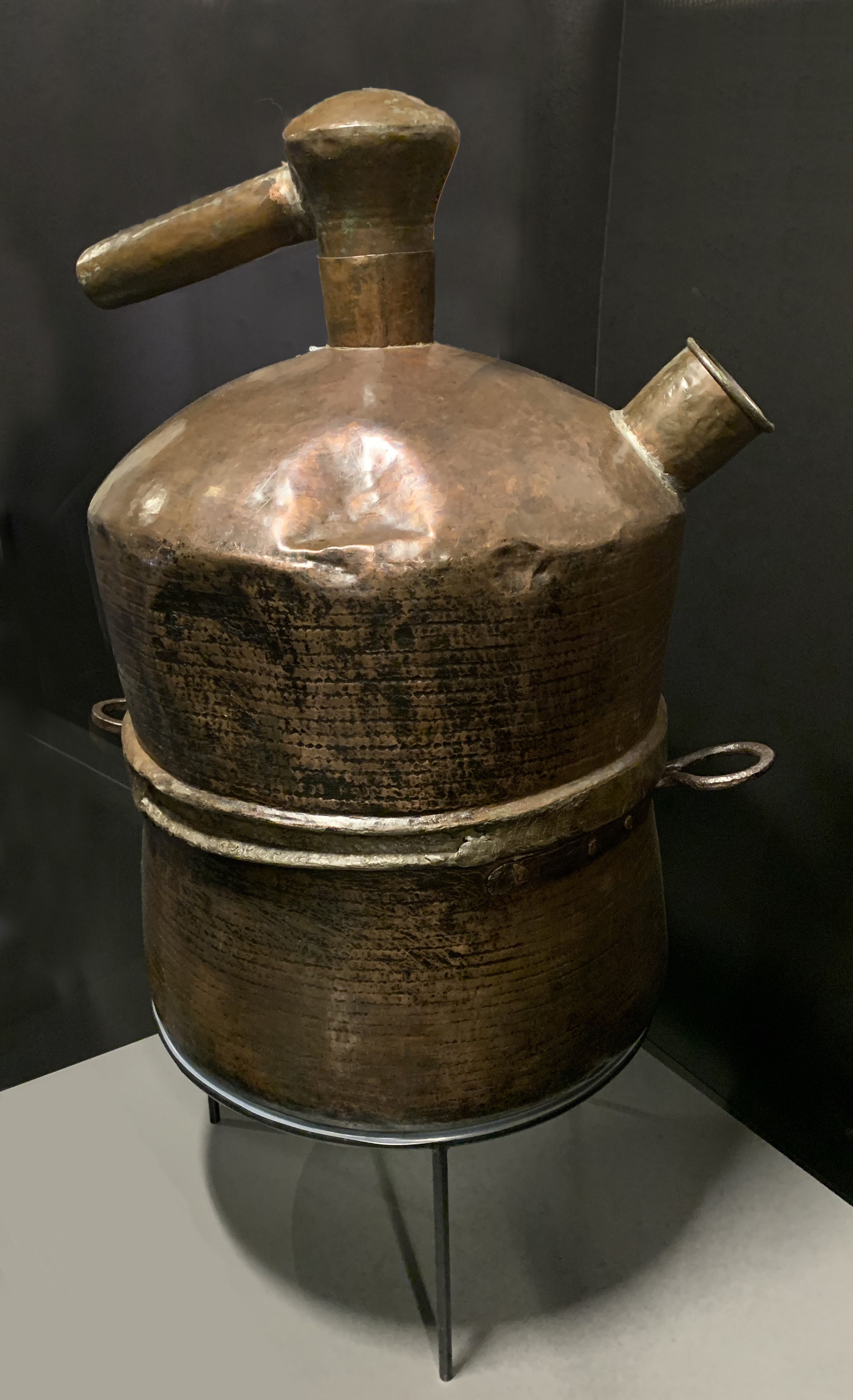
18th century Catalan still for producing brandy

The first printing in Barcelona, using the technique of wooden moulds or stamps, was on linen and occurred about 1736. In the early 18th century, linen cloth had begun to be imported from Amsterdam in exchange for brandy. As demand for brandy and wine to Northern Europe grew, this international trade provided the basis for the entire transformation of the Catalan economy and the textile industry in particular. Firstly, as viticulture became more specialised and profitable, the ensuing prosperity led to increasing demand for manufactured goods like printed cloth. Secondly, viticulture generated excess capital that could be invested in ship construction and increasing trade, importantly to the American colonies, in printing ventures (and later, as described in the next section, in machinery). This trade expanded through initiatives such as the Royal Barcelona Trading Company to the Indies and rapidly expanded in the last quarter of the 18th century after the ending of the Cádiz monopoly on trade with the Americas. Wine and brandy and increasingly printed cloth were exported and the return trade imported products that were inputs into the textile industry such as indigo and brazilwood amongst others Catalan merchants also invested heavily in the illicit slave trade to Cuba for "some decades" after 1814.

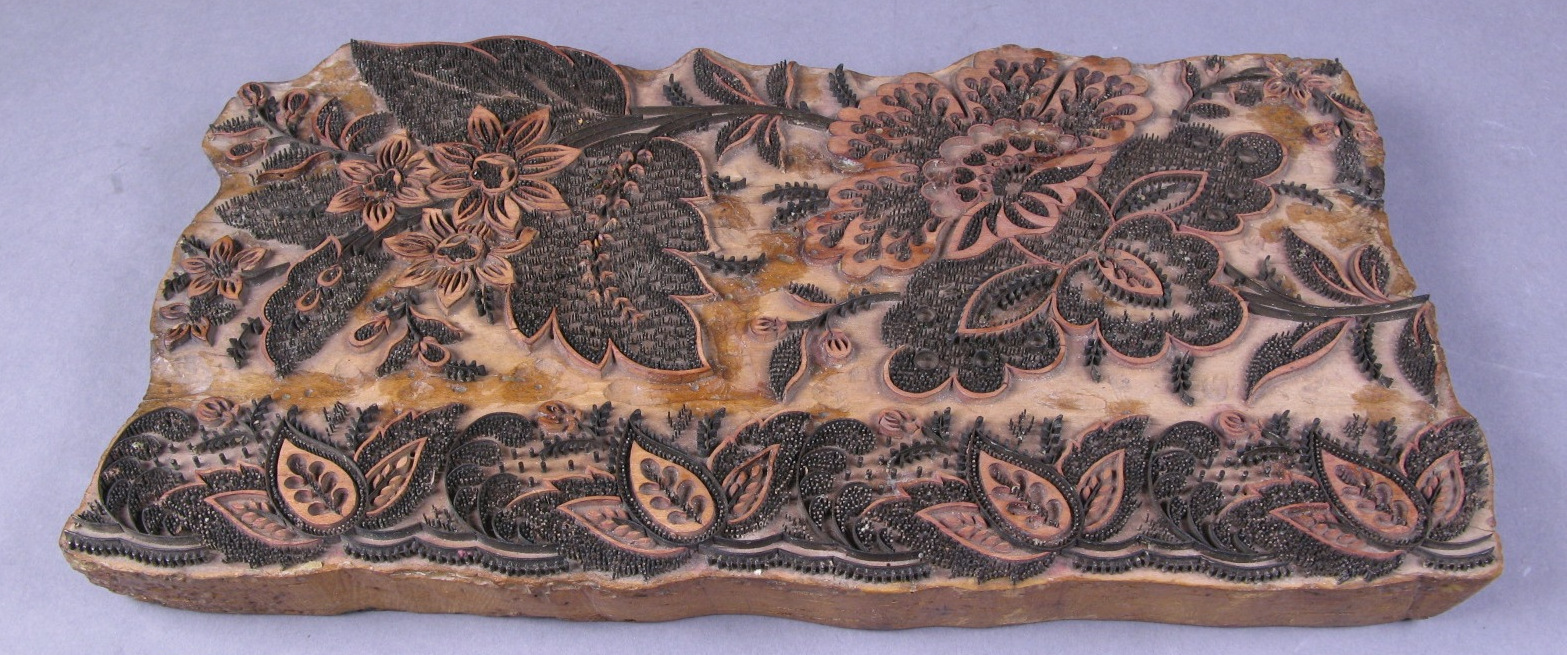
Wooden mould for printing chintz

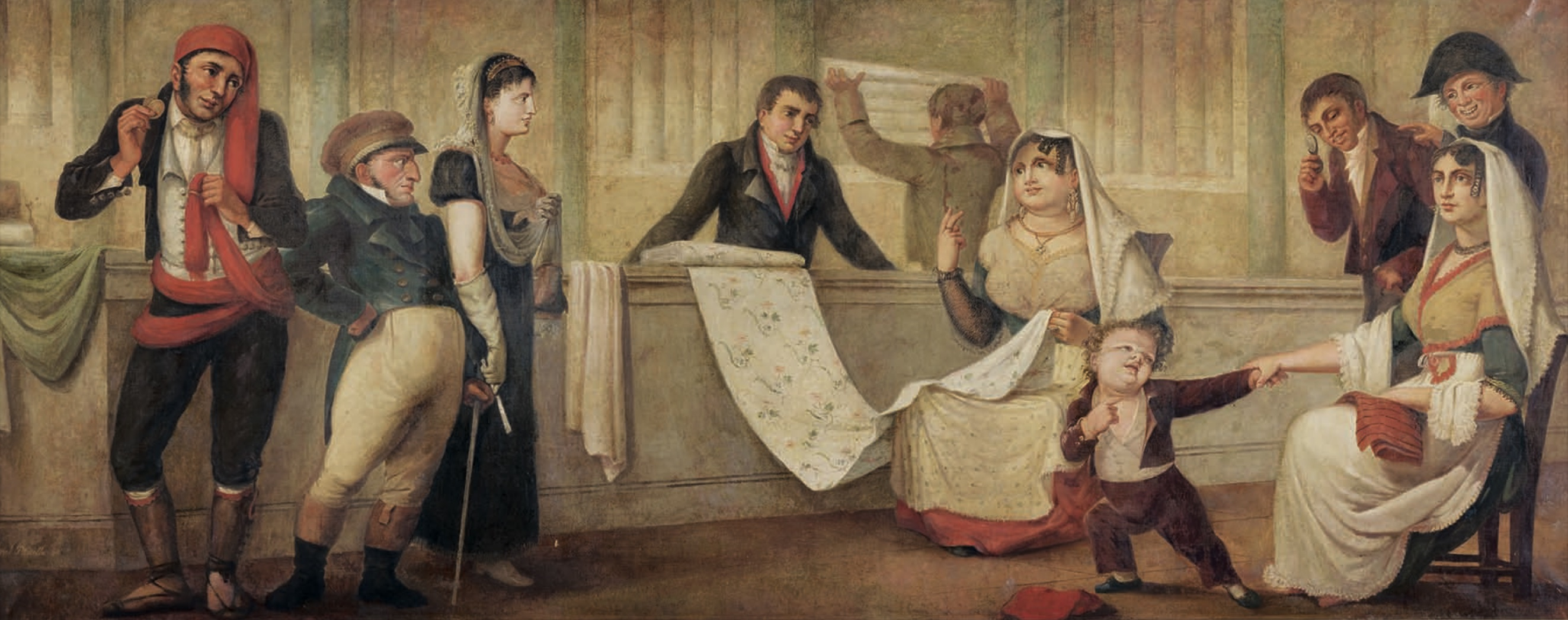
A chintz (indianes) shop in 1824

The protofactories were established by entrepreneurial merchants, shopkeepers or artisans who saw the booming market for chintz. Printing grew rapidly, stimulated by the period of rising population growth and prosperity in the second half of the 18th century that Spain enjoyed. Manufacturing took place in workshops that were built in the ground floors of buildings inside Barcelona's medieval walls in the Sant Pere neighbourhood where dying of cloth had been a traditional craft. Printing remained concentrated in Barcelona due to the existence of artisans of the medieval textile guilds which provided a workforce with appropriate skills, once they had learnt the techniques from immigrants from Marseilles, Hamburg and Switzerland. Training in engraving and drawing provided by the Escola de Belles Arts founded by the Royal Barcelona Board of Trade in 1775 was crucial for industry growth. The number of such printing shops rose from 8 in 1750 to 41 in 1770 to more than 100 in 1786, more than any other city in Europe. In Mataró, by the end of the 1740s there were 11 businesses and approximately 470 looms and a total labour force of 1300. This initial focus on printing can be contrasted with England, which, having banned pure cotton textiles but not the import of raw cotton, found its success in spinning and weaving (of linen/cotton mix).

=== 1783–1832 Proto-industry ===
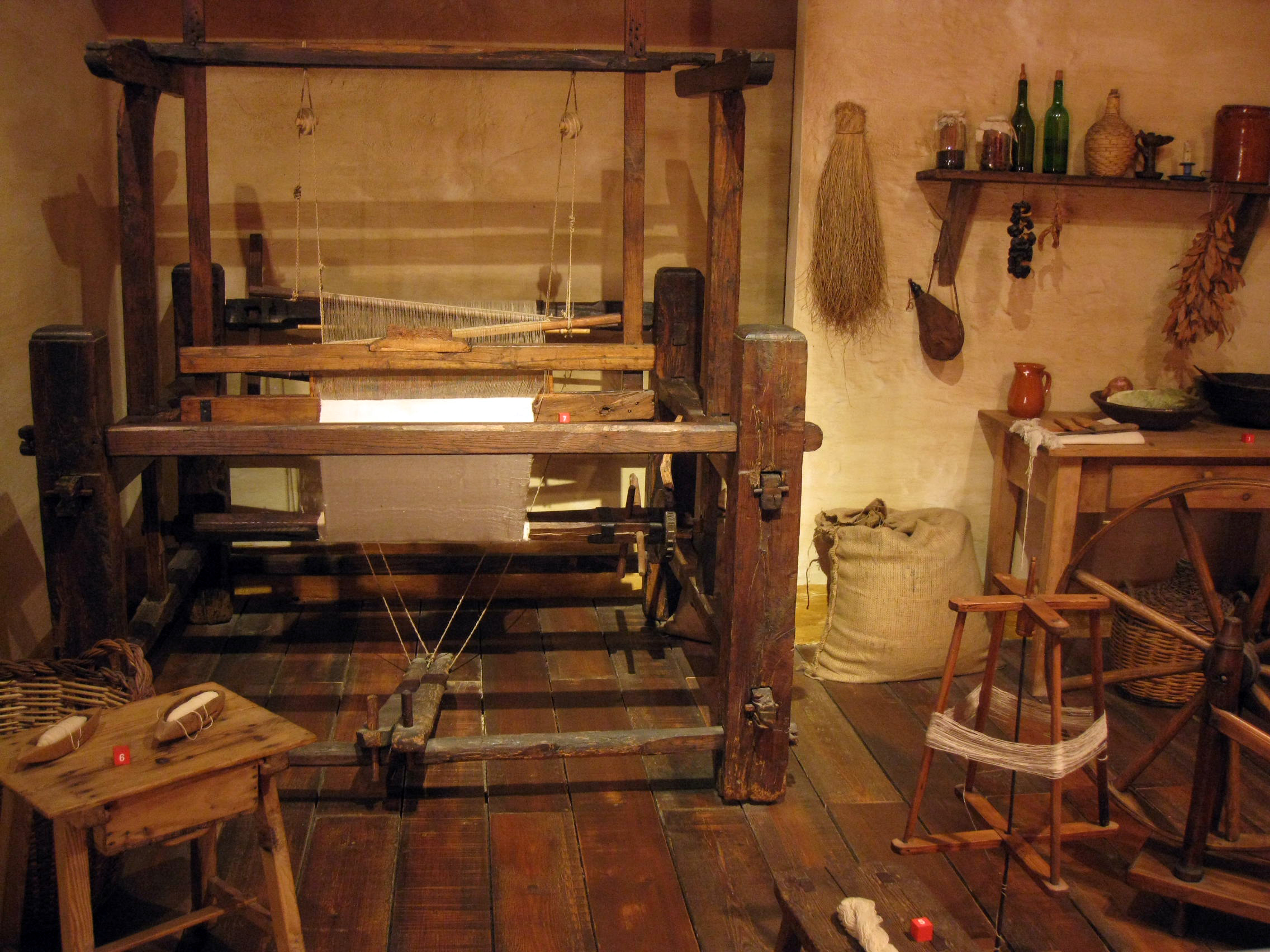
Catalan hand loom

This period is termed pre-industrial or proto-industrial because it is characterised by a gradual expansion in spinning and weaving through putting-out throughout Catalonia and included from around 1790 the first steps in introducing machinery which had been invented in England. Once introduced, the technology was widely and quickly adopted by small domestic workshops in cottages throughout the traditional textile areas of central Catalonia and the Pyrenean foothills.

The loss of maritime security as a result of wars between 1796 and 1825 severely dislocated colonial trade. These were the wars against Britain, the French occupation and the Spanish American wars of independence. Limited to the internal Spanish market, the cotton entrepreneurs opted for technological change through the adoption of British mechanical spinning machines to reduce costs and gain market share with respect other cloth manufacturing.

Although cotton spinning and weaving dates from the 1760s, it used traditional hand methods and did not really qualify as an industry until the 1790s. At the time most yarn arrived from Malta (made of Egyptian or Turkish cotton), but the British capture of Malta led to an 1802 royal edict banning the import of spun yarn, which forced the industry to become self-sufficient in spinning. Simultaneously. the growth in printing drove demand for spun yarn, which drove up wages and in turn drove adoption of spinning technology. From about 1806, the adoption of the more advanced British spinning mule was facilitated by the Treaty of Fontainebleu. which made it easy to purchase French copies of this technology.

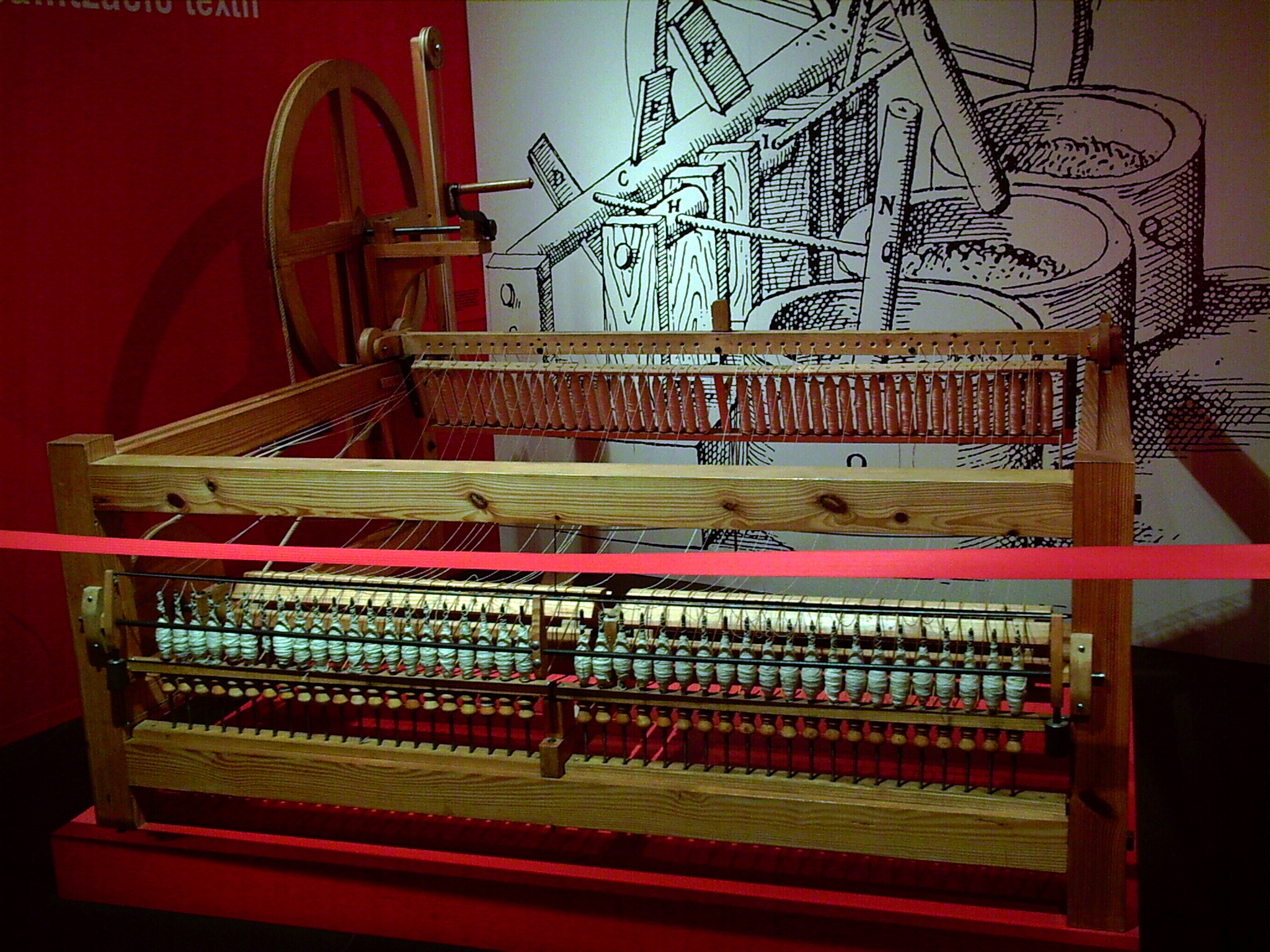
A Catalan made version of a spinning jenny called a Berguedana

Automation of the various processes can be seen from the dates of technology arriving in Catalonia. The first spinning jenny arrived in 1785 (21 years after its invention), the first water frame in 1793 (24 years after its invention) and the first spinning mule in 1806 (27 years after its invention). By 1820, the manufacture of cotton prints had only just returned to the 1792 level but now used local cotton yarn. By 1815. there were a total of 40 mules and jennies and by 1829 there were 410 mules and 30 jennies in Barcelona.

Unlike printing, which was centred in Barcelona, spinning spread to other parts of Catalonia, partly by the need for water power. Igualada became the most important spinning centre after Barcelona, followed by Manresa, which had 11 water-driven spinning mills by 1831. Weaving became even more widespread than spinning with concentrations (in descending order of importance) in Mataró, Berga, Igualada, Reus, Vic, Manresa, Terrassa and Valls. However, weaving was slower to mechanise, and by 1861, only 44% were mechanical. Printing also advanced in this period, with the cylindrical printing process being introduced in 1817.

The wars also interrupted the brandy trade with Northern Europe, and combined with the rise of competition in the production of spirits (whisky from Scotland, vodka from Russia), merchants instead developed a new market in brandy and wine to the United States, which encouraged raw cotton as a return trade. Still highly profitable, this trade provided the capital to purchase spinning and weaving machinery and later, the first steam engines. The new machinery increased demand for raw cotton. At the end of the 1830s the volume imported quadrupled (with respect to 1804) to about 5 million kilograms, principally from the United States and Brazil.

=== 1832–1861 The great leap ===
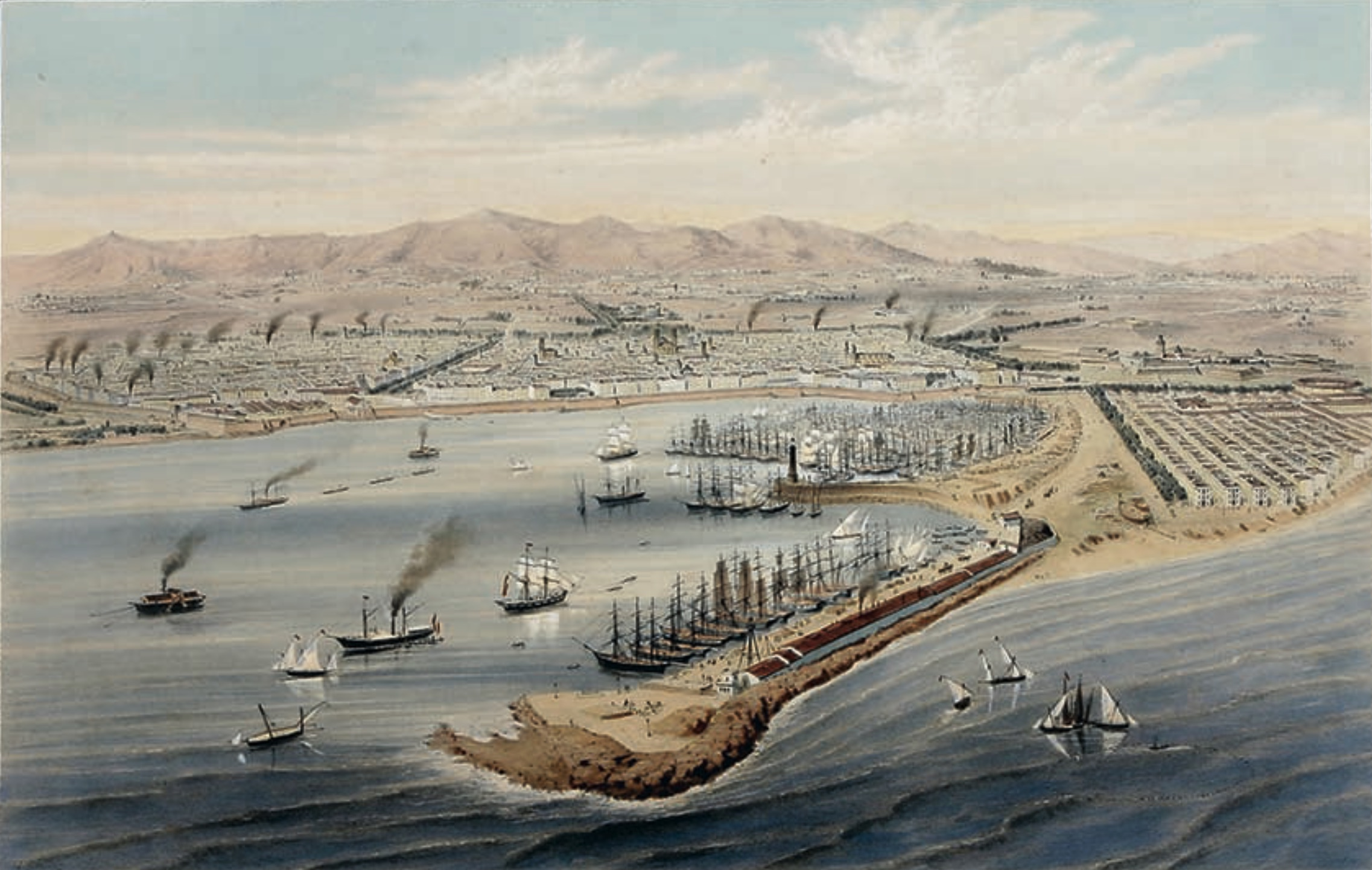
Barcelona 1856 with smoke from cotton factories clearly visible in Sant Pere to right and El Raval top left

The industrial era really began in 1833 with the installation of the first steam engine in Spain at the new Bonaplata Factory (also called El Vapor) made possible by the removal of restrictions by Britain on the emigration of expert labour in 1825. Contemporary writers termed the event as an industrial revolution, as it also used machines made of cast iron for the first time. The company was formed by men from three main sectors of the industry: import and manufacture of machinery (Josep Bonaplata i Corriol made extensive visits to England), printing (Rull) and spinning and weaving (Vilaregut).

The Spanish government agreed to support the company. The factory received a subsidy, the banning of all cotton imports and the right to import some materials and equipment duty-free. In return, the company promised to manufacture power looms and spinning machines for local purchase and to grant free access to any manufacturer wanting to learn the steam technology, essentially a technology transfer to the rest of the kingdom.

This period represented a great leap of industrialisation in which the mechanisation of the cotton spinning and weaving was simultaneous with the first pouring of cast iron, the nationalisation of lands held in mortmain and thus an increase in agricultural production, and a large increase in population. There was a new wave of general prosperity from higher wages, the repatriation of capital from the colonies after they won their independence and the adoption of factory system. Within a year of Bonaplata's formation, five more companies had raised the capital to import and install steam engines. Once Britain had removed its restrictions on machinery exports in 1842, its machine makers embarked on an export drive. By 1846 there were 80 steam engines operating.

The number of boats laden with raw cotton arriving in Barcelona from America skyrocketed from 12 in 1827 to 65 in 1835 to 197 in 1840, the vast majority from Cuba and Puerto Rico. By 1848, 11,000 tonnes of raw cotton were being used, five times more than in 1820. While in 1840 the majority of machinery was still turned by hand, at the end of the 1850s, almost 75% of spinning and 50% of looms were turned by steam engines.

From the late 1830s, the industry had outgrown the walled city of Barcelona, and the steam engines with their frequent explosions scared everybody. Soon, factories were being established in the villages of Gràcia, Sant Andreu, Sant Martí and Sants, which became the new industrial suburbs long before they were incorporated into greater Barcelona.

Industrialisation increased productivity and enabled a reduction in prices. By 1861, vertical integration predominated in the cotton industry (spinning, weaving and finishing in one factory) in order to gain economies of scale and efficiency. Whereas in 1840, Spanish textiles were 81% more expensive to British ones, by 1860, mechanisation had brought that down to 14%. The price of printed cotton in Catalonia dropped 69% between 1831 and 1859 and drove producers in other parts of Spain out of the market. For example, the price of linen cloth, primarily produced in Galicia, did not change over the same period and so the linen industry evaporated. At the same time, the cotton industry stimulated wool textile production in Sabadell, Terrasa and Manresa, with the consequent decline of the traditional woolen centers of Castille.

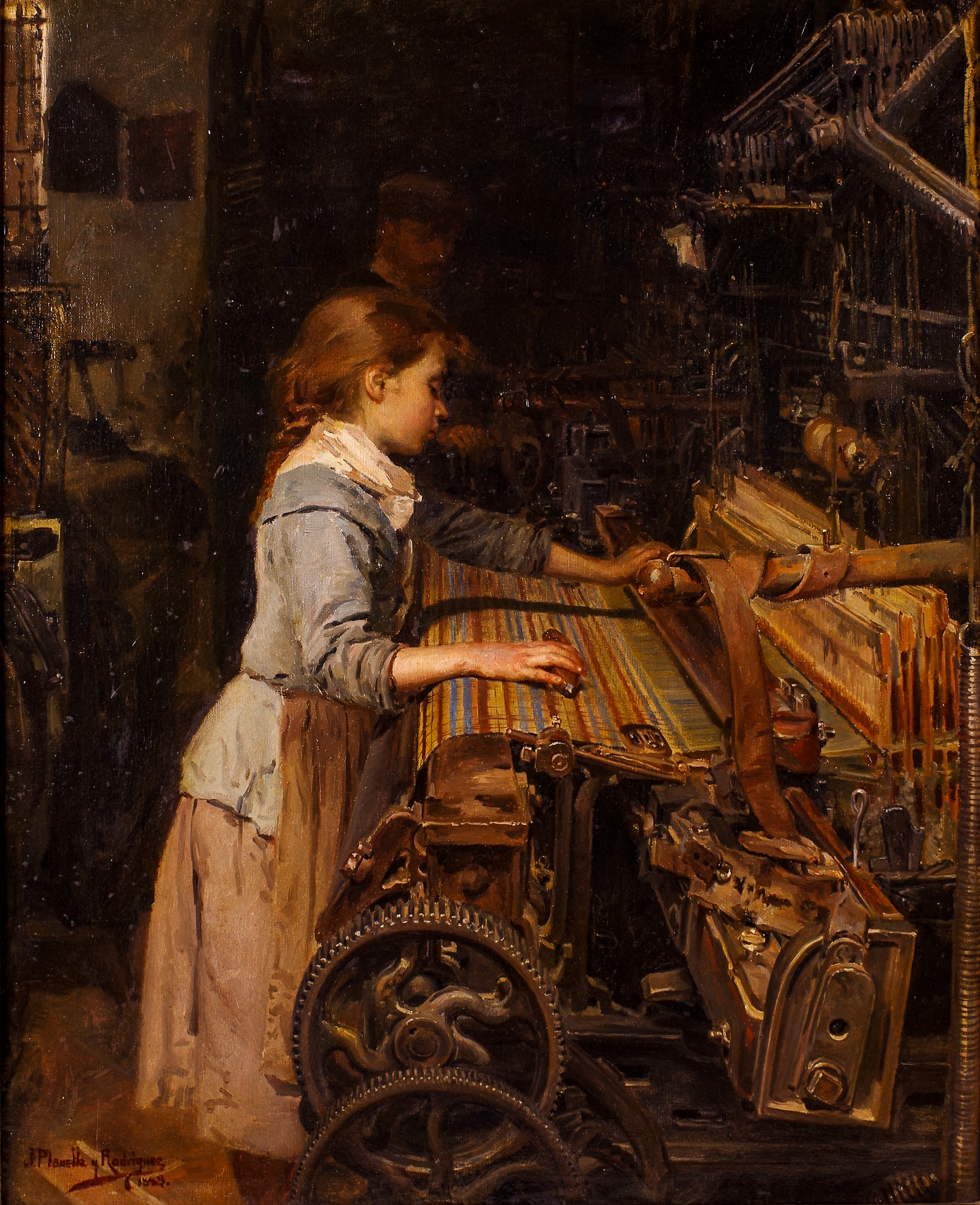
The little worker, a painting from 1885 depicting child labour in Catalonia

Industrialisation also implied social dislocation and conflict. In 1835, the Bonaplata Factory was attacked and burnt. In 1839 the first union in Spain was formed, the Barcelona Weavers Association. In 1842 there was a revolt in Barcelona against the free market policies of the Government which threatened industry and workers. Between 1849 and 1862, wages dropped 11% with 54% spent of food alone, and life expectancy was 50 years for salaried workers and 40 for day workers. In 1854–1855, the Conflict of the selfactinas in Barcelona involved Luddite type action against the mechanisation of spinning facilitated by the "self-acting" or automatic spinning machines that was blamed for the forced unemployment of many workers. They burnt factories and demanded the removal of the spinning machines, reduced hours and a right to a minimum wage. The action led to the first general strike in Spain.

In spite of industrialisation, the industry was finding it difficult to compete with foreign importers and called for tariff protection. A persistent problem was the higher cost of raw materials and machinery. From 1830 to 1844, the cost of raw cotton was on average 47% higher in Barcelona than New York and 28% higher than Liverpool. Coal prices in Barcelona were 76% higher than in Britain, largely because of shipping costs (from Britain) and tariffs. Machinery and parts were also imported from Britain and were up to three times more than in Britain for the same reasons. On the other hand, wages in Catalonia were about 15% cheaper than Lancashire. Additional problems were the extent of contraband entering the country and the smaller scale and lower productivity with respect to the British cotton industry, which meant that without protection, the Catalan industry probably would have succumbed to British competition as had Portugal's textile industry. As a result, growth would now come from a protected internal market.

=== 1861-1882 Industrial colonies ===
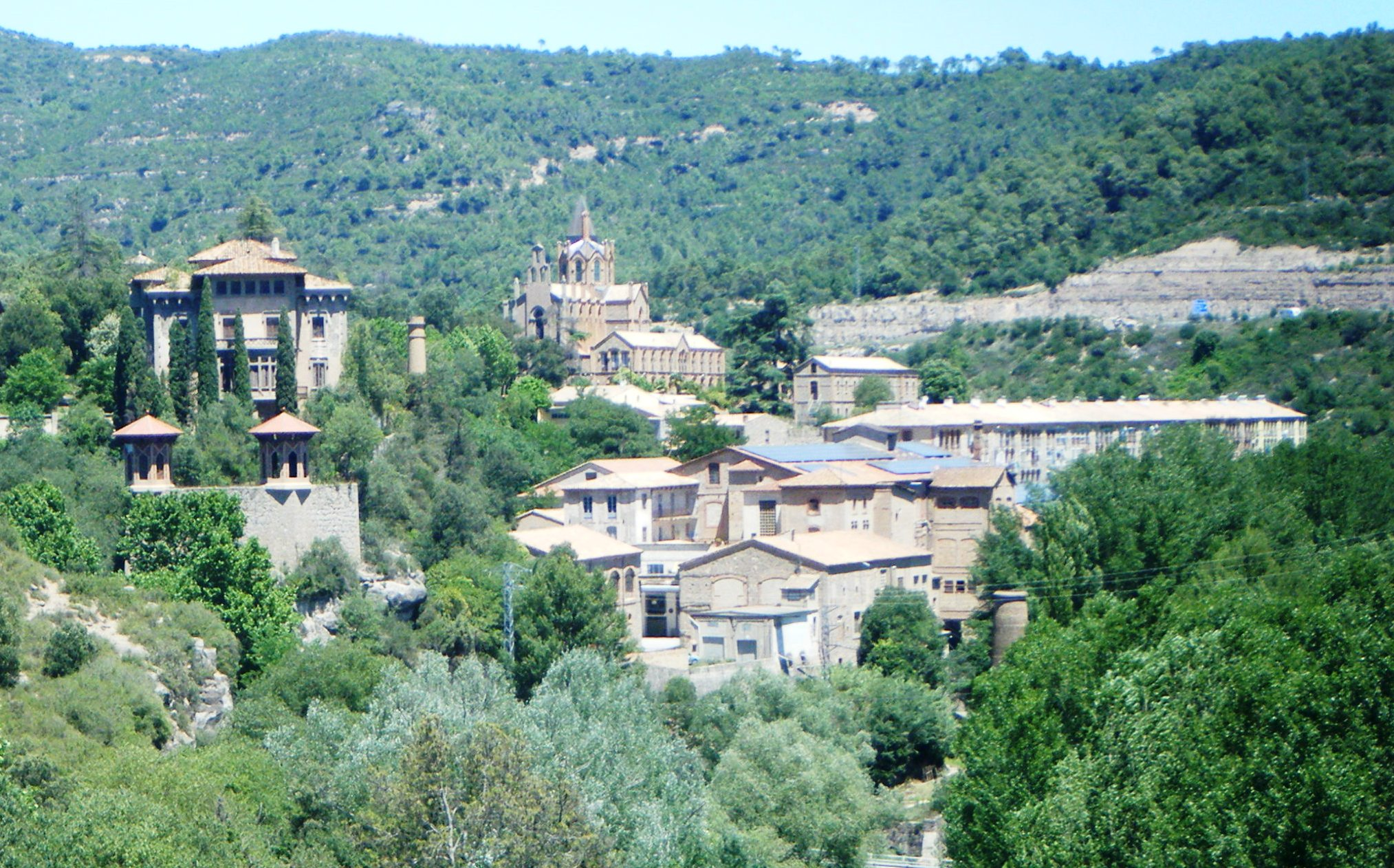
Cal Pons, a textile company town, or industrial colony, in Puig-reig

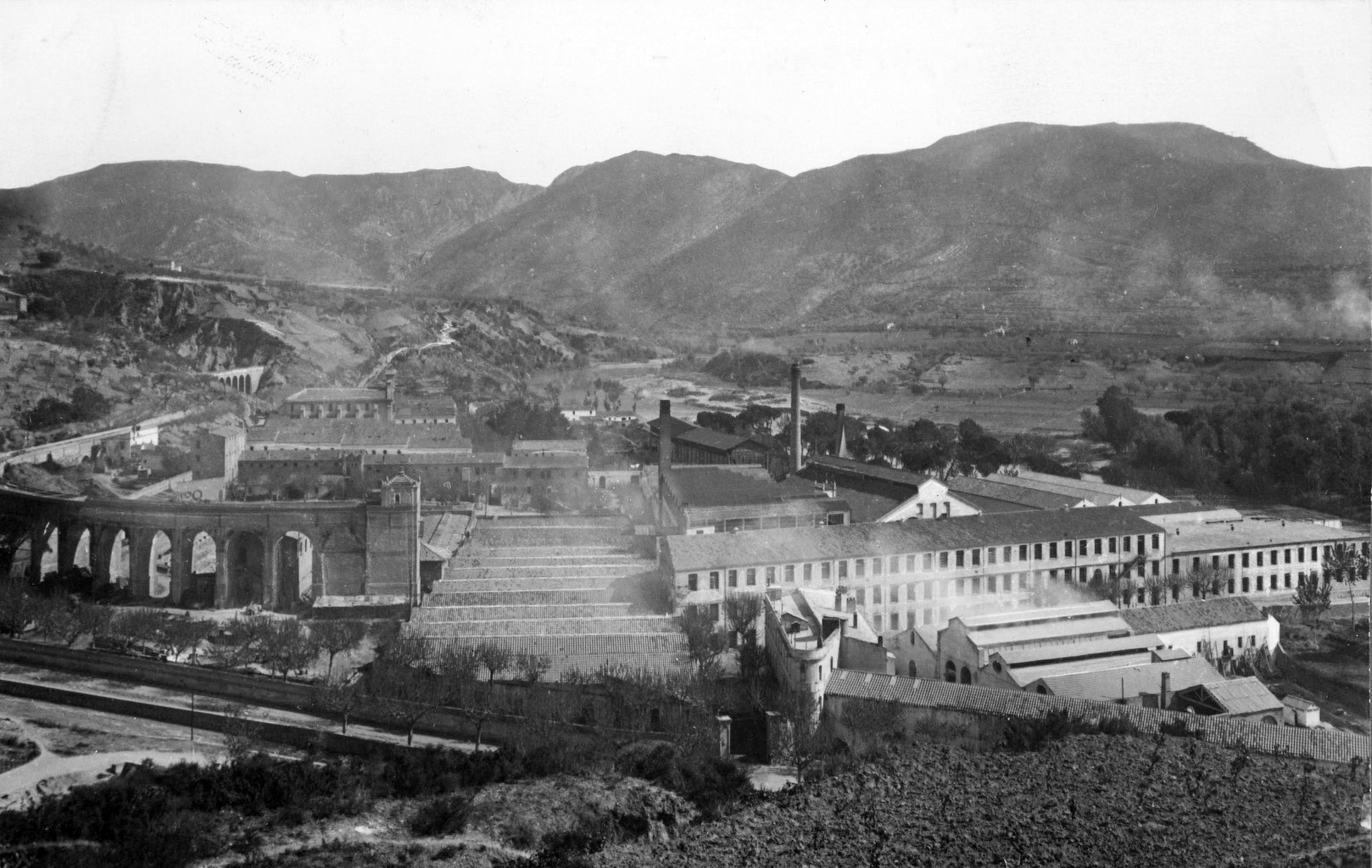
Colònia Sedó industrial colony about 1930

A series of laws in the 1850s and the 1860s saw an expansion of the industry to rural Catalonia stimulated by the possibility of reducing costs. Although the goal of the Agricultural Colonies Acts of 1855, 1866 and 1868 was to transform and modernise the Spanish countryside, industrial colonies would be covered by the Acts (and therefore exempt from industrial taxes for 10–25 years and workers exempt from military service) if they were established in rural areas. Of the 142 industrial colonies around Spain that benefited from the Acts, 26 were textile companies, the second-highest number, after agro-food industry, with 60 colonies. Of the 26, there were 15 located in the Province of Barcelona. Most of the 26 factories were vertically integrated and undertook the entire range of cotton processes.

In addition, the Water Acts of 1866 and 1879 allowed water to be used as a free energy source, which saved on imports of British coal, and also exempted any business that did so from paying industrial taxes for ten years. Some 17 Catalan industrial colonies benefited from the law.

Both initiatives, cheaper labour and land than in Barcelona, and abundant raw materials from which to build their factories, led to a high intensity of development of factories along the rivers, perhaps the highest in Europe. Even more colonies were built in the 1870s, after the American Civil War had ended, and raw cotton once again became readily available. The high concentration in the Ter and the Llobregat Rivers meant that railways could be constructed profitably and from about 1880 linked local coal mines to industrial colonies, reduced the cost of supplying cotton to them and provided a cheaper means to bring the textiles to market. In all, some 100 industrial colonies were built in Catalonia of which 77 were textile factories, and most of them were for cotton.

=== 1882–1898 Protected trade with the Antilles ===
As over production become increasingly common and as domestic demand was inelastic, the textile industry lobbied government for more protection. The 1882 Commercial Relations with the Antilles Act effectively declared the colonies of Cuba, Puerto Rico and the Philippines as cabotage for Spain and so those American colonies were effectively forced to buy Spanish products and could not be undercut by foreign goods.

There was a prevailing protectionist attitude of the Spanish governments of the period that united the interests of not only the textile but also the cereals and the iron and steel industries. The lack of democratic representation during the Restoration meant governments were less able to resist powerful sectorial interests, which resulted in global protection without regard to rising production costs or competitiveness of exports. The subsequent 1891 Canovas Tariff went beyond the 1882 Act and has been described by one author as the first step towards corporatism, state involvement in business and a rejection of competition as a norm in business, which led logically after 1939 to autarky.

Even so, at the time, tariffs were the primary source of government revenues around the world. Protectionism was proliferating in Europe. Elements of British society advocated the reintroduction of tariffs and an exclusive trade bloc. In the United States, a protectionist philosophy prevailed from after the Civil War until the 1930s. The Wilson–Gorman Tariff Act imposed tariffs on sugar from Cuba, its main export, and cancelled a trade agreement with Spain that had reduced tariffs on food from the US to Cuba. Combined with the effect of the Spanish cabotage laws, the actions of the United States reignited the Cuban War of Independence within a few months and very soon resulted in Spain losing its last American possessions and, with it, the cotton market.

=== 1898–1930 Turning inwards ===
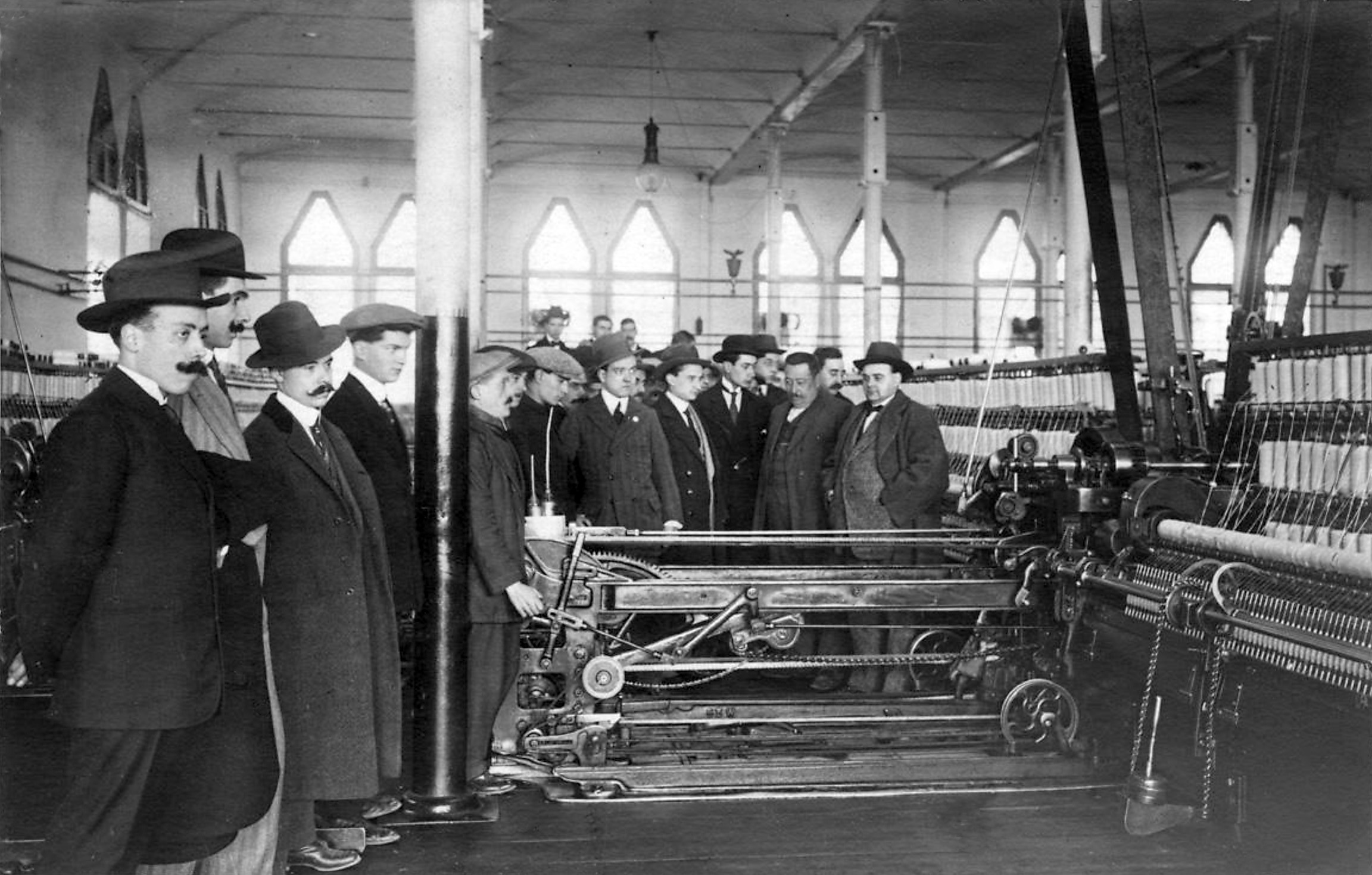
Students visiting the Fàbrica Trinxet in Barcelona in 1914 examining a self-acting spinning mule

At the loss of the American colonial market, the Catalan textile industry represented 56.8% of total Catalan manufacturing production and 82% of total textile production in Spain in 1900. Initially activity levels in the cotton industry fell drastically until 1903 and was complicated by the general strike of 1902.

In spite of the setback, for the first couple of decades of the 20th century, growth continued as a result of an expanding total and per capita Spanish national income and the expansion of the railway network, which had reduced costs to deliver products internally.

There were modest attempts to find new foreign markets, which in the ten years to 1913 grew at an average rate of just over 5%. A temporary boom also resulted during the First World War, especially by supplying France, but the subsequent peace saw 140 Catalan textile factories close and an estimated 20,000 put out of work.

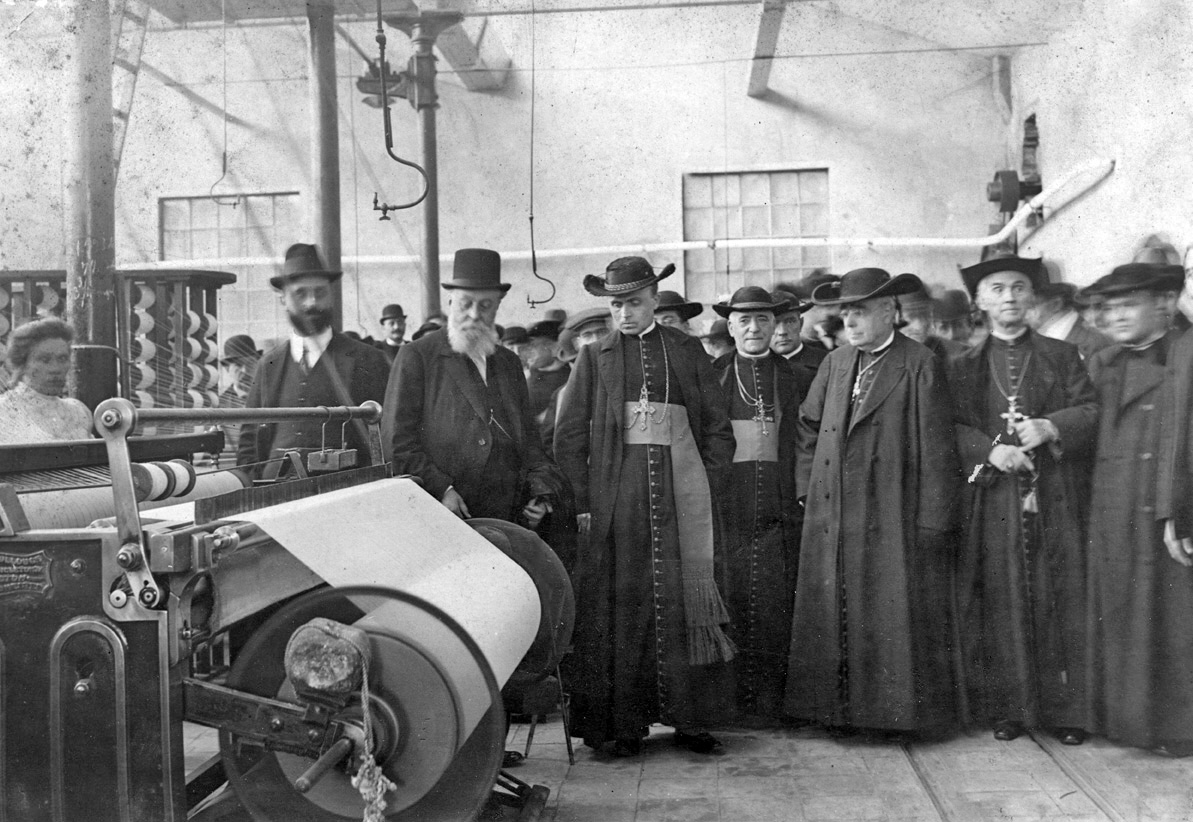
A visit to Colònia Güell in 1910 by the Bishops of Barcelona, Tarragona, Lleida, Vic and Valencia accompanied by Count Güell

However, a number of factors hindered expansion to foreign markets. Protectionist policies designed to protect grain production from Andalusia and Castile increased Catalan shipping costs in the Mediterranean. The earlier decision to choose a nonstandard railway gauge for military defence also proved an economic barrier to export.

Additionally, the legacy of being a protected market meant that Catalan companies lacked the sales and banking networks in foreign markets that they had in domestic markets and so were unwilling to take the risks they took domestically. They were thus reluctant to work through foreign distributors and ignored requests or demanded commercial conditions that made them completely uncompetitive. Instead, they viewed foreign markets as escape valves in times of overproduction. Consequently, they lost many opportunities to export their products and to build a feedback loop to improve their products or competitiveness. Finally, the Dictatorship of Primo de Rivera's monetary policy from 1923, had the effect of harming all Spanish exports.

=== 1930–1990 Decline and restructure ===
The Great Depression and the 1930s' political upheaval led to a steep decline in the Spanish economy. Catalonia sank into stagnation and atrophy. The Second World War completely disrupted the import of raw cotton from the Americas, and the economic policy of autarky, cutting off almost all international trade, ensured technological and managerial obsolescence and locked the industry out of the postwar global growth and reduced opportunities for additional capital. The general decline in salaries and difficulty in importing machinery before 1959 meant that the industry maintained low levels of mechanisation and productivity.

When Spain began to open its economy in the 1960s, the industry faced a different world and significant adjustment occurred. The British cotton industry had already declined significantly between the world wars. In the United States, polyester had been introduced in the 1950s, spandex was patented in 1959, Kevlar was produced in 1965, and synthetic fibres had surpassed natural ones for the first time in history by 1968. Developing countries had begun to focus on clothing in their process of industrialisation and so industry in developed countries became more capital intensive. New machines such as open-end spinning and weaving using shuttleless looms had replaced older technology in the United States. The European Commission had begun a process of opening the Common Market to developing world producers.

The industrial colony system had already began to collapse in the 1960s because of its inflexible (family-owned) capital structure and social changes such as the desire for workers to own appliances, cars or their own home; the declining influence of religion; and the opportunities offered by towns. By the 1980s and 1990s, almost all factories in those industrial colonies closed.

The government's 1969 Plan for the Restructure of the Cotton Textile Industry encompassed closing marginal companies, destroying outdated machinery and reducing the workforce, ideally by reallocation to new manufacturing sectors such as automobiles, metal processing, plastics, synthetic fibres and chemicals. Employment in the industry declined from 228,000 in 1958 to 133,000 in 1978. The cotton manufacturing industry suffered a major crisis as a result of the inflationary global 1973 oil shock and by 1980 could not compete with either "cheap" countries (Czechoslovakia, Hungary and Romania) or advanced places with lower production costs and higher productivity (Europe, the United States and Japan). Entry to the Common Market in 1986 resulted in more intense adjustment and so today, the industry employs 5,000.

La España Industrial provided bookends to the industry. It was not only the first joint-stock company (Spanish: sociedad anónima) formed in Spain for cotton manufacturing but also the first to encompass spinning, weaving and finishing under one roof. It was formed in 1847, grew to 2,500 employees in late 19th century, consolidated factories in the 1960s and finally closed its doors for good in 1981. Can Batlló stopped textile production in 1964 and Colònia Güell was closed in 1973. Colònia Sedó, which had been the largest such industrial colony in Spain in the 1930s, closed in 1980.

== Bibliography ==
- "El Sector Algodonero" [The Cotton Sector]. AITPA - Asociación Industria Textil Algodón (in Spanish).
- "The European Union, Spain, and the Catalan Question: An Affair Beyond the Spanish Border?". EuropeNow. February 1, 2018. Archived from the original on 2022-07-21.
- Alonso, Ignacio (28 November 1980). "La industria textil sedera española denuncia la importación de productos a precio de 'dumping'" [The silk textile industry denounces dumping]. El Pais (in Spanish).
- Atkins, Edwin F (1908). "Tariff Relations with Cuba-Actual and Desirable". The Annals of the American Academy of Political and Social Science. 32 (2): 57–65. doi:10.1177/000271620803200209. ISSN 1552-3349. JSTOR 1010752. S2CID 154237864.
- Baró Tomàs, Ezequiel; Villafaña Muñoz, Cinthya (2009). La nova indústria: el sector central de l'economia catalana [The new industry: the central sector of the Catalan economy]. Papers d'Economia Industrial (in Catalan). Vol. 26. Generalita de Catalunya. p. 320. ISBN 9788439379409.
- Carbonell Basté, Silvia; Casamartina Parassols, Josep (2003). Les fàbriques i els somnis. Modernisme tèxtil a Catalunya [Factories and Dreams – Textile modernism in Catalonia] (in Catalan). Tarrasa, Spain: Centre de Documentacio i Museu Textil. ISBN 978-84-921199-7-4.
- Carr, Raymond (1980). Modern Spain, 1875-1980. Oxford University Press. ISBN 9780192158284. OCLC 6555498.
- Dobson, John M (1976). Two centuries of tariffs. The background and emergence of the United States International Trade Commission. Washington: US Government Printing Office. OCLC 692526097.
- Fabregat, Victor; Granell, Francisco; Salmurri, Juan Antonio (1980). "Problemas actuales y perspectivas futuras del sector textil-confeccíon" [Current problems and future perspectives of the textile-clothing sector] (PDF). Papeles de Economia Española (in Spanish) (5). Madrid: Fundación para la investigación economica y social. ISSN 0210-9107.
- Fee, Sarah (2020). Cloth that Changed the World. Royal Ontario Museum. ISBN 9780300246797.
- Gutiérrez Medina, María Luisa (1994). "La España Industrial", 1847-1853. Un modelo de innovación tecnológica ["La España Industrial", 1847-1853. A model of technological innovation] (Thesis) (in Spanish). University of Barcelona. hdl:10803/2003. ISBN 9788469331736.
- Hughes, Robert (1999). Barcelona. Harvill. ISBN 1860466346.
- Lacuesta, Raquel (2017). "Catalan industrial architecture in the last quarter of the 19th century and first quarter of the 20th century". Catalan Historical Review. 10 (10). Barcelona: Institut d’Estudis Catalans. doi:10.2436/20.1000.01.132. ISSN 2013-4088.
- Maluquer de Motes, Jordi (2019). "La revolució a Catalunya (1832-1935)" [The industrial revolution in Catalonia (1832-1935)]. Butlletí de la Societat Catalana d'Estudis Històrics [Bulletin of the Catalan Historical Studies Society] (in Catalan) (30): 125–179. doi:10.2436/20.1001.01.198. ISSN 2013-3995.
- Martínez Galarraga, Julio; Prat, Marc (2016). "Wages, prices, and technology in early Catalan industrialisation". Economic History Review. 69 (2): 548–574. doi:10.1111/ehr.12127. hdl:2445/102823. JSTOR 43910580. OCLC 51439630.
- Muñoz, Juan; Alonso, Juan; Martín, Juan (2000). Involución y autarquía: la economía española entre 1890 y 1914 [Regression and autarchy: the Spanish economy between 1890 and 1914] (in Spanish). Editorial Complutense. ISBN 84-7491-690-9.
- Martínez Shaw, Carlos (1974). "Los orígenes de la industria algodonera catalana y el comercio colonial" [The origins of the Catalan cotton industry and trade]. In Nadal, Jordi; Tortella, Gabriel (eds.). Agricultura, comercio colonial y crecimiento económico en la España contemporanea [Agriculture, colonial trade and economic growth in contemporary Spain] (in Spanish). Barcelona: Editorial Ariel. ISBN 8434465043.
- Martínez Shaw, Carlos (1981). Cataluña en la carrera de Indias [Catalonia in the race for the Indies] (in Spanish). Barcelona: Editorial Crítica. ISBN 84-7423-157-4.
- Nadal i Oller, Jordi (1973). The Failure of the Industrial Revolution in Spain, 1830-1914. The Fontana Economic History of Europe. Vol. 4. Collins/Fontana. pp. 538–616. ISBN 0006328415. OCLC 83383734.
- Nadal i Oller, Jordi; Benaul, Josep M.; Sudrià, Carles, eds. (2012). Atles de la industrialització de Catalunya [Atlas of the industrialisation of Catalonia] (in Catalan). Vicens Vives. ISBN 978-84-682-0758-2.
- Núñez de Arenas, Manuel; Tuñón de Lara, Manuel (1979). Historia del movimiento obrero español [History of the Spanish labour movement] (PDF) (in Spanish). Barcelona: Nova Terra.
- Prat, Marc; Soler, Ramon (2002). "La formación de redes comerciales y el fracaso de la penetración internacional de los tejidos catalanes, 1850-1930" [The formation of commercial networks and the failure of the international penetration of Catalan fabrics, 1850-1930]. Revista de Historia Industrial [Journal of Industrial History] (in Spanish). 21. Barcelona: University of Barcelona: 201–225. ISSN 1132-7200.
- Pollard, Sidney (1981). The peaceful conquest: the industrialisation of Europe, 1760-1970 (1st ed.). Oxford. ISBN 9780198770930. JSTOR 43910580. OCLC 6813872.
- Ringrose, David (1996). Spain, Europe and the Spanish Miracle, 1700–1900. Cambridge University Press. ISBN 0521646308. OCLC 42417432.
- Robinson, Joan (1979). Aspects of Development and Underdevelopment. Cambridge: Cambridge University Press. ISBN 0521226376.
- Rosés, Joan Ramon (1998). The Early Phase of Catalan Industrialisation, 1830-1861 (PhD thesis). Florence: European University Institute. doi:10.2870/804492.
- Rosés, Joan Ramon (2004). "Regional Industrialisation without National Growth: the Catalan Industrialisation and the Growth of Spanish Economy (1830-1861)". Revista de História Industrial. 25. University of Barcelona: 49–80. ISSN 1132-7200.
- Sáez Garcia, Miguel Ángel (2005). Aranceles e industria. El arancel de 1891 y sus repercusiones sobre el desarrollo de la industria española [The tariff of 1891 and its repercussions for the development of Spanish industry]. VIII Congreso de AEHE (in Spanish). Santiago de Compostela: Asociación Española de História Económica. Archived from the original on 2023-08-27.
- Sánchez, Alex (2013). Indianes 1736-1847. Els orígens de la Barcelona industria [Chintz 1736-1847. The origins of industrial Barcelona] (PDF) (in Catalan). Museu d'Història de Barcelona. p. 181. ISBN 978-84-940813-4-7.
- Sánchez, Alex; Valls Junyent, Francesc (2015). "El mercado del algodón en Barcelona durante la crisis del Antiguo Régimen, 1790-1840" [The cotton market in Barcelona during the crisis of the Old Regime, 1790-1840]. Revista de Historia Industrial (in Spanish). 58. ISSN 1132-7200.
- Serra, Rosa (2011). "Industrial colonies in Catalonia". Catalan Historical Review. 4 (4). doi:10.2436/20.1000.01.53. ISSN 2013-407X.
- Thomson, J.K.J. (1989). "The Catalan Calico-Printing Industry Compared Internationally". Anuari de la Societat Catalana d'Economia. 7. Societat Catalana d'Economia: 72–95. OCLC 1233047478.
- Thomson, J.K.J. (1992). A distinctive industrialisation. Cotton in Barcelona 1728-1832. Cambridge University Press. ISBN 0-521-39482-1.
- Thomson, J.K.J. (2003). "Transferencia tecnológica en la industria algodonera catalana: de la indianas a la selfactina" [Technology transfer in the Catalan cotton industry: from chintz to self-acting mules]. Revista de Historia Industrial (in Spanish). 24. ISSN 1132-7200.
- Valls Junyent, Francesc (2004). La Catalunya atlàntica: aiguardent i teixits a l'arrencada industrial catalana [Atlantic Catalonia: brandy and textiles at the beginning of the catalan industrialisation] (in Catalan). Vic: Eumo Editorial. ISBN 84-9766-044-7.
