= La España Industrial =

Spanish cotton factory (1847–1981)

Coordinates: 41°22′39.23″N 2°8′22.16″E

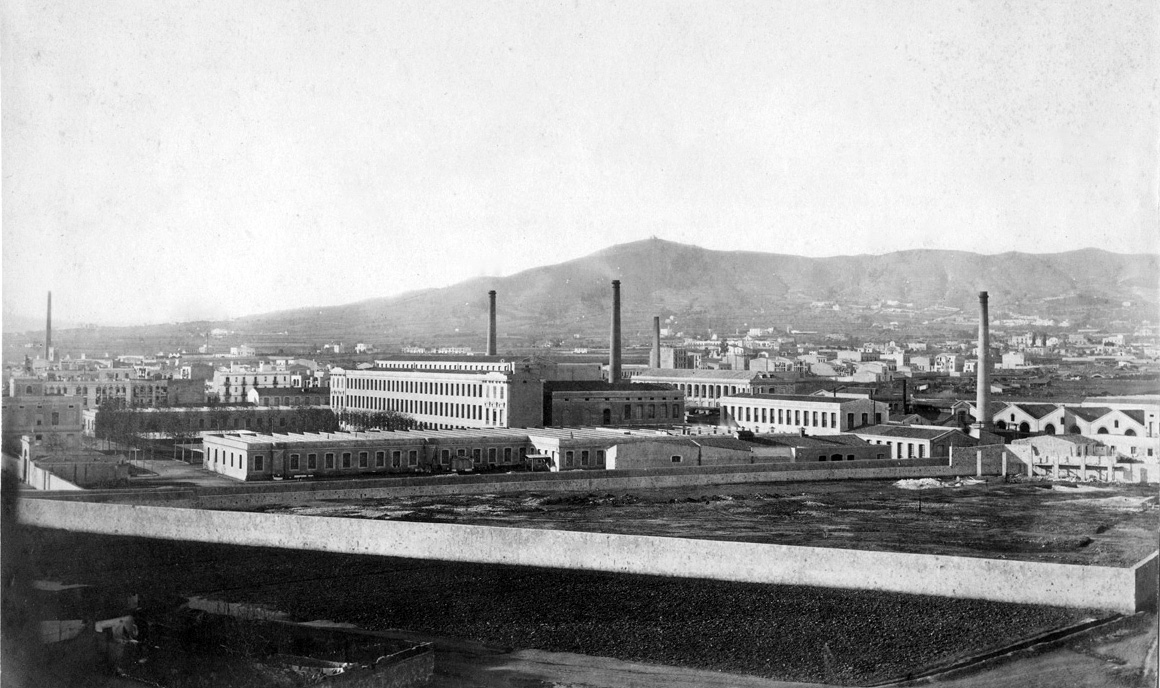
Photo of the Sants factory about 1870

La España Industrial (Catalan: L'Espanya Industrial), was a cotton textile company that was founded in 1847 and built its primary factory (known as Vapor nou) in the village of Santa María de Sans (modern day Sants). It was not only the first joint-stock company (Spanish: sociedad anónima) created in Spain for cotton manufacturing but also the first company to undertake all aspects (carding, spinning, weaving and finishing) under one roof. It was for many years, the largest and most innovative cotton manufacturer in Spain. It was formed in 1847, grew to 2,500 employees in late 19th century, consolidated factories in the 1970s and finally closed its doors for good in 1981.

== History ==
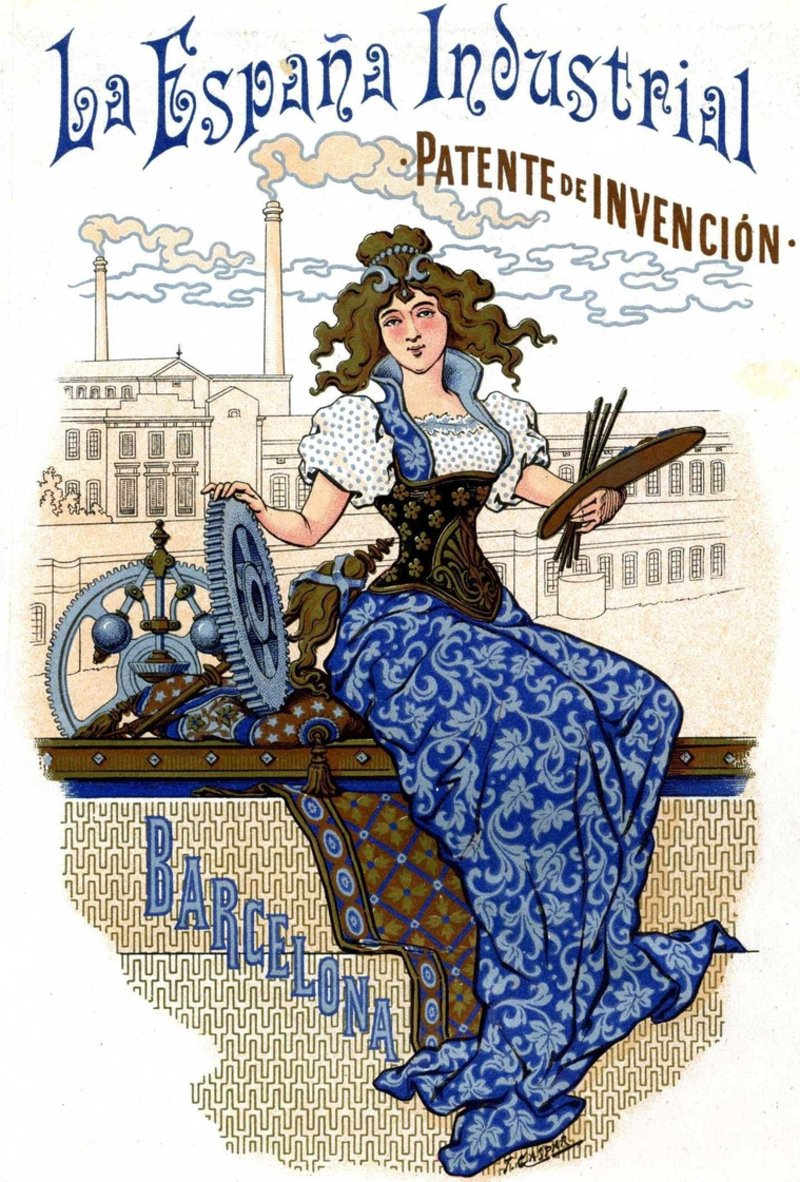
Advertising poster for a patent published by La España Industrial

The company was founded on January 28, 1847 by the Muntadas family from Igualadina. Although initially incorporated in Madrid, the company moved its domicile to Barcelona in 1851.

The primary manufacturing facilities were built in the village of Santa María de Sans, outside Barcelona as part of a general trend in the cotton industry which had outgrown the walled city. The steam engines and self-acting spinning machines were bought from Manchester in England, wood for construction from Charleston in the United States and printing machines from Mulhouse (Alsace). As was normal at the time, engineers and mechanics came from these countries to install and then ensure proper operation, though they were soon replaced by local mechanics. The initial plans were for a workforce of 1,420 as follows:

	women	girls	men
carding	6		8
sizing	10		34
dyeing			17
bleaching	25		24
spinning	318	116	38
weaving	28	660	74
steam engine ops			22
warehouse			40
Total	387	776	257

The Sants factory was inaugurated on January 1, 1849 and by 1853 it was fully operational with 41,748 spinning bobbins and 1,000 weaving looms, making it the largest in the country. In 1854 it was caught up in the strike called the Conflict of the selfactinas. By 1880, its workforce reached what would become its maximum of some 2,500.

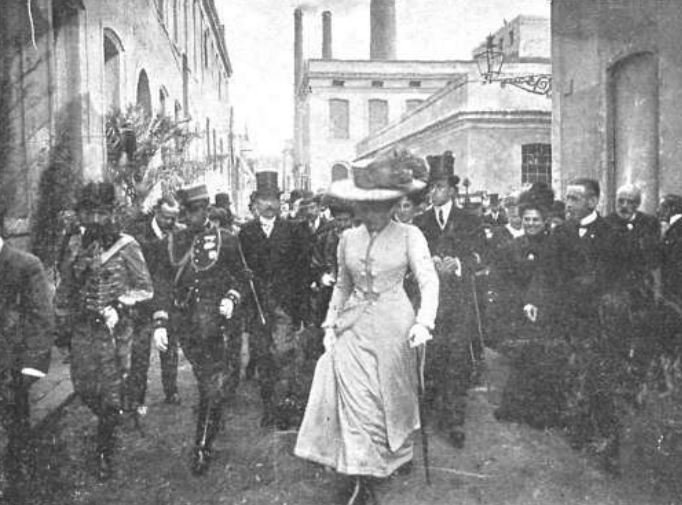
King Alfonso XIII Victòria Eugenia visiting the factory of L'Espanya Industrial in 1908

La España Industrial was always one of the most modern companies dedicated to cotton, with a famous brand of towels and corduroy and even produced its own paper packaging.

The factory, in addition to manufacturing facilities, also provided a nursery, a soup kitchen and sports facilities for its workforce. The owners also provided loans for the workers, and continued to employ old-aged workers in menial tasks, intended to develop a sense of loyalty.

The name Vapor nou (The New Steam Factory) was used in contrast to the name given to the other large textile factory in Sants (owned by Joan Güell), Vapor vell (The Old Steam Factory) which had begun operation in 1846.

The company was collectivised by the workers for two years during the Civil War. In 1969, the facilities in Sants were closed and in 1972 the remaining manufacturing in Sabadell moved to a plant in Mollet del Valles. The company finally closed its doors in 1981.

== CD Condal Football Club ==
In 1934, the sports club of the factory founded a football club, which was to be named CD España Industrial, a subsidiary team of FC Barcelona. In 1956 it became independent from FC Barcelona, changing its name to CD Condal. The club managed to climb to the First division but remained there for only a single year.

== Site rejuvenation ==
In 1985, after many neighborhood demonstrations, the site of the old factory was converted into a housing complex and a large park that adopted the name of the factory, becoming the Parque de la España Industrial, repurposing some of the old buildings including the Casinet d'Hostrafrancs Civic Center, the Pau Nursery, the building called Casa del Mig and the banana forest that form the central body of the current park.

For the 1992 Summer Olympic Games, the España Industrial Sports Centre was built, where the weightlifting events were held.

== Bibliography ==
- "L'Espanya Industrial". Gran Enciclopèdia Catalana (in Catalan). Grup enciclopèdia.
- Gutiérrez Medina, María Luisa (1994). "La España Industrial", 1847-1853. Un modelo de innovación tecnológica ["La España Industrial", 1847-1853. A model of technological innovation] (Thesis) (in Spanish). University of Barcelona. hdl:10803/2003. ISBN 9788469331736.
- Nadal i Oller, Jordi (1973). "The Failure of the Industrial Revolution in Spain, 1830-1914". The Fontana Economic History of Europe. 4 (2). Collins/Fontana: 538–616. ISBN 0006328415.
- Thomson, J.K.J. (2003). "Transferencia tecnológica en la industria algodonera catalana: de la indianas a la selfactina" [Technology transfer in the Catalan cotton industry: from chintz to self-acting mules]. Revista de Historia Industrial (in Spanish). 24.
- Smith, Angel (1991). "Social Conflict and Trade-Union Organisation in the Catalan Cotton Textile Industry, 1890–1914" (PDF). International Review of Social History. 36 (3). doi:10.1017/S0020859000110685.
