= Royal Barcelona Board of Trade =

18th century Catalan educational & regulatory institution

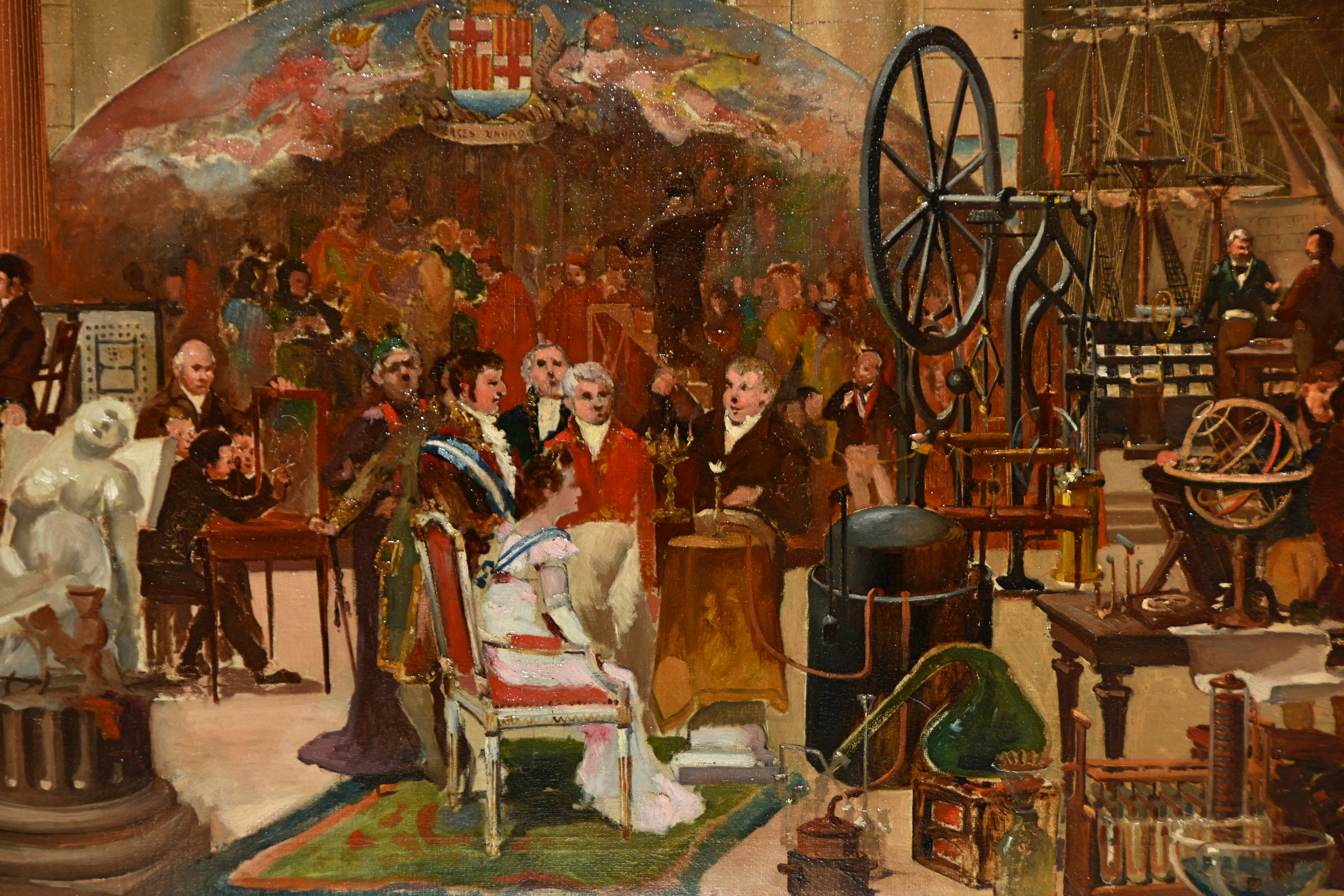
Detail of a painting by Emili Casals y Camps "Visit by King Fernando VII to the Llotja en 1827" (Museum of the History of Barcelona, MUHBA), an allegory of the various schools founded by the Board of Trade

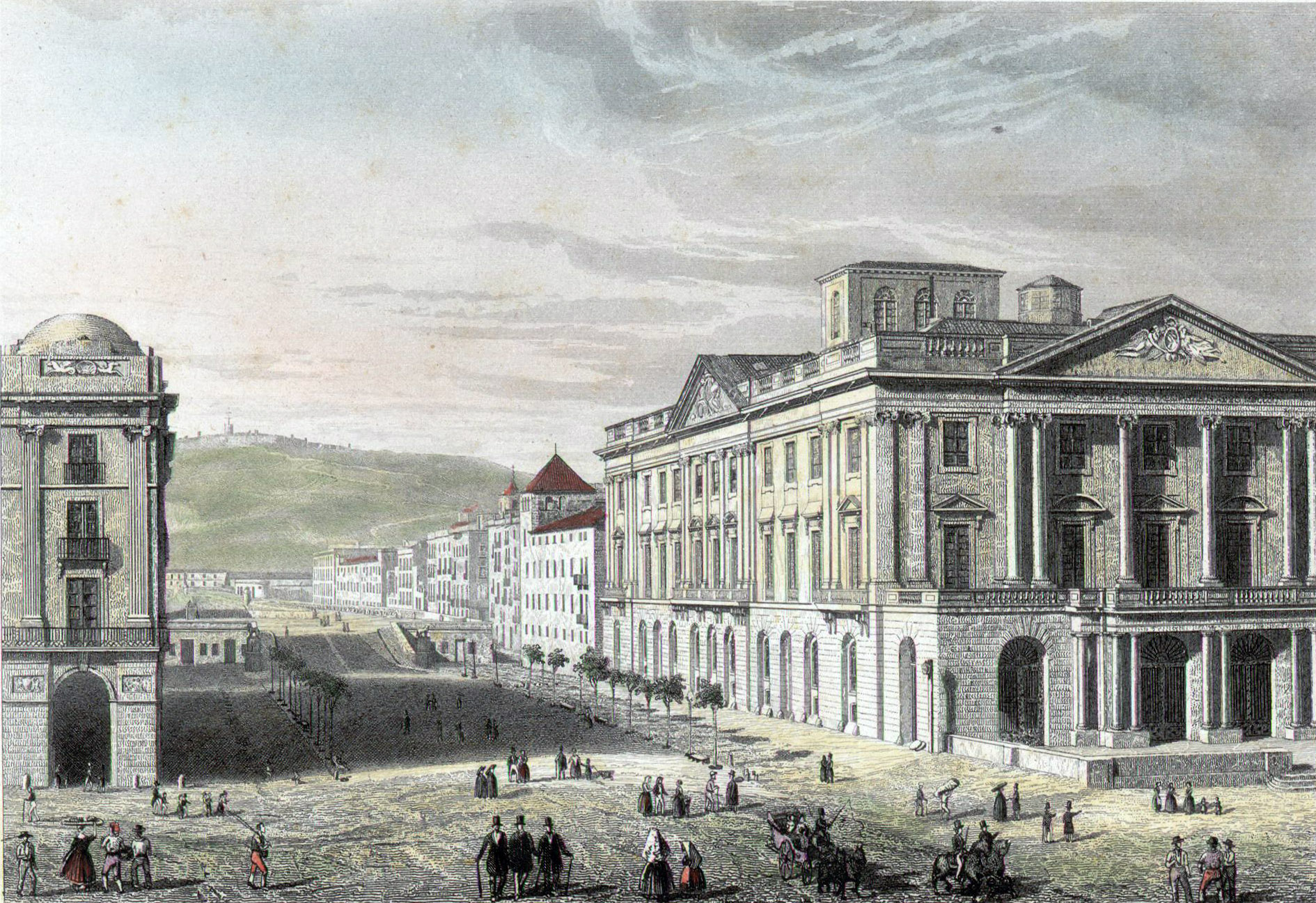
The Llotja de Mar 1842, the seat of the Board of Trade

The Royal Barcelona Board of Trade or Chamber of Commerce (Spanish: Real Junta Particular de Comercio, Catalan: Reial Junta Particular de Comerç de Barcelona) was the leading institution for regulating, representing and promoting Catalan commercial and industrial activity in the 18th and 19th century with jurisdiction over the whole Principality of Catalonia. It was created in Barcelona in 1758 and replaced in 1847 by the Provincial Board of Agriculture, Industry and Commerce.

== History and function ==
After the suppression of the Consulate of the Sea and the universities under the Nueva Planta decrees, local merchants sought a new institution to regulate and support commerce, trade and agriculture and to represent them to royal authorities. It was recognised that traders needed to be trained in accounting, navigators were needed to transport products across the Atlantic, designers were needed to make the products more attractive to consumers, chemists were needed to prepare dyes and other products, technicians were needed to improve agriculture.

The Board of Trade was mainly focused on improving the textile industry including securing trade protection, issuing manufacturing and guild regulations and encouraged research into manufacturing processes. It agitated for the abolition of the bubble tax in 1769 and the opening of Catalonia to American commerce in 1778. Although the Board mostly represented the interests of the big merchants, it also provided a lot of support to artisans and guilds as well as the petite bourgeoisie.

The Board encouraged technical and artistic education, disseminating scientific knowledge coming from abroad, and encouraged innovation in production and trade. It established schools of sailing and navigation (1769), drawing and the fine arts (1775), shorthand (1775), trade (1787), bureau of machines (1804), chemistry (1805), botany and agriculture (1807), mechanics (1808) physics (1814) and economics (1814). Evening classes and free drawing and engraving courses for chintz factory workers was crucial to the growth of that industry and helped to consolidate Barcelona as a city of manufacturing in the mid 18th century.

Outside Barcelona, the board set up a public school of drawing in Mataró, with Joan Barba as a drawing teacher from 1841 to 1851

== Building ==
The former seat of the Consulate of the Sea in Barcelona, the Llotja de Mar (Spanish: Lonja de Mar) which had been used as barracks since 1714, was granted to the Board of Trade in 1767. The Board remodeled the site and built a neoclassical building, between 1774 and 1802. This building enclosed (and preserved) the 14th century trading hall (Catalan: Saló de Contractacions).

== See also ==
- Barcelona Trading Company
- History of the cotton industry in Catalonia

== Bibliography ==
- Barca Salom, Francesc Xavier; et al. (2009). Fàbrica, taller i laboratori. La Junta de Comerç de Barcelona, Ciència i tècnica per a la indústria i el comerç (1769-1851) [Factory, workshop and laboratory. The Board of Trade of Barcelona: science and technology for industry and commerce] (in Spanish). Barcelona: Cambra Oficial de Comerç, Indústria i Navegació de Barcelona. p. 372. ISBN 9788495829665. OCLC 804768915.
- Gurrera i Lluch, Montserrat (2011). "Els Inicis de l'escola pública municipal de dibuix de Mataró i La Implicació de la Junta de Comerç de Barcelona (1815-1886)" [The Beginnings of the municipal school of drawing in Mataró and the involvement of the Board of Trade of Barcelona (1815-1886)]. Sessió d'estudis Mataronins (in Catalan). 27. Mataró: 45–47. ISSN 2385-4766.
- Ruiz y Pablo, Angel (1919). Historia de la Real Junta Particular de Comercio (1758-1847) (in Spanish). Barcelona: Henrich y Cª. p. 447.
- I. Mateo, Pilar, ed. (2014). Universitat a Cervera, La. Commemoració del 1714 a la UB (in Catalan). Universitat de Barcelona. ISBN 978-84-475-3865-2.
- Thomson, J.K.J. (1989). "The Catalan Calico-Printing Industry Compared Internationally". Anuari de la Societat Catalana d'Economia. 7. Societat Catalana d'Economia: 72–95. OCLC 1233047478.
- Pelayo, Javier Antón (2013). "The Enlightenment in Catalonia". Catalan Historical Review. 6 (6). Barcelona: Institut d´Estudis Catalans: 61–71. doi:10.2436/20.1000.01.86. ISSN 2013-407X.
