= Jordi Nadal =

Spanish economist and historian (1929–2020)

- Born: 14 March 1929; Cassà de la Selva, Kingdom of Spain
- Died: 8 December 2020 (aged 91); Barcelona, Spain
- Occupations: Economist; Historian

Jordi Nadal (14 March 1929 – 8 December 2020) was a Spanish economist and historian. He earned a doctorate in history from the University of Barcelona and became a professor at the University of Valencia and Pompeu Fabra University.

== Biography ==
He studied high school at the Institute of Girona and at the Lycée Français in Barcelona. In 1957 he received his doctorate in history at the University of Barcelona after having furthered his studies in Toulouse de Llenguadoc, Paris (1953) and at the University of Pavia (1955). He was a lecturer in Catalan and Spanish at the University of Liverpool (1958-1959) and professor of economic history at the University of Barcelona from 1956 to 1967, professor at the University of Valencia in 1968-1969 and 1970-1980 at the Autonomous University of Barcelona, returning again in 1981 to the University of Barcelona.

In 1972 he founded with Gabriel Tortella Casares the Spanish Association of Economic History (AEHE), of which he was president from 1994 to 1997. He was also the first president of the Association of Historical Demography (ADEH) between 1983 and 1991. He was founder and editor of the Journal of Industrial History since 1992. He was a member of the International Union for the Scientific Study of Population, and is part of the commission in charge of drafting the new demographic dictionary commissioned by the United Nations.

He has contributed to numerous Spanish and foreign history journals, and has specialized in historical studies on population and industrialization in both Catalonia and Spain. In 1997, he was awarded the Creu de Sant Jordi, in 2000 the Col·legi d'Economistes de Catalunya distinguished him as a college of honor and in 2009 he received the AEHE Academic Career Award. In previous years he was linked to the Universitat Pompeu Fabra, where he gave lectures on the economic history of Catalonia. The Universitat Pompeu Fabra named him doctor honoris causa in 2010 and the Universitat de Girona in 2013.

== Publications ==
- El fracaso de la revolución industrial en España (1975)
- Moler, tejer y fundir (1992)
- Atlas de la industrialización de España (1994)

== Distinctions ==
- Premis Narcís Monturiol (1983)
- Creu de Sant Jordi (1997)
- Premio Nacional de Investigación Pascual Madoz (2004)
- Doctor honoris causa of Pompeu Fabra University
