= B Centauri =

The Bayer designations b Centauri and B Centauri are distinct. Due to technical limitations, both designations link here. For the star

- b Centauri, see HD 129116
- B Centauri, see HD 102964

== See also ==
- β Centauri
- b Centauri b
- α Centauri b (disambiguation)
