= Centaure =

Centaure (French, 'Centaur') may refer to:

- French ship Centaure, the name of several ships
  - Centaure-class ship of the line
- Centaure (rocket), a French sounding rocket
- Centaurus (French: Le Centaure), a constellation

== See also ==
- Centaur (disambiguation)
- Centauri (disambiguation)
- Centauro (disambiguation)
- Centaurus (disambiguation)
