= List of shipwrecks in December 1874 =

The list of shipwrecks in December 1874 includes ships sunk, foundered, grounded, or otherwise lost during December 1874.

== 1 December ==
List of shipwrecks: 1 December 1874
Ship	State	Description
Emma	United Kingdom	The schooner ran aground on the West Hoyle Bank, in Liverpool Bay. She was refloated.
Fairlie	United Kingdom	The ship ran aground on the Glass Gorman Bank, in Liverpool Bay. She was on a voyage from Liverpool, Lancashire to Demerara, British Guiana. She was refloated and put back to Liverpool in a leaky condition.
Gresham	United Kingdom	The trow was wrecked in Walton Bay.
Hinrich	Germany	The ship departed from Liverpool for Lagos, Lagos Colony. No further trace, presumed foundered with the loss of all hands.
John Lightfoot	United Kingdom	The ship was wrecked at Cette, Hérault, France with the loss of three of her crew.
Royal Crown	United Kingdom	The steamship was driven ashore at Büyükçekmece, Ottoman Empire. She was refloated with the assistance of four tugs and assisted in to Constantinople, Ottoman Empire.
Symba	United Kingdom	The lugger was driven ashore at "Macammon". Her cre were rescued. She was on a voyage from Strangford, County Down to Belfast, County Antrim.

== 2 December ==
List of shipwrecks: 2 December 1874
Ship	State	Description
A. M. Roberts	United States	The brig was wrecked at "Tonala".
Belmont	United Kingdom	The steamship was driven ashore at "Lule". She was on a voyage from Newcastle upon Tyne, Northumberland to Hamburg, Germany. She was refloated on 4 December and completed her voyage.
City of Oxford	United Kingdom	The steamship ran aground at Birkenhead, Cheshire. She was on a voyage from Birkenhead to Calcutta, India. She was refloated.
Despatch	United Kingdom	The smack was driven ashore and wrecked at Northam, Devon.
Manx Minx	(United Kingdom of Great Britain and Ireland) Isle of Man	The schooner struck a sunken wrecked in the Sound of Sanda. She was on a voyage from the Shetland Islands to Glasgow, Renfrewshire. She put in to Campbeltown, Argyllshire in a leaky condition and was placed under repair.
Marie	Sweden	The schooner foundered off Falster, Denmark. Her crew were rescued. Sue was on a voyage from Uusikaupunki, Grand Duchy of Finland to Copenhagen, Denmark.
Mary	United Kingdom	The ship ran aground on the Salthouse Bank, in the Irish Sea off the coast of Lancashire.
Peter	Russia	The ship was driven ashore and wrecked at Salthouse, Norfolk, United Kingdom. Her crew were rescued.

== 3 December ==
List of shipwrecks: 3 December 1874
Ship	State	Description
Consett	United Kingdom	The ship .
Dextrous	United Kingdom	The schooner was struck by the brig Alfred (United Kingdom) and foundered in the Bristol Channel. Her crew were rescued by Aneroid (United Kingdom).
Emma David	Belgium	The steamship was abandoned in the Mediterranean Sea 180 nautical miles (330 km) off Malta. Her crew were rescued by the steamship Dudley (United Kingdom). Emma David was on a voyage from Kertch, Russia to Antwerp.
George Marchand	Germany	The barque collided with the steamship Consett (United Kingdom) and sank in the Gironde. Her crew were rescued by Consett.
Jane Owen	United Kingdom	The ship was driven ashore near Hastings, Sussex. She was on a voyage from Chatham, Kent to Dublin. She was refloated and put in to Portsmouth, Hampshire in a leaky condition.
Kingfisher	United Kingdom	The barque struck the Goodwin Sands, Kent and was abandoned in a severely leaky condition. Her crew were rescued by the Ramsgate Lifeboat Bradford ( Royal National Lifeboat Institution). Kingfisher was on a voyage from South Shields, County Durham to Havre de Grâce, Seine-Inférieure, France.
Luigi	Flag unknown	The ship ran aground at Berdianski, Russia. She was on a voyage from Antwerp, Belgium to Taganrog, Russia. She was refloated and found to be leaky.
Parodi C.	Italy	The barque ran aground on the Meloria Bank, in the Mediterranean Sea off Livorno. She was on a voyage from Newcastle upon Tyne, Northumberland, United Kingdom to Livorno. She was later refloated with assistance from the steamship Laguna (Italy) and towed in to Livorno.
Rolling Wave	United Kingdom	The ship struck the Minguieps Rocks and was damaged. She was on a voyage from Saint-Malo, Ille-et-Vilaine, France to London. She put back to Saint-Malo in a leaky condition.

== 4 December ==
List of shipwrecks: 4 December 1874
Ship	State	Description
Catherina	Germany	The ship collided with the steamship Germany (Flag unknown) and sank at Hamburg.
Chevington	United Kingdom	The steamship ran aground on the Banjaard Bank, in the North Sea off the Dutch coast. She was on a voyage from Newcastle upon Tyne, Northumberland to Antwerp, Belgium. She was refloated and taken in to Brouwershaven, Zeeland, Netherlands.
Jason	United Kingdom	The ship caught fire in the English Channel off Dungeness, Kent. She was on a voyage from London to Sydney, New South Wales. She put back to London, where she again caught fire on 8 December.
Phoenix	United Kingdom	The Mersey Flat was holed by an anchor and sank at Hoylake, Cheshire. She was refloated on 6 December.
Princess Royal	United Kingdom	The cutter was run into by the steamship Lady Ambrosine (United Kingdom) off the coast of Argyllshire and was severely damaged. Princess Royal was on a voyage from Loch Ewe to Liverpool, Lancashire. She was taken in to Oban.
Zwerver	Germany	The ship was driven ashore at Dragør, Denmark. She was on a voyage from Danzig to London. She was refloated and taken in to Copenhagen, Denmark for reparis.

== 5 December ==
List of shipwrecks: 5 December 1874
Ship	State	Description
Conqueror	United Kingdom	The ship was damaged by fire at Shanghai, China.
Dextrous	United Kingdom	The schooner collided with the brig Alfred (France) and sank off The Mumbles, Glamorgan. Her five crew were rescued by Alfred.
Gustavo	Germany	The schooner was run down and sunk by the barque Jupiter ( (Russian Empire) Grand Duchy of Finland) with the loss of three of her crew. Gustavo was on a voyage from Liepāja, Russia to Antwerp, Belgium.
Planter	United Kingdom	The ship was damaged by fire at the West India Docks, London.

== 6 December ==
List of shipwrecks: 6 December 1874
Ship	State	Description
Annie	United Kingdom	The ship was driven ashore and wrecked on Sanday, Orkney. Her crew were rescued.
Bride	United Kingdom	The steamship was sighted off Gibraltar whilst on a voyage from Alexandria, Egypt to Hull, Yorkshire. No further trace, presumed foundered with the loss of all hands.
Fürst Bismarck	Germany	The ship was driven ashore and wrecked on "Green Island", Cape of Good Hope, Cape Colony. She was on a voyage from Yantai (Chefoo), China to Liverpool, Lancashire.
Gruno	Netherlands	The brigantine was abandoned in the North Sea (56°27′N 6°32′E). Her crew were rescued by the steamship Rollo (United Kingdom). Gruno was on a voyage from Pärnu, Russia to Schiedam, South Holland.
Helene	United Kingdom	The brig was abandoned in the North Sea. She was on a voyage from Hartlepool, County Durham to Langesund, Norway.
Highland Maid	United Kingdom	The schooner was driven ashore and wrecked at Stradbally, County Waterford with loss of life. She was on a voyage from Verdun, Meuse, France to Hamburg, Germany.
Jasper	United Kingdom	The schooner was driven ashore at "Timara". She was on a voyage from Cette, Hérault, France to Glasgow, Renfrewshire. She was refloated and taken in to Gibraltar.
Nuova Abele	Italy	The ship was driven ashore and wrecked at East London, Cape Colony. Her crew were rescued. She was on a voyage from "Passoerang" to London, United Kingdom.
Osprey	United Kingdom	The ship was driven ashore at Dungeness, Kent. She was on a voyage from Halifax, Nova Scotia, Canada to Woolwich, Kent. She was refloated and taken in to Dover, Kent in a severely leaky condition and was beached there Subsequently refloated and completed her voyage.

== 7 December ==
List of shipwrecks: 7 December 1874
Ship	State	Description
Avon	United Kingdom	The ship ran aground in the River Thames at Blackwall, Middlesex. She was on a voyage from Tuticorin, India to London. She was refloated.
Charlotte	United Kingdom	The smack was driven ashore and wrecked in Widemouth Bay. Her crew were rescued by the Coastguard. She was on a voyage from "Ballinamara" to the Mumbles, Glamorgan.
Citizen	United Kingdom	The steamship struck the pier and sank at Dunkirk, Nord, France. She was on a voyage from London to Dunkirk. Citizen was refloated on 15 December and beached.
Cyprian Queen	United Kingdom	The brig departed from Burntisland, Fife for Dover, Kent. Subsequently foundered with the loss of all seven crew. Wreckage washed up on at Whitby, Yorkshire.
Eleanor	United Kingdom	The Mersey Flat was run into by the steamship Polynesian (United Kingdom) and was severely damaged at Birkenhead, Cheshire.
Fairy Queen	United Kingdom	The schooner departed from Drogheda, County Louth for Preston, Lancashire. No further trace, presumed foundered with the loss of all hands.
Holland	United Kingdom	The steamship struck the quayside at Havre de Grâce, Seine-Inférieure, France. She was on a voyage from London to New York, United States.
Island Belle	United Kingdom	The schooner was towed in to the Nieuwe Diep in a sinking condition. She was on a voyage from Java, Netherlands East Indies to Amsterdam, North Holland, Netherlands. She was refloated on 24 December and towed in to Amsterdam.
Martha	United Kingdom	The ship was abandoned in the Dogger Bank. Her crew were rescued by the smack Gloriana (United Kingdom). Martha was on a voyage from Odesa, Russia to Caernarfon.
Orconera	Germany	The steamship ran aground in the Bokkegat. She was on a voyage from Rotterdam, South Holland, Netherlands to Königsberg. She was refloated and taken in to Brouwershaven, Zeeland, Netherlands.
Spartan	United Kingdom	The steamship was driven ashore at Cape Helles, Ottoman Empire. She was refloated on 10 December and towed in to the Dardanelles in a leaky condition. She was subsequently towed to Constantinople, Ottoman Empire for repairs.
Tiara	United Kingdom	The brigantine departed from Santander, Spain for Newport, Monmouthshire. Presumed subsequently foundered with the loss of all seven crew. A boat from the ship was discovered by Maria Stella (France).

== 8 December ==
List of shipwrecks: 8 December 1874
Ship	State	Description
Albert	United Kingdom	The brig was driven ashore at Granton, Lothian. Her crew were rescued. She was on a voyage from Aberdeen to Pwllheli, Caernarfonshire.
Alice	United Kingdom	The steamship was sighted off Lundy Island, Devon whilst on a voyage from Cardiff, Glamorgan to Constantinople, Ottoman Empire. No further trace, presumed foundered with the loss of all nineteen crew. She may have been sighted off Ouessant, Finistère, France on 11 December.
Anne	United Kingdom	The ship was lost at Fishguard, Pembrokeshire. It was found that two holes had been bored in her hull and that she was insured for more than she was worth. Her captain had his certificate suspended for two years.
Caledonia	United Kingdom	The brig was driven ashore as Saltburn, Yorkshire. Her six crew were rescued by rocket apparatus. She was on a voyage from Rochester, Kent to South Shields, County Durham.
Diana	Austria-Hungary	The barque was driven ashore between Gunwalloe and Mullion, Cornwall, United Kingdom. All on board were rescued by the Coastguard using rocket apparatus. She was on a voyage from Taganrog, Russia to Falmouth, Cornwall and Dublin, United Kingdom.
Elert	United Kingdom	The schooner was driven ashore on Cramond Island, in the Firth of Forth.
Elm	United Kingdom	The Mersey Flat sank at Liverpool, Lancashire. Both crew were rescued by the tug Gladiator (United Kingdom).
Jason	United Kingdom	The ship caught fire at London and was severely damaged.
Niord	Norway	The ship was driven ashore and wrecked at Lemvig, Denmark.
Queen	United Kingdom	The steamship was driven ashore at Granton. All on board were rescued. She was on a voyage from Aberdeen to Granton. She was refloated and beached.
Scorpio	United Kingdom	The steamship foundered off the north Devon coast with the loss of all 26 crew. She was on a voyage from Cardiff to the Charente.
Vinteren	Germany	The derelict barque was towed in to Fredrikshavn in a waterlogged condition.
Zenith	United Kingdom	The fishing boat departed from South Shields. No further trace, presumed foundered with the loss of all five crew.

== 9 December ==
List of shipwrecks: 9 December 1874
Ship	State	Description
Alfred Charles	United Kingdom	The schooner was driven ashore near Egmond aan Zee, North Holland, Netherlands. Her crew were rescued. She was on a voyage from Plymouth, Devon to Harburg, Germany.
Alabama	United Kingdom	The schooner was driven ashore at Donna Nook, Lincolnshire. Her four crew were rescued.
Alice	Norway	The barque was driven ashore at Clee Ness, Lincolnshire. She was on a voyage from Vyborg, Grand Duchy of Finland to Grimsby, Lincolnshire.
Amity	United Kingdom	The ship was driven ashore at West Appledore, Devon.
Anna and Marie	United Kingdom	The sloop was driven ashore and damaged at Anderby, Lincolnshire. She was on a voyage from London to Goole, Yorkshire.
Beeswing	United Kingdom	The schooner was driven ashore and wrecked at West Hartlepool, County Durham. Her six crew were rescued.
Blakeney and Hull Packet	United Kingdom	The Yorkshire Billyboy was wrecked a Collier Hope, Yorkshire with the loss of all hands, five or six lives.
Blythe	United Kingdom	The schooner was wrecked in Collier Hope. Her crew were rescued.
Branch	United Kingdom	The ship was driven ashore and wrecked at Hartlepool. Her seven crew survived.
Bride	United Kingdom	The sloop was driven ashore and wrecked at Whitby, Yorkshire with the loss of her captain. Two survivors were rescued by the Whitby Lifeboat.
Britannia	United Kingdom	The brig was driven ashore and wrecked at Whitby. Her eight crew were rescued. She was on a voyage from Newhaven, Sussex to South Shields, County Durham.
British Queen	United Kingdom	The schooner was driven ashore at Donna Nook with the loss of all five crew.
Brothers	United Kingdom	The brigantine was driven ashore and wrecked on Rathlin Island, County Antrim. Her crew were rescued. She was on a voyage from Llanelly, Glamorgan to Sligo.
Carolina	Netherlands	The schooner was driven and wrecked at Looe, Cornwall, United Kingdom. Her crew were rescued by the Looe Lifeboat Oxfordshire ( Royal National Lifeboat Institution).
Castle	United Kingdom	The brig was driven ashore at Filey, Yorkshire. Her crew were rescued. She was on a voyage from London to South Shields, or vice versa.
Centaur	Victoria	The brig struck the southern section of Marmion Reef north of Perth, Western Australia, and sank. All 13 people on board, including noted politician and lawyer Septimus Burt, survived.
Chance	United Kingdom	The brig foundered off West Hartlepool with the loss of all hands.
Chance	United Kingdom	The ship was driven ashore at Hartlepool. Her crew were rescued.
Charles	France	The barque was discovered in a waterlogged condition in the Atlantic Ocean by America (Germany), which was unable to take her crew off.
Clara Richmond	United Kingdom	The brig was driven ashore and severely damaged at West Hartlepool. Her crew were rescued.
Clare	United Kingdom	The sloop sank at Ferriby Sluice, Lincolnshire. She was on a voyage from Hull, Yorkshire to Gainsborough, Lincolnshire.
Conqueror	United Kingdom	The brig was driven ashore and wrecked at Seaham, County Durham. Her seven crew were rescued by rocket apparatus. She was on a voyage from Ramsgate, Kent to Sunderland, County Durham.
Corsair	United Kingdom	The ship was driven ashore and severely damaged at West Hartlepool. Her crew were rescued.
Corrymbus	United Kingdom	The schooner was driven ashore at Coatham, Yorkshire, having been driven through Coatham Pier. Her five crew were rescued. She was on a voyage from Boulogne, Pas-de-Calais, France to South Shields.
Cossack	United Kingdom	The ship was driven ashore and severely damaged at West Hartlepool. Her crew were rescued.
Dabit	France	The schooner was driven ashore and severely damaged at Whitby. She was on a voyage from Gravelines, Nord to West Hartlepool.
Danube	United Kingdom	The brig was driven ashore at Whitby. Her crew were rescued. She was refloated on 26 January 1875 and taken in to Whitby for repairs.
Dea	United Kingdom	The schooner was driven ashore at Donna Nook. Her six crew were rescued.
Emily Constance	United Kingdom	The schooner was driven ashore at Ramsey, Isle of Man with the loss of a crew member.
Excelsior	United Kingdom	The schooner was driven ashore and wrecked at Whitby. Her six crew were rescued. She was on a voyage from Whitstable, Kent to Sunderland.
Express	United Kingdom	The brigantine was driven ashore at Redcar, Yorkshire. Her crew were rescued. She was on a voyage from Boulogne to Blyth, Northumberland.
Fortuna	Norway	The barque sank at Lowestoft, Suffolk, United Kingdom.
Fry	United Kingdom	The schooner was driven ashore at Whitby with the loss of her captain.
Garibaldi	United Kingdom	The brig was driven ashore at Coatham. Her seven crew were rescued by rocket apparatus.
Gray	United Kingdom	The sloop sank at Ferriby Sluice. She was on a voyage from Hull to Gainsborough.
Griffin	United Kingdom	The brig was driven ashore at Coatham, having been driven through Coatham Pier. Her seven crew were rescued. She was on a voyage from Whitby to Sunderland.
Grinkle	United Kingdom	The steamship was driven ashore at Saltburn, Yorkshire. Her ten crew were rescued by the Saltburn Lifeboat Appleyard ( Royal National Lifeboat Institution). Grinkle was on a voyage from the River Tyne to La Rochelle, Charente-Inférieure, France. She was refloated on 24 December and taken in to the River Tyne.
Guernsey	(United Kingdom of Great Britain and Ireland) Guernsey	The ship departed from Jersey, Channel Islands for a French port. Presumed foundered with the loss of all hands, wreckage washed up on Jersey.
Haitienne	France	The barque was driven ashore at Selsey Bill, Sussex with the loss of a crew member. She was on a voyage from Havre de Grâce, Seine-Inférieure to Cap-Haïtien, Haiti.
Hebe	United Kingdom	The schooner was driven ashore and wrecked at West Hartlepool Her five crew were rescued.
Hematite	United Kingdom	The schooner was driven ashore and severely damaged at Glenariff, County Antrim.
Henry Cooke	United Kingdom	The barque was driven ashore and wrecked at South Shields with the loss of all sixteen crew. She was on a voyage from Quebec City, Canada to Sunderland.
Herald	United Kingdom	The schooner was driven ashore on Saltholm, Denmark. She was on a voyage from Liepāja, Russia to London. She was refloated and taken in to Copenhagen, Denmark.
Hey Dick	United Kingdom	The ship was driven ashore and wrecked at Cley-next-the-Sea, Norfolk. Her crew were rescued. She was on a voyage from Goole to London, or London to Boston, Lincolnshire.
Indian Chief, or Indian Queen	United Kingdom	The ship was driven ashore at Whitby with the loss of a crew member. She was on a voyage from Beaulieu, Hampshire to Sunderland.
Isabella	United Kingdom	The brigantine was driven ashore and wrecked at Whitby.
Isabella Miller	United Kingdom	The ship was driven ashore and severely damaged at West Hartlepool. Her crew were rescued.
Jalawar	United Kingdom	The ship was driven ashore at Dunkirk, Nord. She was on a voyage from Calcutta, India to Dunkirk.
Jane	United Kingdom	The schooner was driven ashore at Donna Nook. Her six crew were rescued.
J. G. Frecker	United Kingdom	The schooner was driven ashore at South Shields. Her crew survived. She was on a voyage from London to Buckhaven, Fife.
John George	United Kingdom	The barque was driven ashore and wrecked at Bamburgh Castle, Northumberland. Her eleven crew were rescued by the North Sunderland Lifeboat. She was on a voyage from Kronstadt, Russia to Leith, Lothian and/or Antwerp, Belgium.
John Sharpe	United Kingdom	The brig ran aground on the Brake Sand. She was on a voyage from Sunderland to Shoreham-by-Sea, Sussex. She was refloated and assisted in to Ramsgate in a leaky condition.
Joseph Straker	United Kingdom	The steamship was driven ashore in gale at West Hartlepool. She subsequently broke up.
J. P. Trigger	United Kingdom	The schooner ran aground on the Herd Sand, in the North Sea off the coast of County Durham. Her crew were rescued.
Kate	United Kingdom	The ship was driven ashore and wrecked at Whitby with the loss of her captain. Two survivors were rescued by the Whitby Lifeboat Harriet Forteath ( Royal National Lifeboat Institution).
Kathleen	United Kingdom	The Yorkshire Billyboy was driven ashore at Donna Nook. Her three crew were rescued by the Donna Nook Lifeboat.
Katie	United Kingdom	The brigantine collided with the steamship American (United Kingdom) and sank in the Atlantic Ocean 200 nautical miles (370 km) off the coast of the Newfoundland Colony. Her crew were rescued by American. Katie was on a voyage from Dublin to the Newfoundland Colony.
Kingfisher	United Kingdom	The barque was abandoned off Caister-on-Sea, Norfolk. Her ten crew were rescued by the Caister Lifeboat The Boys ( Royal National Lifeboat Institution). Kingfisher was on a voyage from London to South Shields. She was taken in to Great Yarmouth, Norfolk in a waterlogged condition with the assistance of a tug.
Laurae	Norway	The barque ran aground at "Samphires", County Kerry, United Kingdom.
La Belle	United Kingdom	The lighter sank at Greenock, Renfrewshire. Her three crew survived.
Laurel	United Kingdom	The ship was driven ashore at Donna Nook. Her six crew were rescued.
Lord Summers	United Kingdom	The brig was driven ashore at Whitby. Her six crew were rescued by the Coastguard using rocket apparatus. She was on a voyage from London to South Shields.
L'Orient	United Kingdom	The Humber Keel was driven ashore and sank at Winteringham, Lincolnshire. Her crew survived.
Maiden Queen	United Kingdom	The schooner was driven ashore at Whitby. Her crew were rescued.
Marie Felix	France	The schooner was wrecked on the Brake Sand. Her crew were reported missing, presumed lost.
Mary Ann	United Kingdom	The trawling dandy was driven ashore and wrecked at Scarborough, Yorkshire with the loss of two of her five crew. Survivors were rescued by the Coastguard.
Mary Ann	United Kingdom	The ship was wrecked at Southampton, Hampshire with the loss of two of her crew.
Massereene	United Kingdom	The schooner was driven ashore and wrecked at Port Lewaigue, in Ramsey Bay, Isle of Man. Her crew were rescued. She was on a voyage from Maryport, Cumberland to Dublin.
Newark Castle	United Kingdom	The Humber Keel was driven ashore and sank at Winteringham with the loss of one life. She was on a voyage from Hull to Newark, Nottinghamshire.
Ocean	United Kingdom	The Humber Keel was driven ashore and sank at Winteringham. She was on a voyage from Hull to North Muskham, Nottinghamshire.
Patchett	United Kingdom	The ship foundered off the coast of Yorkshire with the loss of all hands.
Peace	United Kingdom	The Yorkshire Billyboy was driven ashore at Huttoft, Lincolnshire. Her crew were rescued. She was on a voyage from London to Goole.
Pioneer	United Kingdom	The schooner was driven ashore at Donna Nook. Her four crew were rescued.
Pride	United Kingdom	The ketch was driven ashore at Whitby with the loss of her captain. Her crew were rescued by the Whitby Lifeboat Robert Whitworth or Harriet Forteath ( Royal National Lifeboat Institution). Pride was on a voyage from London to Dundee, Forfarshire. Eight salvors had to be rescued from the ship by the Whitby Lifeboat on 16 December. Pride was refloated on 19 December and taken in to Whitby.
Providence	United Kingdom	The barque was driven ashore and severely damaged at West Hartlepool. Her crew were rescued by the Hartlepool Lifeboat.
Queen of the Isles	United Kingdom	The barquentine was driven ashore and wrecked at Seaham. Her nine crew were rescued by rocket apparatus. She was on a voyage from Boulogne, Pas-de-Calais, France to South Shields.
Queen Victoria	United Kingdom	The schooner was driven ashore and wrecked at Whitby with the loss of a crew member. Five or six survivors were rescued by rocket apparatus.
Robert and Mary	United Kingdom	The brig was driven ashore and severely damaged at West Hartlepool. Her crew were rescued by a lifeboat.
Robert and William	United Kingdom	The brigantine was driven ashore at Redcar. Her crew were rescued. She was on a voyage from Aldeburgh, Suffolk to Sunderland.
Rosamund	United Kingdom	The barque was driven ashore and capsized at Whitby.
Rose	United Kingdom	The ship was driven ashore and severely damaged at West Hartlepool. Her crew were rescued by the Hartlepool Lifeboat.
Rose	United Kingdom	The steamship ran aground in the River Foyle. She was on a voyage from Londonderry to Glasgow, Renfrewshire.
Sarah	United Kingdom	The Humber Keel was driven ashore and sank at Winteringham. She was on a voyage from Hull to Gunthorpe, Nottinghamshire.
Sibal	Norway	The brig was driven ashore and wrecked at Point Lynas, Anglesey, United Kingdom with the loss of her pilot. Her nine crew were rescued by the keepers of the Point Lynas Lighthouse. She was on a voyage from Wilmington, Delaware, United States to Liverpool, Lancashire, United Kingdom.
Spy	United Kingdom	The schooner was driven ashore and wrecked at Ramsey. Her crew were rescued. She was on a voyage from Killough, County Louth to Douglas, Isle of Man.
Syria	Norway	The barque was driven ashore at Noordwijk, South Holland, Netherlands with the loss of three of her crew. She was on a voyage from Skellefteå, Sweden to Antwerp.
Thomas	United Kingdom	The brig was wrecked between the Isles of Scilly and the Smalls Lighthouse. Her eight crew were rescued by the steamship Luxor (United Kingdom). Thomas was on a voyage from Huelva, Spain to Silloth, Cumberland.
Thornaby	United Kingdom	The steamship departed from Cardiff, Glamorgan for Bombay, India. No further trace, presumed foundered with the loss of all 28 crew.
Triumph	United Kingdom	The ship sank at Lowestoft.
Tuscan	United Kingdom	The brigantine was driven ashore and wrecked at Filey with the loss of a crew member.
Vulcan	United Kingdom	The sloop was wrecked at Hull.
Welsh	United Kingdom	The sloop sank at Ferriby Sluice. She was on a voyage from Hull to Gainsborough.
William Leavitt	United Kingdom	The ship ran aground on the Pluckington Bank, in Liverpool Bay. She was on a voyage from Rangoon, Burma to Liverpool.
North Sunderland Lifeboat	Royal National Lifeboat Institution	The lifeboat was severely damaged rescuing the crew of John George (United Kingdom).
Redcar Lifeboat	Royal National Lifeboat Institution	The lifeboat was holed on being launched.
Unnamed	United Kingdom	The schooner was driven ashore north of Collier Hope.
Unnamed	United Kingdom	The schooner was driven ashore north of Sandsend, Yorkshire.
Two unnamed vessels	France	The ships were driven ashore and wrecked 3 nautical miles (5.6 km) north of Whitby. A crew member from one of the ships was lost.
Unnamed	United Kingdom	The Yorkshire Billyboy was driven ashore at Whitby in a capsized condition with the loss of all hands.
Two unnamed vessels	United Kingdom	The trows were driven ashore at Portishead, Somerset.
Unnamed	United Kingdom	The fishing smack was wrecked at Winterton-on-Sea, Norfolk with the loss of all five crew.

== 10 December ==
List of shipwrecks: 10 December 1874
Ship	State	Description
Breeze	United Kingdom	The steamship ran aground on the Black Middens, in the North Sea off the coast of County Durham All 30 people on board were rescued by the South Shields Lifeboat Constance, the North Shields Lifeboat Northumberland (both Royal National Lifeboat Institution) or by rocket apparatus. She was on a voyage from Hartlepool, County Durham to the River Tyne.
Constance	Royal National Lifeboat Institution	The lifeboat was severely damaged at South Shields by a large baulk of timber.
Domingo	Italy	The ship was driven ashore at Wells-next-the-Sea, Norfolk, United Kingdom. Her crew were rescued. She was on a voyage from London to South Shields, County Durham.
Earl Gower	United Kingdom	The schooner was driven ashore at Bettystown, County Meath. Her crew were rescued. She was on a voyage from Ardrossan, Ayrshire to Balbriggan, County Dublin.
Eleanor	United Kingdom	The brig caught fire at Bagvig, Sweden and was scuttled.
Falcon	United Kingdom	The ship foundered near Newport, Monmouthshire. She was on a voyage from Bristol, Gloucestershire to Newcastle upon Tyne, Northumberland.
Hero	United Kingdom	The steamship ran aground in the Humber. She was refloated and taken in to Hull, Yorkshire.
Island Belle	United Kingdom	The ship was driven ashore on Schouwen, Zeeland, Netherlands.
Kingsdown	United Kingdom	The barque collided with the brig Loyal Standard (United Kingdom and was abandoned off Great Yarmouth, Norfolk. Her crew were rescued by the Caister Lifeboat. She was on a voyage from London to South Shields. She was assisted in to Great Yarmouth by a tug.
Norman	Germany	The ship was wrecked at Le Crotoy, Somme, France. Her crew were rescued. She was on a voyage from Malmö, Sweden to Brazil.
Princess Helena	United Kingdom	The schooner was driven ashore and wrecked at Ayr. Her five crew were rescued by the Ayr Lifeboat. She was on a voyage from Fowey, Cornwall to Glasgow, Renfrewshire.
Radama	United Kingdom	The ship was driven ashore in the Gaspar Strait. She was on a voyage from Hong Kong to Callao, Peru. She was refloated and taken in to Singapore, Straits Settlements in a leaky condition.
Rescourie, or Resource	United Kingdom	The barque was abandoned in the Atlantic Ocean. Her crew were rescued by Suzanne (France). The barque was on a voyage from Baltimore, Maryland to London.
Satellite	United Kingdom	The tender collided with the Mersey Ferry Cheshire (United Kingdom) at Liverpool, Lancashire and was severely damaged.
Shamrock	United Kingdom	The steamship collided with a Russian barque and sank in the Humber. The wreck was dispersed by explosives in September 1875.
Shelbourne	Germany	The barque was abandoned in the Atlantic Ocean. Her crew were rescued by the steamship RMS Africa (United Kingdom). Shelbourne was on a voyage from Jamaica to Queenstown, County Cork, United Kingdom. Shelbourne was discovered on 15 December by the steamship West Stanley (United Kingdom), which put four hands aboard and took her in tow. The tow rope subsequently broke; the four crew on board were to try to take her in to Falmouth, Cornwall.
Soeblomsten	Netherlands	The barque was driven ashore near Egmond aan Zee, North Holland and was abandoned by her crew.
Southern Empire	United Kingdom	The ship was abandoned in the Atlantic Ocean with the loss of eleven of her of her 25 crew. Survivors were rescued by the steamship Toscoff (Russia).
Thomas and Rebecca	United Kingdom	The barque was wrecked at Jaffa, Ottoman Syria.
Walter Scott	United Kingdom	The brig was driven ashore and wrecked at Flekkefjord, Norway.
Walker	United Kingdom	The schooner was driven ashore at Lindisfarne, Northumberland in a capsized condition with the loss of all four crew. She was on a voyage from Peterhead, Aberdeenshire to Newcastle upon Tyne.
Warkworth	United Kingdom	The steamship was driven onto the pier at Boulogne, Pas-de-Calais, France. She was on a voyage from South Shields, County Durham to Boulogne.
Unnamed	Flag unknown	The schooner ran aground on the West Hoyle Bank, in Liverpool Bay.

== 11 December ==
List of shipwrecks: 11 December 1874
Ship	State	Description
Arcadia	United Kingdom	The brigantine was wrecked at South Shields, County Durham with the loss of two of her six crew. Survivors were rescued by breeches buoy. She was on a voyage from Runcorn, Cheshire to Newcastle upon Tyne, Northumberland.
Argo	United Kingdom	The ketch was driven ashore and wrecked at Lowestoft, Suffolk. Her four crew were rescued by rocket apparats. She was on a voyage from Maldon, Essex to Newcastle upon Tyne, Northumberland.
Brighton	United Kingdom	The steamship was driven ashore at Cowden, Yorkshire. She was on a voyage from the River Tyne to London.
Cantry	United Kingdom	The schooner was driven ashore at Seacliff, Lothian.
Carl	Russia	The schooner was driven ashore at Newton, Northumberland. Her crew were rescued. Her crew were rescued.
Ceylon	United Kingdom	The full-rigged ship was driven ashore and wrecked in the Bay of Authie with the loss of three of her seventeen crew. She was on a voyage from Iquique, Peru to London.
Cito	Germany	The brig was wrecked near Camaret-sur-Mer, Finistère, France. She was on a voyage from Hamburg to Savannah, Georgia, United States.
Delight	United Kingdom	The schooner was driven ashore and wrecked between East Blatchington and Seaford, Sussex. Her five crew were rescued by the Seaford Lifeboat Elizabeth Boys ( Royal National Lifeboat Institution). Delight was on a voyage from Seaham, County Durham to Southampton, Hampshire.
Heinrich Bjorn	Flag unknown	The barque was driven ashore at Warrenpoint, County Antrim, United Kingdom.
Hibernia	United Kingdom	The Thames barge collided with Marco Polo (United Kingdom) and sank in the River Thames at Blackwall, Middlesex.
James	United Kingdom	The ship was driven ashore and wrecked at Ballyquinton, County Down. Her crew were rescued. She was on a voyage from Drogheda, County Louth to Swansea, Glamorgan.
Johannes Duyyens Tonsect	Norway	The barque was driven ashore east of Ambleteuse, Pas-de-Calais, France. Her nine crew were rescued. She was on a voyage from Newhaven, Sussex to Christiania.
John George	United Kingdom	The barque was driven ashore near Bamburgh Castle, Northumberland with the loss of one of the twelve people on board. Survivors were rescued by the North Sunderland Lifeboat.
Joseph	France	The cutter was wrecked off La Collette Point, Jersey, Channel Islands with the loss of three lives.
Lady Basset	United Kingdom	The schooner was driven ashore and wrecked at Lowestoft. Her five crew were rescued by beachmen and the Lowestoft Lifeboat George ( Royal National Lifeboat Institution). Lady Bassett was on a voyage from Runcorn, Cheshire to Newcastle upon Tyne.
Louise of Lorne	United Kingdom	The steamship was driven ashore between Tunstall and Withernsea, Yorkshire.
Marco Polo	United Kingdom	The ship ran aground at Blackwall. She was on a voyage from Quebec City, Canada to London.
Mario Boggiano	Italy	The barque was wrecked at Harwich, Essex, United Kingdom with the loss of two lives.
Mary A. Way	Netherlands	The barque was driven ashore at Dunegness, Kent, United Kingdom. She was on a voyage from Rotterdam, South Holland to the Bonny River, Africa. She was refloated and taken in tow for Dover, Kent but capsized off Dover. Her crew were rescued by three lifeboats but a lifeboatman was lost. She broke up on 16 December.
Orion	Norway	The steamship was driven ashore at Bodø. She was on a voyage from a port in Nordland to Bergen.
Radiant	United Kingdom	The schooner was driven ashore at Great Yarmouth, Norfolk. She was on a voyage from Ipswich, Suffolk to Burghead, Moray.
Richard Brown	United Kingdom	The brigantine was driven ashore and severely damaged in the Bay of Luce. Her crew were rescued. She was on a voyage from Whitehaven, Cumberland to Portrush, County Antrim.
Rimac	United Kingdom	The brig was driven ashore at Saltfleet, Lincolnshire. She was on a voyage from Kronstadt, Russia to Hull, Yorkshire.
Tyne	United Kingdom	The steamship was driven ashore and wrecked in Robin Hoods Bay. Her seventeen crew were rescued. She was on a voyage from London to South Shields.
Venus	(United Kingdom of Great Britain and Ireland) Isle of Man	The smack foundered in the Irish Sea. Her crew were rescued by a steamship Penguin (United Kingdom). Venus was on a voyage from Maryport, Cumberland to Douglas.
Woods	United Kingdom	The brigantine sank at Greenore, County Wexford. She was on a voyage from Newry, County Antrim to Drogheda, County Louth.
Unnamed	United Kingdom	The schooner was driven ashore at Bettystown, County Meath. Her crew were rescued.
Unnamed	United Kingdom	The smack sank in the River Thames at Woolwich, Kent with the loss of all on board.
Unnamed	United Kingdom	The Humber Keel was run down and sunk by a steamship at South Shields with the loss of a crew member.

== 12 December ==
List of shipwrecks: 12 December 1874
Ship	State	Description
Accra	(United Kingdom of Great Britain and Ireland) Guernsey	The brigantine foundered in the Atlantic Ocean 45 nautical miles (83 km) west of Ouessant, Finistère. Her six crew were rescued by the steamship Pickwick (United Kingdom). Accra was on a voyage from Sierra Leone to Liverpool, Lancashire.
Avena	United Kingdom	The barque was abandoned in the Atlantic Ocean (50°10′N 17°00′W). Her ten crew were rescued by Indiana (United Kingdom). Avena was on a voyage from Saint John, New Brunswick, Canada to Sligo. She was towed in to Waterford on 30 January 1875 by the steamship South of Ireland.
Briarley	United Kingdom	The barque foundered at sea. All nineteen people on board were rescued by the steamship Silesia (Germany). Briarley was on a voyage from Demerara, British Guiana to Liverpool, Lancashire.
Corsair	United Kingdom	The ship was driven ashore and wrecked at Seatown, Dorset.
Deux Celine, and Raphael	France; Italy	The schooner Deux Celine collided with the brig Raphael and sank off Penarth, Glamorgan, United Kingdom. Raphael was severely damaged.
Emily	United Kingdom	The ship ran aground in the Seine and was damaged. She was on a voyage from Newcastle upon Tyne, Northumberland to Rouen, Seine-Inférieure, France.
Fifeshire	United Kingdom	The steamship was driven ashore at Dunbar, Lothian. She was on a voyage from London to Kirkcaldy, Fife. She was refloated and completed her voyage for repairs.
J. M. Strachan	United Kingdom	The steamship was holed by the propeller of the steamship Jubilee (United Kingdom) and sank in the River Thames at Charlton, Kent. She was refloated on 18 December.
La Pace	Italy	The barque was wrecked at Santander, Spain with some loss of life. She was on a voyage from Santander to Savona.
Lawsons	United Kingdom	The brig was wrecked at Hollesley, Suffolk. Her eight crew were rescued by breeches buoy. She was on a voyage from London to South Shields, County Durham.
Maria Borzone	Italy	The barque was driven ashore in Hollesley Bay with the loss of her pilot. Her eleven crew were rescued, as were the ship's cat and dog. She was on a voyage from Marianople, Russia to Stockton-on-Tees, County Durham.
Pace	Italy<	The barque was wrecked at Santander, Spain with the loss of seven of her eleven crew. Survivors were rescued by SMS Albatross, SMS Nautilus (both Imperial German Navy) and Ville de Brest (France).
Sophie Emshagen	(Russian Empire) Grand Duchy of Finland	The ship was driven ashore on Skagen, Denmark. She was on a voyage from Leith, Lothian to Helsinki. She was refloated and taken in to Fredrikshavn, Denmark.
Swan	Russia	The ship was wrecked at Santander with the loss of a crew member. Survivors were rescued by SMS Albatross, SMS Nautilus (both Imperial German Navy) and Ville de Brest (France).
Unnamed	Flag unknown	The smack capsized sank in the River Thames at Woolwich, Kent, United Kingdom with the loss of both crew. She was raised on 14 December.

== 13 December ==
List of shipwrecks: 13 December 1874
Ship	State	Description
Alpha	United Kingdom	The steamship foundered in the Bay of Biscay. Her 24 crew were rescued by the full-rigged ship County of Sutherland (United Kingdom). Alpha was on a voyage from Alexandria, Egypt to Hull, Yorkshire.
Atlantic	United Kingdom	The ship was abandoned in the Atlantic Ocean. Her crew were rescued by a French vessel. She was on a voyage from Belize City, British Honduras to London.
Beautiful Star	United Kingdom	The smack was run down and sunk in the Humber by the steamship Annie (United Kingdom). Her crew survived.
Bonny Lass	United Kingdom	The fishing smack capsized in the North Sea off the coast of Essex with the loss of three of her five crew.
Edwin Fox	United Kingdom	The barque ran aground off Deal, Kent. She was on a voyage from Deal to Wellington, New Zealand. She was refloated and taken in tow for the River Thames.
Français	France	The barque was driven ashore at Middleton, County Durham, United Kingdom with the loss of all but one of her nine or thirteen crew.
Laurel	United Kingdom	The schooner was driven ashore and wrecked at Nidingen, Sweden. She was on a voyage from Turku, Grand Duchy of Finland to Dover, Kent. She was later refloated.
Marie Hélène	Germany	The barque ran aground in the Elbe near Cuxhaven. She was on a voyage from Hamburg to San Francisco, California, United States. She was refloated and towed in to Cuxhaven.
Mongol	United Kingdom	The steamship was wrecked on a reef 14 nautical miles (26 km) off Hong Kong with the loss of sixteen lives. She was on a voyage from Hong Kong to Yokohama, Japan
Pomaron	United Kingdom	The barque was abandoned in the Atlantic Ocean (46°08′N 7°50′W). Her thirteen crew were rescued by the steamship Toscoff (Russia). Pomaron was on a voyage from Pomaron, Portugal to Liverpool, Lancashire.
Risano	Austria-Hungary	The steamship was wrecked near Roscoff, Finistère, France. She was on a voyage from Berdianski, Russia to Antwerp, Belgium.
Thomas and Mary	United Kingdom	The steamship was wrecked at Hartlepool, County Durham with the loss of several lives.
Violet	United Kingdom	The steamship foundered in the English Channel 5 nautical miles (9.3 km) off The Lizard, Cornwall. Her 27 crew were rescued by the barque Prince Llewellyn (United Kingdom). Violet was on a voyage from Nicholaieff, Russia to Bergen, Norway.

== 14 December ==
List of shipwrecks: 14 December 1874
Ship	State	Description
Alliance	United Kingdom	The barque was driven ashore and wrecked near Dungeness, Kent. Her ten crew were rescued by the New Romney Lifeboat Dr. Hatton ( Royal National Lifeboat Institution). Alliance was on a voyage from London to Dieppe, Seine-Inférieure, France.
Américane	France	The schooner was abandoned at "Denzec", Finistère.
Balder	United Kingdom	The ship was driven ashore and wrecked at Flamborough Head, Yorkshire.
Black Diamond	United Kingdom	The steamship caught fire at Belfast, County Antrim and was scuttled.
Duna	Russia	The barque was wrecked near Dungeness. Her thirteen crew were rescued. She was on a voyage from Riga to Dunkirk, Nord, France.
Frances	United Kingdom	The barque was driven ashore and wrecked at Middleton, County Durham, United Kingdom with the loss of eight lives.
Hecla	United Kingdom	The barque foundered off Ouessant, Finistère. Her crew were rescued.
Huma	United Kingdom	The barque ran aground off Deal, Kent. She was on a voyage from North Shields, Northumberland to Carloforte, Sardinia, Italy. She was refloated and taken in to The Downs.
Mary Ann	United Kingdom	The schooner collided with the sloop Only Son (United Kingdom) and was driven ashore at Pakefield, Suffolk, where she was wrecked. Her six crew were rescued by rocket apparatus. Mary Ann was on a voyage from Liverpool, Lancashire to Newcastle upon Tyne, Northumberland.
Niger	France	The barque was wrecked south of "Aracton". Her crew were rescued.
Precursor	United Kingdom	The steamship foundered in the Mediterranean Sea 40 nautical miles (74 km) north west by west of Gozo, Malta. Her seventeen crew were rescued by the barque A. C. Meyer (Germany). Precursor was on a voyage from Marianople, Russia to Plymouth, Devon.
Victoria	United Kingdom	The schooner was towed in to Milford Haven, Pembrokeshire by the steamship Ant (United Kingdom) and sank in the Hubberston Pill. Victoria was on a voyage from Drogheda, County Louth to Swansea, Glamorgan.
Unnamed	Flag unknown	The ship sank at Dungeness.
Unnamed	United States	The ship was driven ashore and wrecked at Audierne, Finistère

== 15 December ==
List of shipwrecks: 15 December 1874
Ship	State	Description
Anna Bello	Italy	The ship was wrecked at East London, Cape Colony. Her crew were rescued.
Argosy	United Kingdom	The ship was sighted in the Atlantic Ocean whilst on a voyage from South Shields, County Durham to Mauritius. No further trace, presumed foundered with the loss of all on board.
Brilliante Giulana	Italy	The barque was wrecked near Arcachon, Finistère, France with the loss of two of her crew. She was on a voyage from Swansea, Glamorgan, United Kingdom to Palermo, Sicily.
Compage	United Kingdom	The schooner was wrecked at East London. Her crew were rescued.
Coquette	United Kingdom	The barque was wrecked at East London. Her crew were rescued.
Emile Marie	France	The barque was wrecked at East London. Her crew were rescued.
Fenwick	(Canada)	The barque was abandoned 5 nautical miles (9.3 km) off St. Ives, Cornwall, United Kingdom. Her crew were rescued by a pilot boat. She was on a voyage from London to Newport, Monmouthshire, United Kingdom.
Floria	United Kingdom	The barque was driven ashore at East London.
Genova	Flag unknown	The steamship ran aground on the Stag Bank, at the mouth of the River Tees and was severely damaged. She was on a voyage from the River Tees to Dunkirk, Nord, France.
Ithuriel	United Kingdom	The barque was severely damaged at East London. She was on a voyage from London to East London.
James Gibson	United Kingdom	The barque was wrecked at East London. Her crew were rescued. She was on a voyage from Penang, Straits Settlements to London.
Kepler	United Kingdom	The steamship ran aground at Gibraltar.
Margaret	United Kingdom	The smack in Loch Leven near Ballachulish, Argyllshire with the loss of all hands.
Mosquito	United Kingdom	The ship was driven ashore and wrecked at Newcastle upon Tyne, Northumberland.
Nova Bella	Italy	The barque was wrecked at East London with the loss of a crew member.
Queen	United Kingdom	The schooner was driven ashore at Lamlash, Isle of Arran.
Rethymo	Ottoman Empire	The steamship collided with the steamship Beta (United Kingdom) in the Bosphorus and was severely damaged. She was beached.
Star of Wales	United Kingdom	The brig was driven ashore and wrecked on the coast of the Natal Colony with the loss of all but two of her crew. She was on a voyage from Australia to a British port.
Syren	United Kingdom	The brig was driven ashore at Lowestoft, Suffolk. Her crew were rescued.
Tiger	United Kingdom	The brig was driven ashore at Lamlash. She was on a voyage from Troon, Ayrshire to Dublin.
Transvaal	United Kingdom	The barque was wrecked on the coast of the Natal Colony with the loss of all but her captain, who was ashore at the time.
Verulam	United Kingdom	The barque was wrecked at East London. Her crew were rescued. She was on a voyage from Penang, Straits Settlements to London.
Western Star	United Kingdom	The barque was wrecked at East London. Her crew were rescued.

== 16 December ==
List of shipwrecks: 16 December 1874
Ship	State	Description
Amalia	United Kingdom	The barque was driven ashore at Lickershamn, Gotland, Sweden. She was on a voyage from Hull, Yorkshire to Skutskär, Sweden.
Annie Arby	United Kingdom	The brig was abandoned in Morte Bay. Her seven crew were rescued by the Ilfracombe Lifeboat.
Brothers	United Kingdom	The pilot cutter was run into and sunk by the tug Vanguard (United Kingdom) at Cardiff, Glamorgan.
Charles Tottie	United Kingdom	The barque ran aground on the Hoburg Shoal, in the Baltic Sea. She was on a voyage from Riga, Russia to London. She was later refloated and found to be leaky. She was towed in to Visby, Sweden for repairs, but was driven ashore and damaged on 22 December. Charles Tottie was refloated on 18 June 1875 and towed to either Oskarshamn or Stockholm, Sweden for repairs.
Cortes	United Kingdom	The steamship foundered in the Bay of Biscay with the loss of 25 of her 29 crew. Survivors were rescued by the barque Osceo ( Canada). Cortes was on a voyage from Cardiff to Aden.
Crimea	United Kingdom	The ship was driven ashore at Wicklow. Her crew were rescued. She was on a voyage from Cardiff, Glamorgan to Strangford, County Antrim.
Eleanor and Mary	United Kingdom	The smack foundered off Maughold Head, Isle of Man. Her crew survived. She was on a voyage from Liverpool, Lancashire to Donaghadee, County Down.
Fanny	United Kingdom	The brig was driven ashore and wrecked at Exmouth, Devon. Her crew were rescued.
Favourite	United Kingdom	The schooner was driven ashore at Wexford. Her crew were rescued by the Wexford Lifeboat Ethel Eveline ( Royal National Lifeboat Institution). Favourite was on a voyage from Newport, Monmouthshire to Wexford.
Freden	Norway	The brig collided with a barque, was driven ashore and wrecked at Dungeness, Kent, United Kingdom. Her crew were rescued.
Horatio	United States	The ship was destroyed by fire at Shanghai, China. She was on a voyage from New York to Shanghai.
Jasper	United Kingdom	The schooner was driven ashore at St. Ives, Cornwall. Her six crew were rescued by the St. Ives Lifeboat Covent Garden ( Royal National Lifeboat Institution). Jasper was on a voyage from Hayle, Cornwall to Cardiff.
Mechanic's Own	United Kingdom	The brigantine was driven ashore at Sandgate, Kent.
Nellie	United Kingdom	The steamship struck the pier at West Hartlepool, County Durham and was beached. She was on a voyage from Schiedam, South Holland, Netherlands to West Hartlepool.
Sofia	Portugal	The brig was driven ashore at Penarth, Glamorgan.
Utility	United Kingdom	The schooner was wrecked in Morte Bay. Her five crew were rescued by the Ilfracombe Lifeboat Broadwater ( Royal National Lifeboat Institution).
Vesper	United Kingdom	The fishing smack was wrecked on the Haisborough Sands, in the North Sea off the coast of Norfolk with the loss of eleven of her twelve crew. Her captain was rescued by the fishing smack Industry (United Kingdom).
Waverley	United Kingdom	The steamship was driven ashore at Hoek van Holland, South Holland. She was on a voyage from Riga to Schiedam. She was refloated and taken in to Maassluis, South Holland in a severely damaged condition.
Unnamed	United Kingdom	The smack ran aground on the Lavan Sands, off Beaumaris, Anglesey. The sole crewman on board was rescued.

== 17 December ==
List of shipwrecks: 17 December 1874
Ship	State	Description
Canova	Norway	The barque was abandoned in the Bay of Biscay. Her crew were rescued by Acadia (United Kingdom). Canova was on a voyage from Bergen to Marseille, Bouches-du-Rhône, France.
Galatz	United Kingdom	The steamship was driven ashore at Dover, Kent. She was on a voyage from Marseille, Bouches-du-Rhône, France to King's Lynn, Norfolk. She was refloated with the assistance of a tug. Towed to London on 19 December for repairs.
Iris	Germany	The steamship ran aground at Cuxhaven. She was on a voyage from Cuxhaven to Stockholm, Sweden.
Japan	United Kingdom	The steamship was destroyed by fire 60 nautical miles (110 km) off Hong Kong. More than 280 people were reported missing. More than 120 survivors were rescued by two United States Navy gunboats. Japan was on a voyage from Yokohama, Japan to Hong Kong.
Manila	United Kingdom	The full-rigged ship foundered. Her crew were rescued by the schooner Rover (United Kingdom). Manila was on a voyage from Birkenhead, Cheshire to Bombay, India.
Marys	United Kingdom	The ship sank off Teulada, Sardinia, Italy. Her crew were rescued.
Normandie	France	The steamship sank at Dunkirk, Nord. She was on a voyage from Dunkirk to Rouen, Seine-Infèrieure.
Perigny	France	The ship was driven ashore at Fort La Hougue, Manche. She was on a voyage from Havre de Grâce, Seine-Inférieure to Puerto Rico.
Utility	United Kingdom	The brig was wrecked on the Baggy Rocks, in Barnstaple Bay. Her crew were rescued.

== 18 December ==
List of shipwrecks: 18 December 1874
Ship	State	Description
Alfred Charles	United Kingdom	The schooner was driven ashore and wrecked at Orfordness, Suffolk with the loss of two of her five crew.
Apolline Emilée	France	The barque ran aground in the Gironde. She was on a voyage from Bordeaux, Gironde to Buenos Aires, Argentina.
Japan	United States	The cargo liner burned off Shantou (Swatow) during her San Francisco-Yokohama-Hong Kong journey with the loss of 395 lives. Most of the victims were Chinese labourers returning from California. Owned by Pacific Mail Steamship Company.
Vesper	United Kingdom	The schooner was abandoned in the Bay of Biscay (46°27′N 8°51′W). Her crew were rescued by the steamship Foochow (United Kingdom). Vesper was on a voyage from Hull to Corfu, Greece.
Victoria	Sweden	The steamship was driven ashore at "Iversted", Denmark. She was on a voyage from London, United Kingdom to Gothenburg.
William and John	United Kingdom	The ship was driven ashore at Cairnbulg, Aberdeenshire. She was on a voyage from Burghead, Moray to West Hartlepool, County Durham. She was refloated and taken in to Fraserburgh, Aberdeenshire in a leaky condition.

== 19 December ==
List of shipwrecks: 19 December 1874
Ship	State	Description
Alfred	United Kingdom	The ship ran aground on the Horse Bank, in the Irish Sea off the coast of Lancashire and was abandoned by her six crew, who were rescued by a fishing boat. Alfred was on a voyage from Swansea, Glamorgan to Barrow-in-Furness, Lancashire. She floated off and came ashore at Southport, Lancashire.
Alma	United Kingdom	The barque was driven ashore and wrecked on the west coast of Gotland, Sweden with the loss of a crew member. She was on a voyage from an English port to Skutskär, Sweden.
Belle	United Kingdom	The smack capsized in the English Channel off Bolt Tail, Devon. Her crew were rescued.
Earl of Dufferin	United Kingdom	The ship was sighted whilst on a voyage from Liverpool, Lancashire to Yokohama, Japan. No further trace, presumed foundered with the loss of all 31 crew.
Flora	Norway	The ship was driven ashore at Sæby, Denmark.
Hilda	United Kingdom	The ship was driven ashore and wrecked at Kåseberga, Sweden. She was on a voyage from Grangemouth, Stirlingshire to Stockholm, Sweden.

== 20 December ==
List of shipwrecks: 20 December 1874
Ship	State	Description
Brenda	United Kingdom	The brig sprang a leak and sank in the North Sea 20 nautical miles (37 km) off Great Yarmouth, Norfolk. Her crew were rescued by the steamship Wynward (United Kingdom). Brenda was on a voyage from Sunderland, County Durham to Rotterdam, South Holland, Netherlands.
Flandre	France	The steamship was driven ashore at Dunkirk, Nord. She was on a voyage from Havre de Grâce, Seine-Inférieure to Dunkirk. She was refloated on 24 December and towed in to Dunkirk.
James and Elizabeth	United Kingdom	The ship ran aground on the West Shoebury Sand, in the Thames Estuary. She was on a voyage from Leith, Lothian to London. She was refloated with the assistance of a tug.
Minerva	United Kingdom	The ship sprang a leak and foundered. Her crew were rescued by Heinrich (Norway. Minerva was on a voyage from Porto, Portugal to Swansea, glamorgan.
Sarah	United Kingdom	The brig ran aground on the Holm Sand, in the North Sea off the coast of Norfolk. Her six crew were rescued by the Caister Lifeboat The Boys ( Royal National Lifeboat Institution). Sarah was on a voyage from Hartlepool, County Durham to London.
St. Nicholas	United Kingdom	The ship put in to Callao, Peru on fire and was scuttled. She was on a voyage from Valparaíso, Chile to San Francisco, California, United States.
Victoria	United Kingdom	The schooner ran aground on the Barber Sand, in the North Sea off the coast of Norfolk and was wrecked. Her five crew were rescued by the Caister Lifeboat The Boys ( Royal National Lifeboat Institution). Victoria was on a voyage from Blyth, Northumberland to Maldon, Essex.
Victoria	United Kingdom	The brig was wrecked on the Barber Sand. Her crew were rescued. She was on a voyage from Blyth to Trouville-sur-Mer, Calvados, France.
Yarrow	United Kingdom	The steamship was driven ashore at Dunkirk.

== 21 December ==
List of shipwrecks: 21 December 1874
Ship	State	Description
Aghios Spiridone	Russia	The brig was wrecked between Gallipoli, Ottoman Empire and Cape Bon, Beylik of Tunis. She was on a voyage from Marseille, Bouches-du-Rhône, France to Algiers, Algeria.
Antonio	Italy	The barque was holed by ice and sank at Altona, Germany.
Canondah	United Kingdom	The schooner was wrecked at Salerno, Kingdom of Italy. Her crew were rescued. She was on a voyage from Bo'ness, Lothian to Salerno.
Pauline Constance Eleonore	Netherlands	The ship was driven ashore. She was refloated and taken in to Batavia, Netherlands East Indies.
Rose of Denmark	United Kingdom	The ship was driven ashore at Dieppe, Seine-Inférieure, France with the loss of a crew member. She was on a voyage from Swansea, Glamorgan to Dieppe. She was a total loss.
Schwan	Germany	The schooner was wrecked on Ameland, Friesland, Netherlands. Her crew were rescued. She was on a voyage from Bremerhaven to Saint Thomas, Virgin Islands.
Victoria	United Kingdom	The schooner was wrecked on the Barber Sand, in the North Sea off the coast of Norfolk. Her crew were rescued by the Caister Lifeboat. She was on a voyage from Blyth, Northumberland to "Sovil".

== 22 December ==
List of shipwrecks: 22 December 1874
Ship	State	Description
County of Sutherland	United Kingdom	The steamship ran aground on the Schaar. She was on a voyage from Batavia, Netherlands East Indies to Rotterdam, South Holland, Netherlands. She was refloated.

== 23 December ==
List of shipwrecks: 23 December 1874
Ship	State	Description
Amici	United Kingdom	The schooner collided with the barque Edwin Fox (United Kingdom) and sank in the River Thames at Woolwich, Kent with the loss of a crew member.
Barlochan	United Kingdom	The ship ran aground on the Longsand, in the North Sea off the coast of Essex. She was on a voyage from Grimsby, Lincolnshire to Smyrna, Ottoman Empire. She was refloated and taken in to Sheerness, Kent in a leaky condition.
Clifton	United Kingdom	The steamship was abandoned in the Atlantic Ocean. Her crew were rescued by the steamship Burgos (United Kingdom). Clifton was on a voyage from Philippeville, Algeria to Dunkirk, Nord, France.
Dio Adelphi	Greece	The brig was driven ashore and wrecked at Mazagan, Morocco.
Fitz James	United Kingdom	The steamship was driven ashore at Adra, Spain. All on board were rescued.
John B. Carleton	United States	The barque caught fire at Kingstown, County Dublin and was scuttled by gunfire from HMS Vanguard (Royal Navy). She was refloated on 29 December.
Jonkheer Evan Keemskerck van Beest	Netherlands	The fishing lugger was run down and sunk in the North Sea by the full-rigged ship Marie Elise (Netherlands). Her crew were rescued by Marie Elise.
Maranon	United Kingdom	The barque caught fire at Antofagasta, Chile.
Nile	United Kingdom	The steamship caught fire at sea. She was on a voyage from Southampton, Hampshire to Barbados. The fire was extinguished by flooding the hold it was in and she completed her voyage.
Vandalia	Germany	The steamship was driven ashore at Clee Ness, Lincolnshire, United Kingdom. She was on a voyage from Hamburg to Grimsby, Lincolnshire. She was refloated with the assistance of four tugs and taken in to Grimsby.
Ystavat	United Kingdom	The ship ran aground on the Nash Sands, in the Bristol Channel. She was refloated and taken in to Penarth, Glamorgan.
Unnamed	Flag unknown	The barque was driven ashore near Newhaven, Sussex.

== 24 December ==
List of shipwrecks: 24 December 1874
Ship	State	Description
Dunbar Castle	United Kingdom	The ship was driven into the Ryde Pier, Isle of Wight and was severely damaged.
Gardyan	United Kingdom	The brig was driven ashore at Porth Neigwl, Caernarfonshire.
Georges	France	The ship was driven ashore. She was refloated and taken in to Harwich, Essex, United Kingdom.
Talisman	Netherlands	The steamship was driven ashore at Hoek van Holland, South Holland.

== 25 December ==
List of shipwrecks: 25 December 1874
Ship	State	Description
Viola	United Kingdom	The ship caught fire in the River Mersey.

== 26 December ==
List of shipwrecks: 26 December 1874
Ship	State	Description
Esperance	France	The ship was sighted off Camaret-sur-Mer, Finistère whilst on a voyage from Bordeaux, Gironde to Leith, Lothian, United Kingdom. No further trace, presumed foundered with the loss of all hands.
Janet	Denmark	The schooner was abandoned in the North Sea. Her crew were rescued by Union (United Kingdom). Janet was on a voyage from Sunderland, County Durham, United Kingdom to Bornholm.
Payta	United Kingdom	The paddle steamer was driven ashore at Santa, Peru. Her crew were rescued.
Russell	United Kingdom	The steamship struck a sunken wreck foundered 9 nautical miles (17 km) off Cape Finisterre, Spain. Her crew survived. She was on a voyage from Nicolaieff, Russia to Cork.

== 27 December ==
List of shipwrecks: 27 December 1874
Ship	State	Description
England's Glory	United Kingdom	The ship ran aground in the Torrens River. She was on a voyage from London to Adelaide, South Australia.

== 28 December ==
List of shipwrecks: 28 December 1874
Ship	State	Description
Anne Maria	Denmark	The ship ran aground on the West Shoebury Sand, in the Thames Estuary off the coast of Essex, United Kingdom. She was on a voyage from London to Helsingør. She was refloated.
Donati	Germany	The ship ran aground in the Elbe. She was on a voyage from Brazil to Cuxhaven. She was refloated.

== 29 December ==
List of shipwrecks: 29 December 1874
Ship	State	Description
Agnes Campbell	United Kingdom	The schooner struck a sunken rock in Loch Inchard and was beached. She was on a voyage from Whitehaven, Cumberland to Thurso, Caithness. She was severely damaged.
Asuncion	Spain	The ship was lost near Santander.
Daniel Morris	United Kingdom	The schooner ran aground and sank at Aberystwyth, Cardiganshire. She was on a voyage from Gothenburg, Sweden to Aberystwyth.
Emily	United Kingdom	The ship was driven ashore near "Vego", Norway. She was refloated and beached at Røn in a severely leaky condition.
Juana	Russia	The barque was driven ashore near Santander, Spain. Her twenty crew were rescued.
Lucy Compton	United Kingdom	The ship was wrecked on the Cabonello Rock, off Porto, Portugal. Her crew were rescued. She was on a voyage from London to Rio de Janeiro, Brazil.
Princess	Denmark	The brig was driven ashore on Inchkeith, Fife, United Kingdom. She was on a voyage from Marstal to Grangemouth, Stirlingshire, United Kingdom. Princess was refloated on 31 January.
Rox	United Kingdom	The ship ran aground on the Bahama Banks. She was on a voyage from Pensacola, Florida, United States to an English port.

== 30 December ==
List of shipwrecks: 30 December 1874
Ship	State	Description
Christian	Norway	The barque was wrecked on "Maleen", near Arendal. Her crew were rescued.
Comet	United Kingdom	The schooner was holed by ice and sank at Antwerp, Belgium. She as on a voyage from Vilvoorde, Flemish Brabant, Belgium to Liverpool, Lancashire.
Consul Platen	Germany	The barque collided with the barque Satsuma (United Kingdom) off the Goodwin Sands, Kent, United Kingdom. She was on a voyage from New York, United States to London, United Kingdom. She was towed in to Gravesend, Kent in a waterlogged condition.
Culmore	United Kingdom	The steamship ran aground at Porto, Portugal. She was on a voyage from Newcastle upon Tyne, Northumberland to Porto. She was refloated.
Farnley Hall	United Kingdom	The steamship ran aground in the Bokkegat. She was on a voyage from Elba, Italy to Rotterdam, South Holland, Netherlands. She was refloated with the assistance of a tug.
Invicta	Spain	The ship was abandoned off Wexford, United Kingdom. She was on a voyage from Liverpool to Havana, Cuba. She was subsequently taken in to Kingstown, County Dublin, United Kingdom.
Osterlide	Norway	The barque grounded off the east end of Galveston Island, Texas, United States. She was on a voyage from Liverpool, Lancashire, United Kingdom to Galveston. She refloated and arrived in Galveston the following day.
Savant	United Kingdom	The schooner was driven ashore at Waterloo, Lancashire. She was on a voyage from Charlestown, Cornwall to Runcorn, Cheshire. She was refloated and resumed her voyage.
Symmetry	United Kingdom	The barque was wrecked on "Buskjar". Her crew were rescued.

== 31 December ==
List of shipwrecks: 31 December 1874
Ship	State	Description
Alvine	Denmark	The ship was wrecked on the Jessengrund. Her crew were rescued. She was on a voyage from Newcastle upon Tyne, Northumberland, United Kingdom to Dragør.
Athlete, and Kestrel	United Kingdom	The schooner Kestrel was run into by the steamship Athlete and sank in the River Avon. Kestrel was on a voyage from Bristol, Gloucestershire to Barbados. Athlete was on a voyage from Liverpool, Lancashire to Bristol. She was beached.
Cimbria	Germany	The steamship ran aground at Glückstadt. She was on a voyage from New York, United States to Glückstadt.
England's Beauty	United Kingdom	The ship was damaged by fire at Dartmouth, Devon.
Jehu	United Kingdom	The barque ran aground at the mouth of the River Tees. She was on a voyage from the River Tees to Aberdeen. She was refloated and resumed her voyage, but put in to Leith, Lothian in a leaky condition.
Marie	Denmark	The ship was wrecked at Varberg, Sweden. She was on a voyage from Blyth, Northumberland to Rønne.
Nil Desperandum	United Kingdom	The sloop was wrecked at Spittal Point, Northumberland with the loss of both crew.
P. J. F. Burchard	United Kingdom	The ship arrived at Montevideo, Uruguay from Leith, Lothian on fire. She was beached and scuttled.
William Coulman	United Kingdom	The steamship ran aground at Maassluis, South Holland, Netherlands.

== Unknown date ==
List of shipwrecks: Unknown date in December 1874
Ship	State	Description
Almiral	Spain	The schooner was wrecked near Arcachon, Gironde, France with the loss of all but one of her crew. Shew as on a voyage from Gloucester, United Kingdom to Bilbao.
Amity	United States	The barque was abandoned at sea with the loss of eighteen of her twenty crew. Survivors were rescued by the barque Norge (Norway). Amity was on a voyage from Philadelphia, Pennsylvania to Antwerp, Belgium.
A. M. Roberts	United States	The brig was driven ashore and wrecked at Santo Domingo Tonalá, Mexico before 2 December.
Arabella	United Kingdom	The ship caught fire at Saint Thomas, Virgin Islands before 17 December and was scuttled. She was refloated.
August André	Belgium	The steamship was deiven ashore near New York, United States. She was on a voyage from Antwerp to New York. She was refloated.
Calista Haws	Canada	The ship ran aground. She was on a voyage from Savannah, Georgia to Pensacola, Florida, United States.
Carmela	Malta	The ship foundered off the Kent coast before 17 December.
Clairellen	United Kingdom	The barque was damaged by fire at Mauritius on or before 23 December.
Dolly Varden	United Kingdom	The ship was wrecked at Dalhousie, New Brunswick, Canada. She was on a voyage from Quebec City, Canada to Campbeltown, Argyllshire.
Edwin	(United States) Washington Territory	The ship was wrecked on the coast of Vancouver Island, British Columbia, Canada before 28 December. She was on a voyage from Utsalady to Adelaide, Queensland.
Eigen	Norway	The ship was driven ashore and wrecked near Molde.
Essequibo	United Kingdom	The steamship ran aground at Colón, United States of Colombia. She was refloated and taken in to Colón.
Eugenie	France	The barque was wrecked on Drummond Island, Michigan, United States before 23 December.
Evergreen	United Kingdom	The ship ran aground in Kepher Bay. She was on a voyage from Liverpool, Lancashire to Constantinople, Ottoman Empire. She was refloated and taken in to the Dardanelles.
Gesu Bambino Giuseppe	Italy	The ship was abandoned 60 nautical miles (110 km) off Cape Palos, Spain before 24 December. Her crew were rescued by a Greek, brig. She was on a voyage from Bône, Algeria to Philadelphia.
Gustav	United States	The ship was driven ashore and wrecked near Zarautz, Spain. Her crew were rescued. She was on a voyage from New York City to Pasaia, Spain.
SMS Helgoland	Austro-Hungarian Navy	The corvette became disabled in the Atlantic Ocean. 300 nautical miles (560 km) off the Azores. She was towed in to São Miguel Island, Azores by the steamship Trinacria (United Kingdom).
Hattie M. Card	Canada	The ship was driven ashore in the Gulf of Saint Lawrence. She was on a voyage from Montreal, Quebec to Callao, Peru. She was refloated and put in to Halifax, Nova Scotia in a leaky condition.
Huron	Germany	The full-rigged ship foundered in the Bay of Biscay before 17 December. Her crew were rescued by the steamship Reubens (United Kingdom).
Jens Ruffen	Norway	The ship was driven ashore at Langsund. She was on a voyage from Christiania to Grangemouth, Stirlingshire, United Kingdom. She was refloated and resumed her voyage.
John Bright	United States	The ship was wrecked off Cabo Sãn Roque, Brazil. She was on a voyage from New York to San Francisco, California.
Juanita	Spain	The full-rigged ship was lost at Bilbao with the loss of eight of her crew.
Juventa	Italy	The ship was abandoned in the Mediterranean Sea. Her crew were rescued by Charles (France).
Louis and Mary	United Kingdom	The ship departed from Vlissingen, Zeeland, Netherlands for Glasgow, Renfrewshire. No further trace, presumed foundered with the loss of all hands.
Marequina	Netherlands	The ship was wrecked at Noordwijk, North Holland, Netherlands.
Martha and Lizzie	United Kingdom	The fishing smack was run down and sunk in Morecambe Bay by Ironsides (United States) with the loss of two of her four crew. Survivors were rescued by Ironsides.
Midge	(United Kingdom of Great Britain and Ireland) Cape Colony	The ship was wrecked in Plattenburg Bay. Her crew were rescued.
Momina Zeno, or Moneno Zeno	Flag unknown	The full-rigged ship was wrecked in Struys Bay with the loss of three lives. She was on a voyage from Bassein, India to Falmouth, Cornwall.
Montejo	Flag unknown	The ship wrecked off the mouth of the "Sona River". She was on a voyage from Panama City, United States of Colombia to "New Granada".
New Lampedo	United Kingdom	The ship caught fire at sea and was abandoned. Her crew were rescued by Star of the West(United Kingdom). New Lampedo was on a voyage from Liverpool to Panama City, United States of Colombia.
Ottolina	Netherlands	The ship caught fire at Batavia, Netherlands East Indies.
Petronella	United Kingdom	The ship was driven ashore near Douarnenez, Finistère, France. She was on a voyage from Liverpool to Africa. She was refloated on 13 December and taken in to Douarnenez in a leaky condition.
Reform	Norway	The ship was abandoned in the North Sea before 10 December.
Reina de los Angeles	Spain	The ship was abandoned in the South China Sea. Her crew were rescued by a British steamship.
Rex	United Kingdom	The ship ran aground on the Bahama Banks. She was on a voyage from Pensacola to an English port
Rica Barica	Austria-Hungary	The brig was abandoned in the Atlantic Ocean before 18 December.
Rjsariden	Flag unknown	The smack was driven ashore at Great Yarmouth. Her crew were rescued.
Sarah King	United Kingdom	The ship departed from Portsmouth, Hampshire for Sunderland, County Durham in early December. No further trace, presumed foundered with the loss of all hands.
Thetis	United Kingdom	The ship ran aground at Campbeltown. She was refloated on 18 December and towed in to Glasgow, Renfrewshire.
Trementere	United Kingdom	The schooner departed from Neath, Glamorgan for Hayle, Cornwall. No further trace, presumed foundered with the loss of all hands.
Unnamed	Netherlands	The ship was driven ashore and wrecked 40 nautical miles (74 km) south of Arcachon with the loss of all hands.
Unnamed	United Kingdom	The collier was driven ashore and wrecked 40 nautical miles (74 km) south of Arcachon with the loss of eight lives.
