= A Centauri =

The Bayer designations A Centauri and a Centauri represent different stars. Due to technical limitations, both designations link here.

- A Centauri, HD 100673, a main sequence star
- a Centauri, V761 Centauri, a variable star

== See also ==
- α Centauri, Alpha Centauri
  - α^{1} Centauri, Alpha Centauri A (HD 128620)
  - α^{2} Centauri, Alpha Centauri B (HD 128621)
- Alpha Centauri (disambiguation)
- 1 Centauri
