= Centaur (disambiguation) =

A centaur is creature from Greek mythology that is half human, half horse.

Centaur, Centaurs or The Centaur may also refer to:

== Arts and entertainment ==
=== Fictional entities ===
- USS Centaur, a spaceship in Star Trek: Deep Space Nine's "A Time to Stand"
- Narnian Centaurs, in C. S. Lewis's Chronicles of Narnia
- Centaur (Dungeons & Dragons)

=== Film ===
- Centaur (2016 film), a Kyrgyzstani film
- Centaur (2023 film), a Russian film
- The Centaurs (1921 film), an animated film

=== Literature ===
- The Centaur, a 1963 novel by John Updike
- The Centaur, a 1911 novel by Algernon Blackwood
- Centaur Publications (1938–1942), one of the earliest American comic book publishers

=== Music ===
- Centaur, an American rock band formed in 2000 by Hum founder Matt Talbott
- "The Centaur," a song by Buck 65 from the 1997 album Vertex

== Businesses and organisations ==
- Centaur Media, a British marketing company
- Centaur Film Company, American motion picture production company founded in 1907
- Centaur Press, later Centaur Books, a New York small publisher, from late 1960s to 1981
- Centaur Press (British publisher), 1954–1998
- Centaur Publications, also known as Centaur Comics, an early American comic book publisher
- Centaur Records, a classical music record label in America
- Centaur Technology, a CPU design company

== Military ==
- Centaur tank, a development of the British Cromwell tank
- AHS Centaur, an Australian hospital ship sunk by the Japanese during World War II
- HMS Centaur, the name of several Royal Navy ships
  - Centaur-class aircraft carrier
- Centaur-class fast assault craft, of the Ukrainian Navy

== Science and technology ==
- Centaur (computing), a memory buffer chip in POWER8 microprocessors
- Centaur (rocket stage), used for space launches
- Centaur (small Solar System body), orbiting between Jupiter and Neptune

== Transportation ==
- Centaur (1849 ship), a brig shipwrecked off Western Australia
- SB Centaur, an 1895 Thames sailing barge
- Acme Centaur, a development of the 1945 Stinson L-13 aircraft
- Rambler Centaur, a 1962 show car by American Motors

== Other uses ==
- Centaur (pinball), a 1981 pinball machine
- Centaur (typeface), a serif typeface
- Centaur chess, or advanced chess
- Centaur Theatre, in Montreal, Quebec, Canada

== See also ==
- Centaure (disambiguation)
- Centauri (disambiguation)
- Centauro (disambiguation)
- Centaurus (disambiguation)
  - Centaurus, a constellation
