= Centaurus (disambiguation) =

Centaurus is a bright constellation in the southern sky.

Centaurus may also refer to:

- Centaurus (Greek mythology), father of the race of mythological beasts
- Centaurus (journal), of the European Society for the History of Science
- Centaurus (spacecraft), a proposed NASA program
- Centaurus (virus), a subvariant of the Omicron variant of SARS-CoV-2
- Bristol Centaurus, a 1938 aircraft engine
- SS Centaurus, a cargo ship, later SS Portmar
- USS Centaurus, the named of two ships of the U.S. Navy
- ELVO Kentaurus, a Greek Armored Infantry Fighting Vehicle
- Centaurus Advisors, a hedge fund run by John D. Arnold
- The Centaurus, a building complex in Islamabad, Pakistan
- Centaurus High School, in Lafayette, Colorado, U.S.
- Centaurus Secondary School, in Windhoek, Namibia

== See also ==
- Centaur (disambiguation)
- Centaure (disambiguation)
- Centauri (disambiguation)
- Centauro (disambiguation)
- Centaurus in Chinese astronomy
- Centaurus A, a galaxy in the constellation of Centaurus
- Centaurus Cluster, a cluster of galaxies in the Centaurus constellation
