= Centauro =

Centauro is the Italian word for centaur.

Centauro also may refer to:

== People ==
- Greg Centauro (1977–2011), French pornographic actor and director

== Military formations ==
- I Mechanized Brigade "Centauro", ancestor of the Italian Army's Mechanized Brigade "Goito"
- III Services Battalion "Centauro", ancestor of the Italian Army's Transit Areas Management Regiment
- 131st Armored Division "Centauro", a World War II Italian Royal Army unit
- 131st Artillery Regiment "Centauro", an inactive Italian Army unit
- 136th Armored Legionary Division "Centauro", a World War II Italian Royal Army unit
- Armored Brigade "Centauro", a post-World War II Italian Army unit
- Artillery Specialists Group "Centauro", ancestor of the Italian Army's 12th Heavy Field Artillery Regiment (Italy)
- Engineer Battalion "Centauro", ancestor of the Italian Army's 131st Engineer Battalion "Ticino"
- Logistic Battalion "Piemonte", an inactive Italian Army unit originally named the Logistic Battalion "Centauro"
- Signal Battalion "Centauro", ancestor of the Italian Army's 231st Signal Battalion "Sempione"

== Aerospace ==
- Centauro (sounding rocket), a family of Argentinian sounding rockets
- Fiat G.55 Centauro, an Italian World War II fighter aircraft

== Ships ==
- Italian ship Centauro, various Italian naval vessels
- Centauro-class patrol boat, a class of Portuguese Navy patrol boats

== Vehicles ==
- Centauro, an Italian tank destroyer, the basis for a family of Italian armored vehicles

== Television and film ==
- Centauro (film), a 2022 Spanish action thriller film
- La querida del Centauro, an American 2016–2017 telenovela

== Other ==
- Centauro (review), a Portuguese monthly literary review
- Centauro event, a kind of anomalous event observed in cosmic-ray detectors

== See also ==
- Centaur (disambiguation)
- Centaure (disambiguation)
- Centauri (disambiguation)
- Centauros Villavicencio, a football club based in Villavicencio, Colombia
- Centaurus (disambiguation)
