= Alpha Centauri b =

Alpha Centauri b or Alpha Centauri B may refer to:

== Stars ==
- Alpha Centauri B (Toliman), the second largest star in the α Cen trinary system

== Planets ==
- Alpha Centauri Ab, an unconfirmed candidate exoplanet orbiting the largest star in the α Cen trinary star system, Rigel Kentarus (α Cen A)
- Alpha Centauri Bb, a disproven exoplanet orbiting the second largest star in the α Cen trinary star system, Toliman (α Cen B)
- Alpha Centauri Cb, an exoplanet orbiting the smallest star in the α Cen trinary star system, Proxima (α Cen C)

== See also ==
- Alpha Centauri AB (binary star)
- Alpha Centauri (disambiguation)
- B Centauri (disambiguation)
- b Centauri b
