= French ship Centaure =

Centaure ('Centaur') is the name of several French ships:

- French ship Centaure (1712), a French Navy ship in service from 1712 to 1756
- French ship Centaure (1746), a French Navy ship that sank in 1750
- French ship Centaure (1757), a 74-gun ship of the line of the French Navy launched in 1757 and captured by the Royal Navy in 1759 and renamed HMS Centaur
- French ship Centaure (1782), a French Navy ship launched in 1782 and destroyed by fire in 1793
- French ship Centaure (1818), an 80-gun Bucentaure-class ship of the line of the French Navy
- French tugboat Centaure (1912), a French Navy tugboat launched in 1912 and renamed Nessus in 1932
- French submarine Le Centaure, a French Navy submarine in commission from 1935 to 1952
- French minesweeper Centaure, a French Navy minesweeper in commission from 1955 to 1970
- French tugboat Centaure (A674), a French Navy tugboat in commission from 1974 to 1999 and transferred to the Turkish Navy

== See also ==
- Centaure-class ship of the line
