= Joseph-Marie-Blaise Coulomb =

French naval engineer (1728–1803)

Joseph-Marie-Blaise Coulomb (Toulon, 5 July 1728 — La Seyne, 2 July 1803) was a French naval engineer.

Born to the Coulomb family of shipbuilders, Joseph-Marie-Blaise Coulomb studied in Toulon and later in the shipbuilding school founded by Duhamel du Monceau. He built over 19 ships for the French Royal Navy, and was ennobled on 6 February 1779 for his services.

== Achievements ==
- Magicienne-class frigates
- Centaure-class ships of the line
- Séduisant-class ships of the line
- Terrible-class ship of the line

== Notes and references ==
=== External links ===
- Joseph-Marie-Blaise Coulomb (1728-1803)
- Solange Ami, Les maîtres constructeurs de la marine à Toulon au XVIIIe siècle, Mémoire en vue de la maîtrise d'histoire, Faculté des lettres et sciences humaines de Nice, 1974.
- Éric Rieth, Le « Livre de construction des vaisseaux » (1683) du maître charpentier toulonnais François Coulomb (1654-1717).
- Archives Nationales, série C/7/74, dossiers Coulomb.
