= Séduisant-class ship of the line =

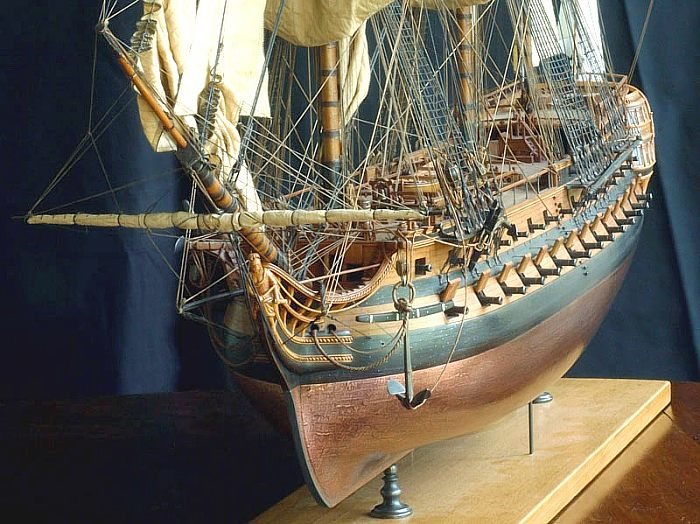
- A 74-gun French ship of the line similar to the Séduisant-class ships of the line

Class overview
- Name: Séduisant
- Builders: Toulon
- Operators: French Navy
- In service: 1783–1798
- Completed: 2

General characteristics
- Type: Ship of the line
- Displacement: 3,010 tonneaux
- Tons burthen: 1,530 port tonneaux
- Length: 56.3 m (184 ft 9 in) (Note: The ship's measurement in 1783 was 173 pieds 3 pouces. The units of measurement pieds (feet) and pouces (inches) were units of measurement in France before the French Revolution; they were slightly larger than the equivalent British feet and inches.)
- Beam: 14.2 m (46 ft 7 in)
- Draught: 7.4 m (24 ft 3 in)
- Complement: 17 officers and 690 men
- Armament: 74 guns

The Séduisant class was a sub-class of 74-gun ships of the line of the French Navy, comprising two ships built at Toulon Dockyard to a design by Joseph-Marie-Blaise Coulomb in the year immediately following the close of the American Revolutionary War. In reality these two ships followed his design for the Centaure class, but were completed with a length greater by 5¼ feet, and had also slightly less breadth and depth in hold.

- Séduisant

Builder: Toulon
Ordered: 1 June 1782
Begun: August 1782
Launched: 5 July 1783
Completed: 1783
Fate: Wrecked, 16 December 1796

- Mercure

Builder: Toulon
Ordered: 1 June 1782
Begun: August 1782
Launched: 4 August 1783
Completed: 1783
Fate: Burnt by the British after the Battle of the Nile, 2 August 1798
