= Centaure-class ship of the line =

1782 class of French Navy ships of the line

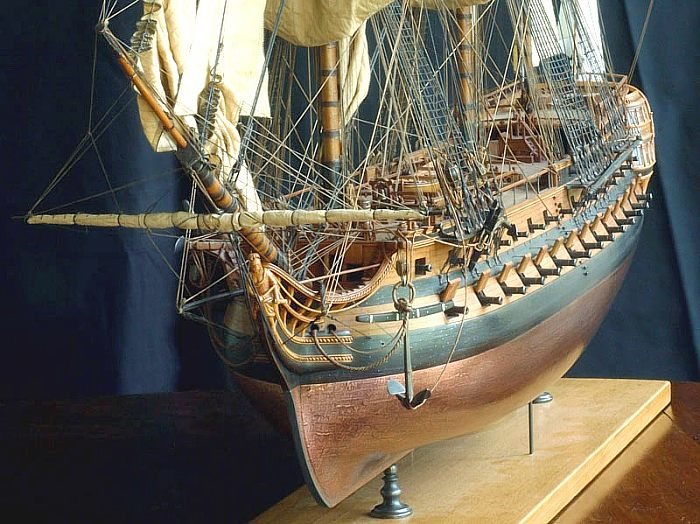
- A 74-gun French ship of the line similar to Centaure-class ships of the line

Class overview
- Name: Centaure
- Builders: Toulon
- Operators: French Navy
- Succeeded by: Téméraire class
- Completed: 4
- Lost: 4

General characteristics
- Type: Ship of the line
- Displacement: 3,010 tonneaux
- Tons burthen: 1,530 port tonneaux
- Length: 54.57 m (179 ft 0 in) (first pair); 56.28 m (184 ft 8 in) (second pair)
- Beam: 14.29 m (46 ft 11 in) (first pair); 14.16 m (46 ft 5 in) (second pair)
- Draught: 7.04 m (23 ft 1 in) (first pair); 7.37 m (24 ft 2 in) (second pair)
- Propulsion: Sail
- Complement: 705 in wartime; 495 in peacetime
- Armament: 74 guns, comprising: Lower deck (1st battery); 28 × 36 pdr guns; Upper deck (2nd battery); 30 × 18 pdr guns; Gaillards (quarter deck & forecastle); 16 × 8 pdr guns.

The Centaure class was a class of 74-gun ships of the line of the French Navy, comprising four ships, all of which built at Toulon Dockyard to a design dated 28 March 1782 by Joseph-Marie-Blaise Coulomb in the year following the close of the American Revolutionary War. The first pair were ordered on 15 February 1782, and were named on 13 April. After the first two ships were begun, the design was amended for the second pair (which were 5¼ feet longer, and also had slightly less breadth and depth in hold) – which are accordingly often described as the Séduisant class. This second pair were ordered on 1 June 1782 and named on 21 August. All four ships were destroyed by the Royal Navy or wrecked during the French Revolutionary Wars.

== Ships in class ==
- Centaure

Builder: Toulon
Ordered: 15 February 1782
Begun: 12 May 1782
Launched: 7 November 1782
Completed: December 1782
Fate: Burnt by the British Navy during the evacuation of Toulon on 18 December 1793.

- Heureux

Builder: Toulon
Ordered: 15 February 1782
Begun: 12 May 1782
Launched: 19 December 1782
Completed: April 1783
Fate: Burnt by the British after the Battle of the Nile, 2 August 1798.

- Séduisant

Builder: Toulon
Ordered: 1 June 1782
Begun: August 1782
Launched: 5 July 1783
Completed: 1783
Fate: Wrecked while sailing from Brest, 16 December 1796

- Mercure

Builder: Toulon
Ordered: 1 June 1782
Begun: August 1782
Launched: 4 August 1783
Completed: 1783
Fate: Burnt by the British after the Battle of the Nile, 2 August 1798
