= Little Island (Western Australia) =

Island near Perth, Western Australia

Coordinates: 31°48′44″S 115°42′33″E

Little Island is a small uninhabited sand and limestone island situated in the Marmion Marine Park just off the coast of Hillarys in Perth, Western Australia. There is a small beach on the north eastern side of the island, however beaching of kayaks is not allowed and walking on the beach is discouraged. The waters around the island are a marine sanctuary, so there is always an excellent array of marine life in the area, including humpback whales, bottlenose dolphins, Australian sea lions and occasionally, wayward sea turtles. It is a site for viewing sea lions and has a snorkelling trail.

== See also ==
- Islands of Perth, Western Australia
- Hillarys Boat Harbour
