= Alpha Centauri (disambiguation) =

Alpha Centauri (or α Cen) is a star system and the collective name of three stars in that system. The individual stars are named Alpha Centauri A, Alpha Centauri B, and Proxima Centauri.

Alpha Centauri may also refer to:

- Alpha Centauri (Doctor Who), an alien in Doctor Who
- Alpha Centauri (horse) (foaled 2015), Irish-trained thoroughbred racehorse
- Sid Meier's Alpha Centauri, a 1999 strategy computer game
- Alpha Centauri (album), an album by Tangerine Dream
- "Alpha Centauri", a song by At the Drive-In from In/Casino/Out
- "Alpha Centauri", a song by Peter Ivers from Terminal Love
- The Alpha Centaurids, a meteor shower

== See also ==
- A Centauri (disambiguation)
- Alpha Centauri b (disambiguation)
- Alpha Centauri in fiction
- Centauri (disambiguation)
- Alpha (disambiguation)
