= Centauri =

Centauri may refer to:

- Centauri Production, a Czech computer games company acquired by Bohemia Interactive
- Centauri, a fictional civilization of Babylon 5
- Centauri, a fictional character in The Last Starfighter

== See also ==
- - Several stars or star systems in the constellation Centaurus
- Alpha Centauri (disambiguation)
- Centaur (disambiguation)
- Centaure (disambiguation)
- Centauro (disambiguation)
- Centaurus (disambiguation)
