= Italian ship Centauro =

Centauro has been borne by at least three ships of the Italian Navy and may refer to:

- Italian torpedo boat Centauro (1906), a Pegaso-class torpedo boat launched in 1906 and lost in 1921.
- Italian torpedo boat Centauro (1936), a Spica-class torpedo boat launched in 1936 and sunk in 1942.
- Italian frigate Centauro, a Centauro-class frigate launched in 1954 and decommissioned in 1985.
