= USS Centaurus =

USS Centaurus may refer to one of these two ships of the United States Navy named after the constellation Centaurus:

- USS Centaurus (AKA-17), launched on 3 September 1943 and acquired by the US Navy on 20 October 1943.
- USS Centaurus (AK-264), acquired from the US Army on 12 June 1951 and lent to South Korea the same day.
