= HD 100673 =

Star in the constellation Centaurus

- Location of A Centauri (circled)

Observation data Epoch J2000.0 Equinox ICRS
- Constellation: Centaurus
- Right ascension: 11^{h} 34^{m} 45.66^{s}
- Declination: −54° 15′ 50.7″
- Apparent magnitude (V): +4.62

Characteristics
- Evolutionary stage: Main sequence
- Spectral type: B9V
- U−B color index: −0.21
- B−V color index: −0.08

Astrometry
| Radial velocity (R_{v}) | +5.7±2.2 km/s |
| Proper motion (μ) | RA: −56.17±0.18 mas/yr Dec.: 16.19±0.20 mas/yr |
| Parallax (π) | 7.65±0.22 mas |
| Distance | 430 ± 10 ly (131 ± 4 pc) |
| Absolute magnitude (M_{V}) | −0.96 |

Details
| Mass | 3.58±0.05 M_{☉} |
| Radius | 4.7 R_{☉} |
| Luminosity | 306 L_{☉} |
| Surface gravity (log g) | 3.54 cgs |
| Temperature | 10,600 K |
| Metallicity [Fe/H] | 0.50 dex |
| Rotation | 0.733 days |
| Rotational velocity (v sin i) | 160 km/s |
| Age | 238 Myr |

Other designations
- A Cen, CPD−53°4637, FK5 2926, GC 15877, HD 100673, HIP 56480, HR 4460, SAO 239189

Database references
| SIMBAD | data |

HD 100673, also known as A Centauri, is a single star in the southern constellation of Centaurus. It is blue-white in hue and is faintly visible to the naked eye with an apparent visual magnitude of +4.62. The star is located at a distance of approximately 430 light-years from the Sun based on stellar parallax. It appears to be drifting further away with a radial velocity of around +6 km/s.

This is a rapidly rotating Be star, showing an emission-line spectrum on top of the normal absorption spectrum of the star, due to a circumstellar disk of ejected matter. It doesn't show any absorption lines from the disk. It is a B-type main-sequence star with a stellar classification of B9V.
