= French ship Mercure (1783) =

Ship of the line of the French Navy

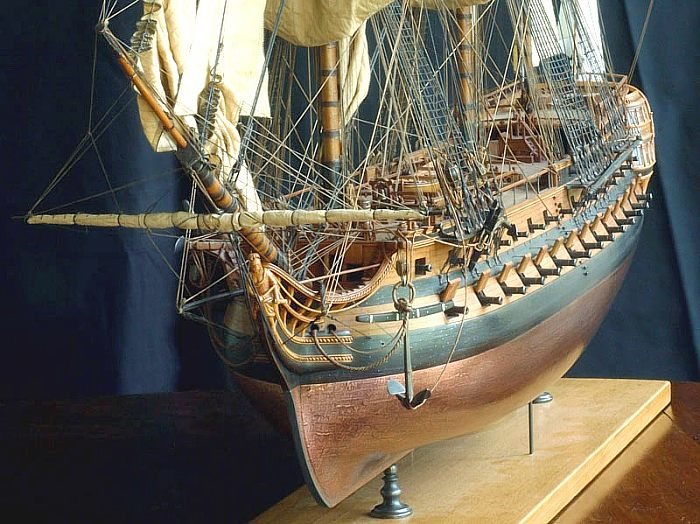
- A 74-gun French ship of the line similar to Mercure

History

France
- Name: Mercure
- Namesake: Mercury
- Ordered: 1 June 1782
- Builder: Toulon
- Laid down: August 1782
- Launched: 4 August 1783
- Commissioned: 1783
- Fate: Captured and burnt 2 August 1798

General characteristics
- Class & type: Séduisant-class ship of the line
- Displacement: 3,010 tonneaux
- Tons burthen: 1,530 port tonneaux
- Length: 56.3 m (184 ft 9 in)
- Beam: 14.2 m (46 ft 7 in)
- Draught: 7.4 m (24 ft 3 in)
- Complement: 600
- Armament: 74 guns

Mercure was a 74-gun Séduisant-class ship of the line of the French Navy.

Captured by the British in Toulon in August 1793, but was retaken by French forces in December 1793.

She took part in the Battle of the Nile under Captain Cambon. She fought against HMS Majestic and was captured by HMS Alexander. Damaged beyond repair and aground, she was burnt.

== See also ==
- List of ships captured in the 18th century
