= French ship Séduisant (1783) =

Ship of the line of the French Navy

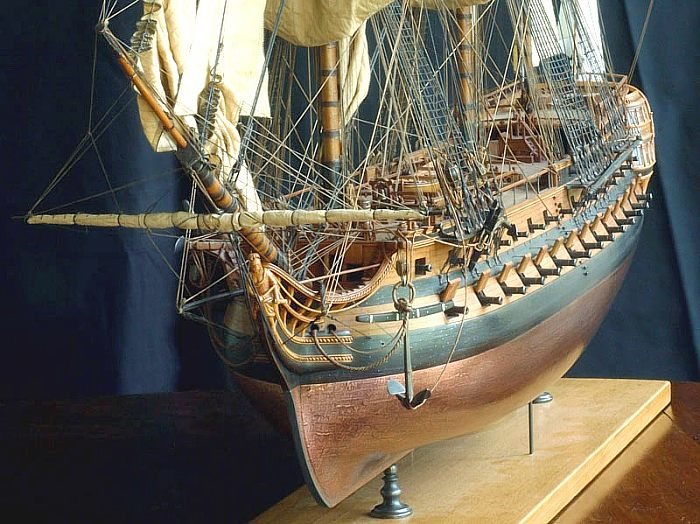
- A 74-gun French ship of the line similar to Séduisant

History

France
- Name: Séduisant
- Namesake: As Séduisant; French: "Seducing"; As Pelletier; Louis-Michel le Pelletier (Note: Variously spelt Peletier, Pelletier, Lepeletier or Lepelletier.)
- Ordered: 1 June 1782
- Builder: Toulon
- Laid down: August 1782
- Launched: 5 July 1783
- Commissioned: 1783
- Renamed: Pelletier on 30 September 1793; Séduisant again on 30 May 1795
- Fate: Wrecked, 16 December 1796

General characteristics
- Class & type: Séduisant-class ship of the line
- Displacement: 3,010 tonneaux
- Tons burthen: 1,530 port tonneaux
- Length: 56.3 m (184 ft 9 in)
- Beam: 14.2 m (46 ft 7 in)
- Draught: 7.4 m (24 ft 3 in)
- Complement: 600
- Armament: 74 guns

Séduisant was a 74-gun ship of the line of the French Navy, lead ship of her class.

She was renamed Pelletier on 30 September 1793, in honour of Louis Michel le Peletier de Saint-Fargeau. Under Savary, she was one of the last ships of the line at the Glorious First of June.

On 30 May 1795 her name was changed back to Séduisant. She sank accidentally on 16 December 1796 while leaving Brest for the Expédition d'Irlande. Out of 600 crew and 610 soldiers, only 60 survived. Other sources speak of 650–680 survivors. The wreck was rediscovered in 1986.
