= French ship Centaure (1782) =

Ship of the line of the French Navy

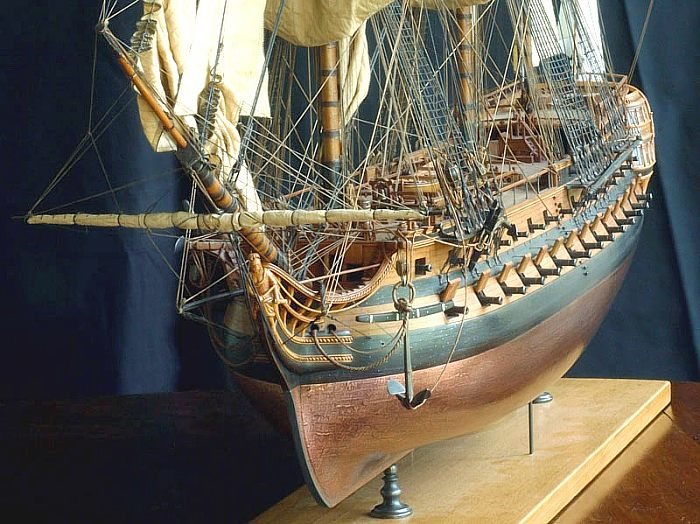
- A 74-gun French ship of the line similar to Centaure

History

France
- Name: Centaure
- Namesake: "Centaur"
- Ordered: 15 February 1782
- Builder: Toulon
- Laid down: 12 May 1782
- Launched: 7 November 1782
- In service: December 1782
- Fate: Burnt by the British at the evacuation of Toulon, 18 December 1793

General characteristics
- Class & type: Centaure-class ship of the line
- Displacement: 3,010 tonneaux
- Tons burthen: 1,530 port tonneaux
- Length: 54.6 m (179 ft 2 in)
- Beam: 14.3 m (46 ft 11 in)
- Draught: 7 m (23 ft 0 in)
- Propulsion: Sail
- Armament: 74 guns

Centaure was the name ship of the Centaure class of 74-gun ships of the line of the French Navy.

She was surrendered to the Anglo-Spanish forces at Toulon on 29 August 1793. When Toulon was evacuated by the Allies, the British burnt this ship (among others) on 18 December 1793. The remains were refloated in 1805 and taken to pieces in the following year.
