= HD 102964 =

Star in the constellation Centaurus

B Centauri
- Location of B Centauri (circled)

Observation data Epoch J2000.0 Equinox ICRS
- Constellation: Centaurus
- Right ascension: 11^{h} 51^{m} 08.69149^{s}
- Declination: −45° 10′ 24.4890″
- Apparent magnitude (V): +4.47

Characteristics
- Spectral type: K3III
- B−V color index: +1.283±0.052

Astrometry
| Radial velocity (R_{v}) | +2.2±2.7 km/s |
| Proper motion (μ) | RA: -73.088 mas/yr Dec.: -8.170 mas/yr |
| Parallax (π) | 7.4043±0.1863 mas |
| Distance | 440 ± 10 ly (135 ± 3 pc) |
| Absolute magnitude (M_{V}) | −1.14 |

Details
| Mass | 1.16 M_{☉} |
| Radius | 39.0+1.2 −5.4 R_{☉} |
| Luminosity | 480±14 L_{☉} |
| Surface gravity (log g) | 1.32 cgs |
| Temperature | 4,325+251 −65 K |
| Metallicity [Fe/H] | −0.03 dex |

Other designations
- B Cen, CD−44°7614, FK5 446, GC 16226, HD 102964, HIP 57803, HR 4546, SAO 223062

Database references
| SIMBAD | data |

HD 102964, also known as B Centauri, is a single star in the southern constellation of Centaurus. It has the identifier HD 102964 in the Henry Draper catalogue; B Centauri is the star's Bayer designation. This object has an orange hue and is faintly visible to the naked eye with an apparent visual magnitude of +4.47. The star is located at a distance of approximately 440 light years from the Sun based on parallax, and has an absolute magnitude of −1.14.

This object is an aging giant star with a stellar classification of K3III, indicating the star has exhausted the supply of hydrogen at its core then cooled and expanded off the main sequence. At present it has 39 times the girth of the Sun. It is radiating 480 times the luminosity of the Sun from its enlarged photosphere at an effective temperature of 4,325 K.
