= Marmion Marine Park =

Marine park in Perth, Western Australia

- IUCN category II (national park)
- Location within Western Australia
- Location: Western Australia
- Nearest city: Perth
- Coordinates: 31.801°S 115.706°E
- Area: 9,499 ha (36.68 sq mi)
- Established: 13 March 1987
- Governing body: Department of Biodiversity, Conservation and Attractions

The Marmion Marine Park is a protected area along and off the coast of northern Perth, Western Australia.

In 1987, this park was declared the first marine park in Western Australia. The park covers an area of 10,500 ha, from Trigg Island in the south to Burns Beach in the north.

Limestone reefs run parallel to the coastline and contain underwater limestone platforms and caves that hide many species of tropical fish.

Several other animals visit this area regularly, including the Australian sea lion and the bottlenose dolphin. Humpback whales frequent the waters in May on their journey north. When they return between September and November, they are in breeding, making them easier to see by tourists.

== See also ==
- List of islands of Perth, Western Australia
- Little Island (Western Australia)
- Centaur (1849 ship)
- Protected areas of Western Australia
