= B Centauri b =

Long-period exoplanet orbiting b Centauri

b Centauri b
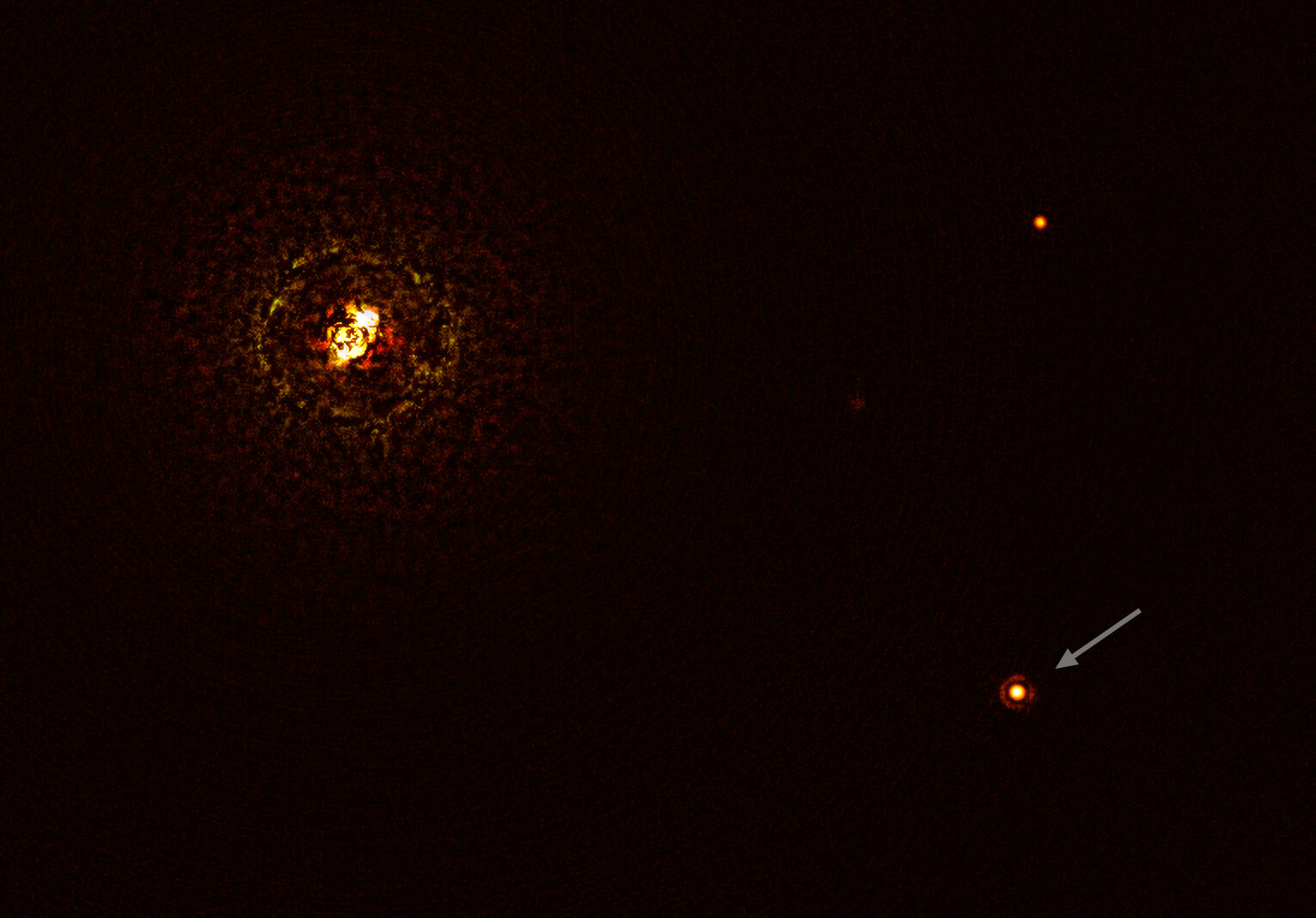
- b Centauri imaged by VLT/SPHERE. The planet b Centauri b is indicated by an arrow.

Discovery
- Discovered by: SPHERE
- Discovery date: 2021
- Detection method: Direct imaging

Orbital characteristics
- Semi-major axis: 556±17 AU
- Eccentricity: 0.4
- Orbital period (sidereal): 7170±2650 years
- Inclination: 157°±128°
- Star: b Centauri

Physical characteristics
- Mean radius: 1.11 R_{J}
- Mass: 10.9±1.6 M_{J}

b Centauri b (sometimes b Centauri (AB)b) is a circumbinary planet orbiting the binary star system b Centauri, located in the southern constellation Centaurus. The planet is a super-Jupiter, with a mass 10.9 times that of Jupiter.

== Discovery ==
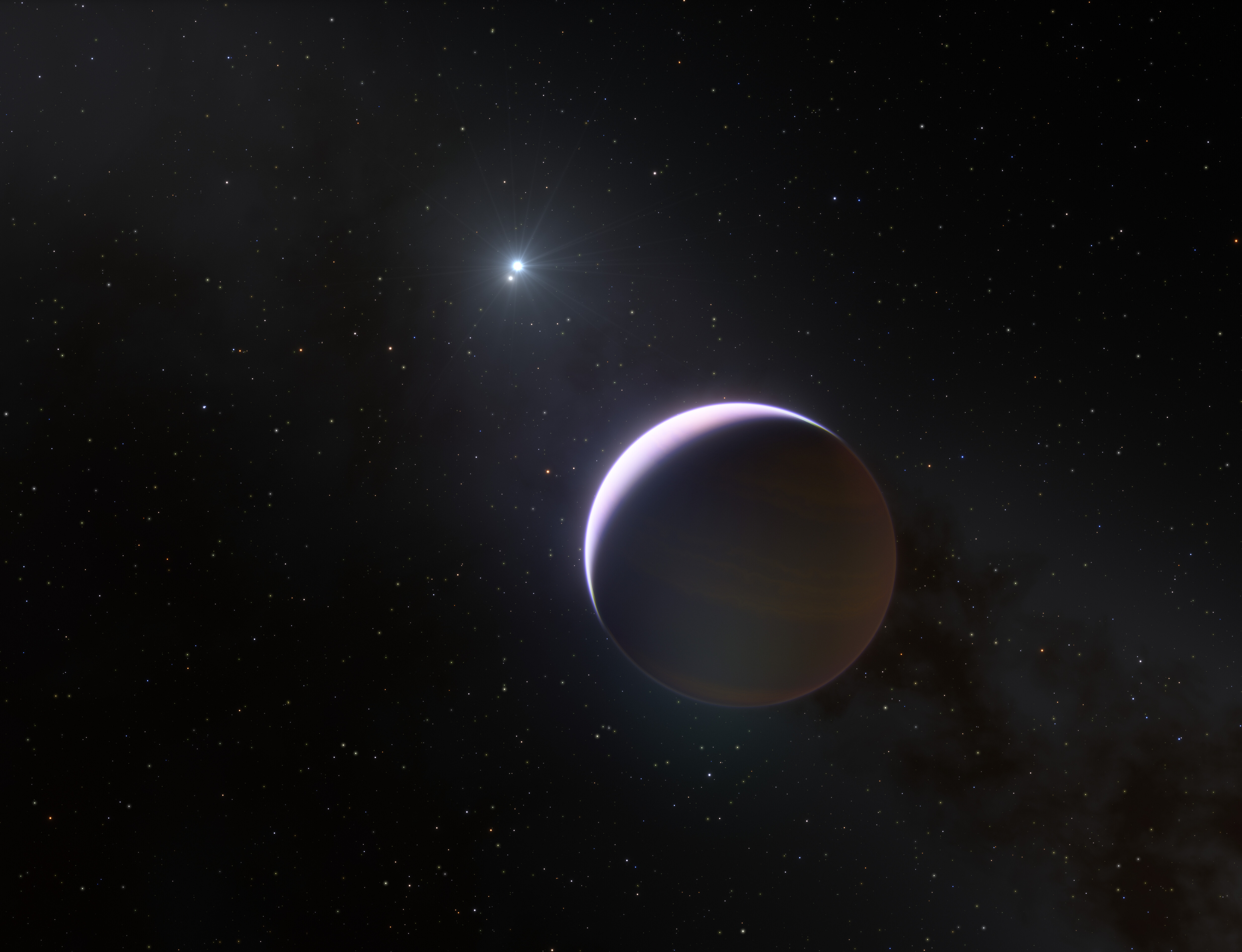
Artist's impression showing b Centauri b. b Centauri is in the background.

The b Centauri system was included in the BEAST survey, which uses the SPHERE instrument at the Very Large Telescope to search for planets around B-type stars in the Scorpius–Centaurus association. SPHERE is equipped with a sophisticated coronagraph that blocks out the light from a star and allows exoplanets around it to be directly imaged. The first observation of the system in 2019 revealed an object at a 5.3 arcseconds separation that had infrared colors consistent with a massive planet. A second observation in 2021 confirmed that the object has common proper motion with b Centauri and therefore is physically bound to the system. The authors of this study also looked for old observations of b Centauri and found that the planet had been imaged by the ESO 3.6 m Telescope in 2000, but was considered a background star at the time. With a primary star mass of 5–6 M_{☉} and a total system mass of 6–10 M_{☉}, b Centauri is the most massive system around which a planet has been found; previously, the most massive star with a known planet was 3 M_{☉}. The discovery was published in December 2021 on the scientific journal Nature and was led by Stockholm University astronomer Markus Janson.

Named b Centauri (AB)b (shortened as 'b Cen (AB)b'), it is a circumbinary planet that orbits the stellar pair at a projected separation of 560 AU. The three epochs of observations show evidence of the orbital motion of the planet around the central stars, but the orbit is still not well constrained. The data are consistent with an orbital period between 2650 and 7170 years, inclination between 128 and 157 degrees, and eccentricity smaller than 0.4.

The SPHERE images show the planet has approximately 0.01% the solar luminosity, a relic of its recent formation. From this luminosity and the age of the system, cooling models predict it has a mass of about 11 times the mass of Jupiter. The mass ratio between b Cen (AB)b and the central binary star is 0.10—0.17%, which is similar to the Sun-Jupiter system and is consistent to the expectations that more massive stars tend to have more massive planets.

== Formation ==
The formation mechanism for b Cen (AB)b is uncertain. It is believed that most giant planets are formed via core accretion, in which a rocky core, after growing to a critical mass, starts rapidly accreting the surrounding gas of the circumstellar disc. This mechanism cannot explain b Cen (AB)b, because core accretion becomes less efficient at large distances from the star, and massive stars like b Centauri A cause the disc to dissipate much quicker. It is more probable that the planet formed directly from the circumstellar gas, through a mechanism known as gravitational instability. This process is much faster than core accretion and can act even at separations of hundreds of astronomical units. Another possibility is that the planet formed closer to the central stars and was subsequently ejected to its current orbit through interactions with another body, but this is disfavored by the lack of evidence of other planets in the system and by the low eccentricity of b Cen (AB)b.

The discovery of b Cen (AB)b showed that planets can exist even around massive stars. Previous studies had shown that planet occurrence rate starts to drop for stars over 2 M_{☉} and reaches almost zero for 3 M_{☉} stars, but this result is valid only for close in planets, which the radial velocity method can detect. The discovers of b Cen (AB)b argued that the short lifetime of the circumstellar discs around massive stars may prevent planets from migrating closer to their stars, but allows the existence of distant planets like b Cen (AB)b.
