= Centaur (1849 ship) =

Shipwreck off Western Australian coast

Coordinates: 31.86376°S 115.711118°E

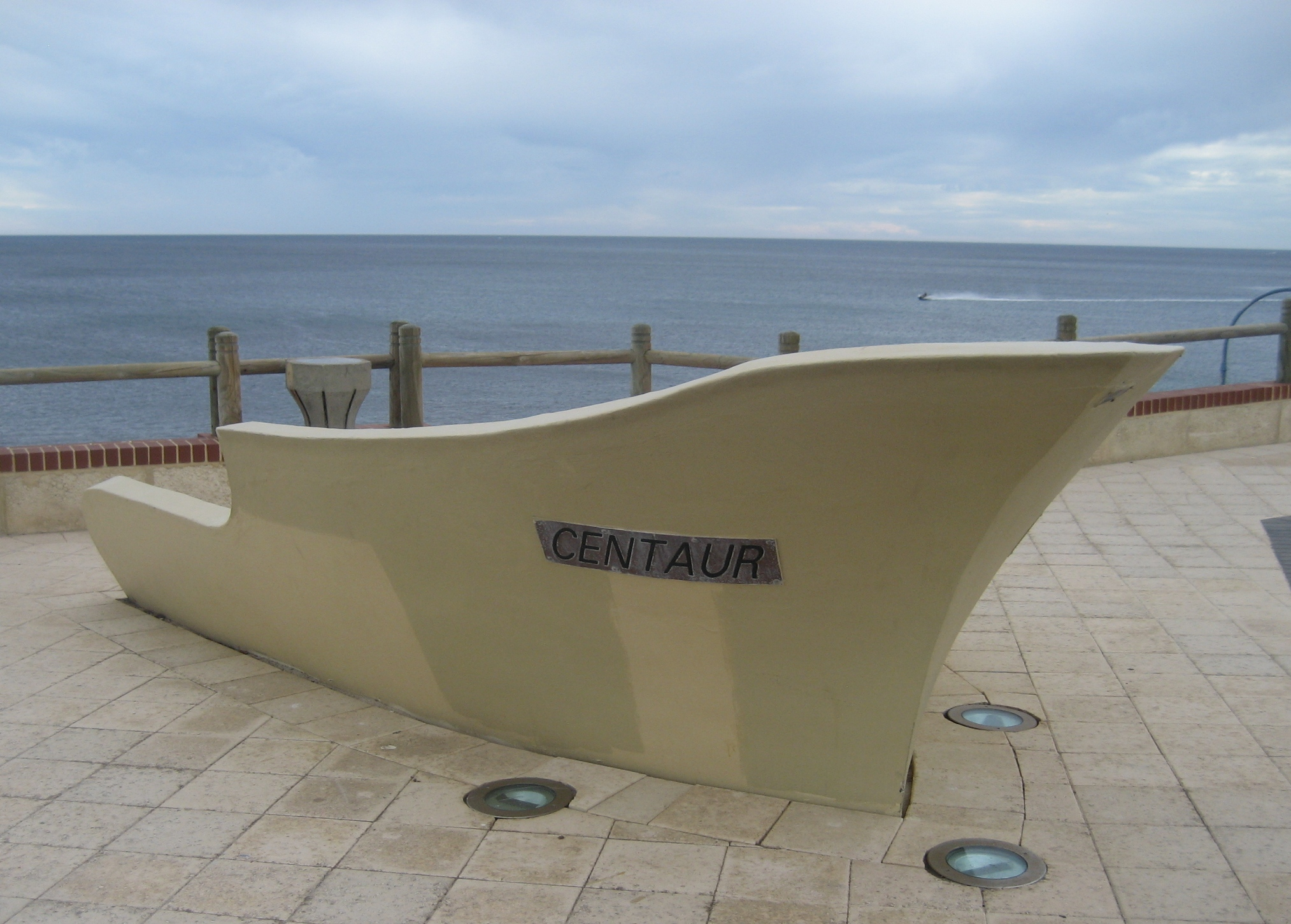
Centaur memorial at North Beach

Centaur was a 188-ton iron brig built in Aberdeen, Scotland, in 1849.

Centaur sank after striking the southern section of Marmion Reef on 9 December 1874 while travelling from Champion Bay to Fremantle. All nine crew and four passengers, including noted politician and lawyer Septimus Burt, survived. The 30-metre (98 ft) brig was carrying 200 tonnes (450 thousand pounds) of galena when she struck the reef, about 3.7 kilometres (2.3 mi) offshore.

The reef is now named Centaur Reef, and is part of Marmion Marine Park north of Perth, Western Australia.
