= French fleet at the siege of Toulon =

1793–94 fleet in the French Revolutionary Wars

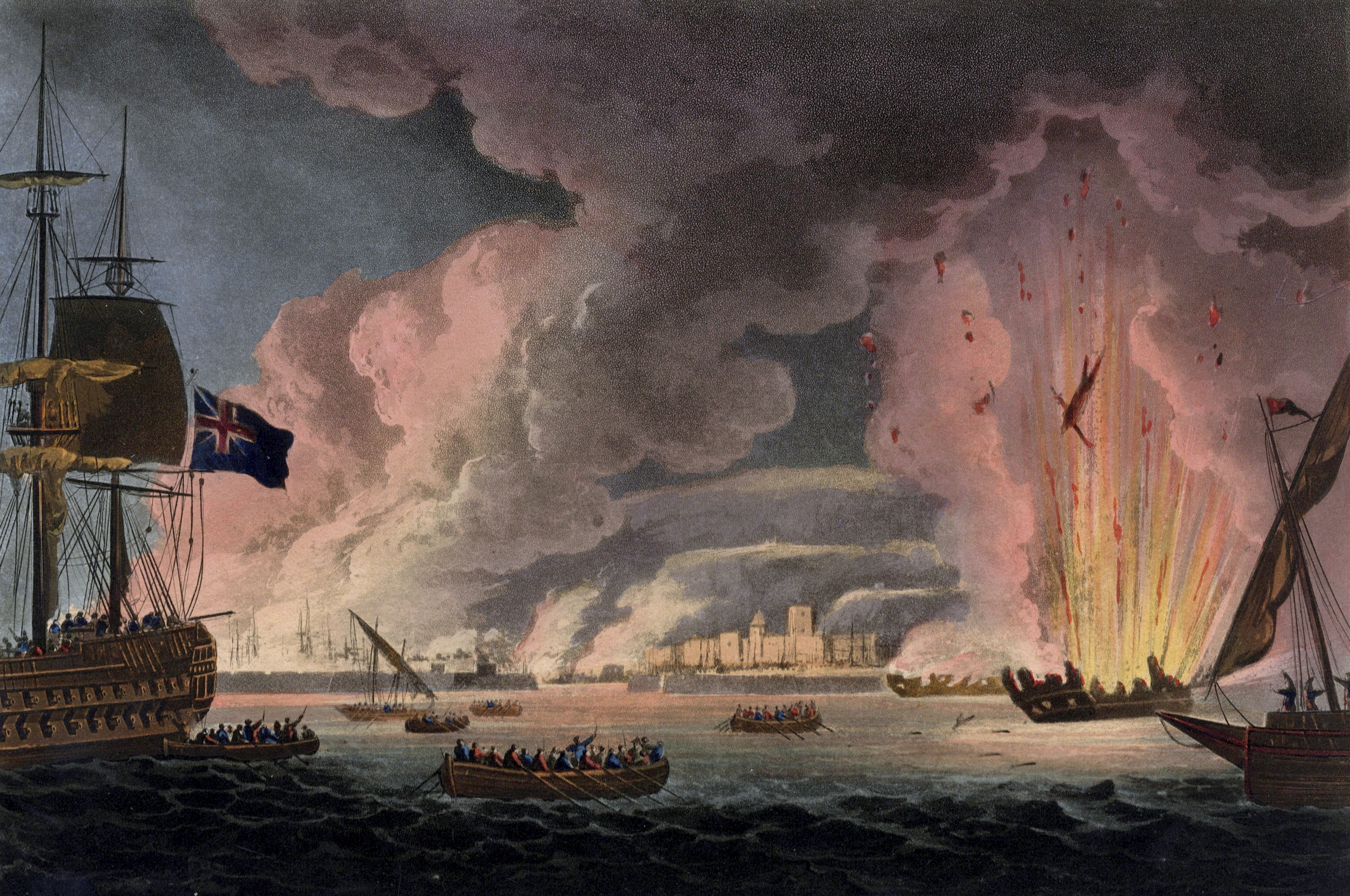
Illustration of destruction of the French fleet at Toulon

The fate of the French fleet at the siege of Toulon marked one of the earliest significant operations by the Royal Navy during the French Revolutionary Wars. In August 1793, five months after the National Convention declared war on Great Britain, thus drawing Britain into the ongoing War of the First Coalition, the government of the French Mediterranean city of Toulon rose up against the Republican national government in favour of the Royalist faction. Toulon was the principal French naval port on the Mediterranean and almost the entirety of the French Mediterranean Fleet was anchored in the harbour. After negotiations with the British commander in the Mediterranean, Admiral Lord Hood, the city's Royalists seized control and British forces, alongside allies from Spain, Naples and Sardinia entered the city, seizing the fleet and preparing defences against the inevitable Republican counterattack.

Although powerfully fortified against attack by sea, Toulon's extensive defences on the landward side of the city had been designed to be held by substantial numbers of troops, something the allies conspicuously lacked. This weakness would be ruthlessly exposed by a highly effective Republican artillery campaign commanded by Captain Napoleon Bonaparte. Political disputes with the Italian allies prevented reinforcements reaching the defenders and the defeat of Royalist forces elsewhere in France gave strength to the besieging army. On 17 December the Republican forces captured heights overlooking the harbour and the defenders' situation became untenable. Hood ordered an evacuation and as the Allied forces staged a fighting withdrawal British Captain Sir Sidney Smith and Spanish Don Pedro Cotiella volunteered to lead boat parties into the harbour to destroy the French fleet, which remained at anchor.

The boat parties came under heavy fire from the shore as they used fireships to ignite the anchored warships, Smith concentrating on those ships in the New Arsenal while the Spanish were instructed to burn the warehouses and Old Arsenal. For reasons that remain unclear, but which British historians have sometimes attributed to treachery, the Spanish failed to destroy the ships they were tasked with, and as the force withdrew detonated two powder hulks they were instructed to sink dangerously close to Smith's men, killing several. By morning of 19 December, eight French ships of the line and three frigates had been destroyed, while Hood had successfully removed three ships of line and six frigates which were distributed to the Allied navies. As Smith burnt the fleet, ships from the British squadron at Toulon successfully removed the Allied garrison as well as more than 14,000 Royalist refugees. The remainder of the French Mediterranean Fleet survived and was repaired during 1794, participating in many of the battles which followed.

== Siege of Toulon ==
1842 painting of the siege of Toulon

The War of the First Coalition, the first of the French Revolutionary Wars, began on 20 April 1792 when the French Assembly voted to declare war on the Austrian Empire. Fighting was confined mainly to the Austrian Netherlands and Northern Italy until the execution of King Louis XVI on 21 January 1793. Within days, France had also declared war on Great Britain, the Netherlands and Spain. By the summer of 1793 the increasing radicalisation of the French Assembly had alienated much of Southern France, and a series of Royalist uprisings broke out in August.

One of the most serious rebellions was at Toulon, a large port city on the Mediterranean Sea and the principal naval base for the formidable French Mediterranean Fleet, numbering 31 ships of the line under the command of the Royalist Counter-admiral Jean-Honoré de Trogoff de Kerlessy. This powerful force was blockaded by a Royal Navy fleet of 21 ships of the line sent from Britain at the outbreak of war under the command of Admiral Lord Hood and on 23 August two representatives of Royalist governments from across Southern France approached Hood's flagship HMS Victory to negotiate terms of an alliance. There were however no delegates from the city of Toulon, the loyalty of which was central to control of the region.

=== Capture of Toulon ===
Royalist control of Toulon was not assured, particularly since there was a strong Republican faction in the fleet, led by Counter-admiral Saint-Julien, and to establish which faction controlled the city Hood sent Lieutenant Edward Cooke into the harbour on 24 August with instructions to meet with the Royalist leader in Toulon. Cooke was forced to approach the harbour in darkness to avoid Republican naval patrols, but was successful in bypassing them, having visited the harbour under during temporary truce in July, and sending a message to the Royalist party. Julien learned of Cooke's presence and spread word that if he should capture Cooke he was to have him hanged, but Cooke, who had sheltered on shore overnight, returned to the city the following day to meet with the Royalist delegates. During the discussions he was able to negotiate for the seizure and disarmament of the French fleet by the British in exchange for protection for the city of Toulon, on the understanding that when the Republicans had been defeated and the French monarchy restored all would be returned to France. On his return to the British fleet, his boat was intercepted by a French frigate, and it was only by careful manoeuvres in shallow water under fire from the frigate's boats that he returned safely. On 26 August Cooke returned to the port with a Royalist naval officer, to discover that Julien had seized control of the fleet and promised to resist the British if they entered the port. To this end, Republican sailors had occupied Fort Lamalgue and other defensive positions on the western bluffs overlooking the harbour. On 27 August Hood landed a small expeditionary force under Captain George Elphinstone and drove the Republican forces off, Julien and more than 5,000 French sailors retreating inland.

With British forces controlling the batteries overlooking the harbour, the remaining Republicans capitulated. On 28 August those ships of the French fleet still anchored in the roads were moved into the arsenals as Hood brought the British fleet, supported by 17 Spanish ships of the line under Admiral Juan de Lángara into port. Command of the city was granted to Rear-admiral Samuel Goodall and command of the defences to the Spanish Admiral Federico Gravina. During early September French Republican armies slowly advanced on Toulon under the command of General Jean François Carteaux to the west and General Jean François La Poype to the east. Concerned by the lingering Republican faction in Toulon, most strongly represented by 5,000 discharged sailors, Hood ordered that four ships and a corvette be released from the seized French fleet, disarmed, and used as cartels to convey the sailors to Republican ports on the Atlantic. These ships, Apollon, Entreprenant, Orion, and Patriote, plus the corvette Pluvier, sailed on 14 September, arriving at their destinations in mid-October.

=== Fighting on the heights ===
In late September heavy fighting began for control of the high ground which overlooked the harbour. Republican shore batteries exchanged fire with Royal Navy ships during which HMS Princess Royal suffered heavy casualties in an ammunition explosion, and on 30 September Republican troops under Captain Napoleon Bonaparte captured the hill of Pharon, only to be driven off the following day by a combined force of British, Spanish, Neapolitan and Sardinian soldiers under Lord Mulgrave. In early October Neapolitan reinforcements encouraged a series of successful assaults on the Republican held heights, but later in the month Hood and Lángara had a serious disagreement over command of the siege, Lángara going so far as to threaten Hood's flagship Victory before ultimately backing down. At the end of the month the allies mustered more than 16,000 men, including 6,000 Spanish troops. The British contribution was just over 2,000 men, reduced by the Royal Navy's commitments elsewhere in the Mediterranean. A substantial body of Austrian reinforcements was expected from Genoa, but were prevented from embarking by a combination of Austrian intransigence and Genoese anger at the British violation of their neutrality during the raid on Genoa. So short of troops were the Allies that Hood hired 1,500 mercenaries from the Knights of Malta, although they did not arrive before the conclusion of the siege. Republican forces were growing rapidly during this period as reinforcements released by the conclusion of the Siege of Lyon reached the besiegers at Toulon, the Republican army mustering approximately 33,000 soldiers under General Jacques François Dugommier.

== Fall of Toulon ==
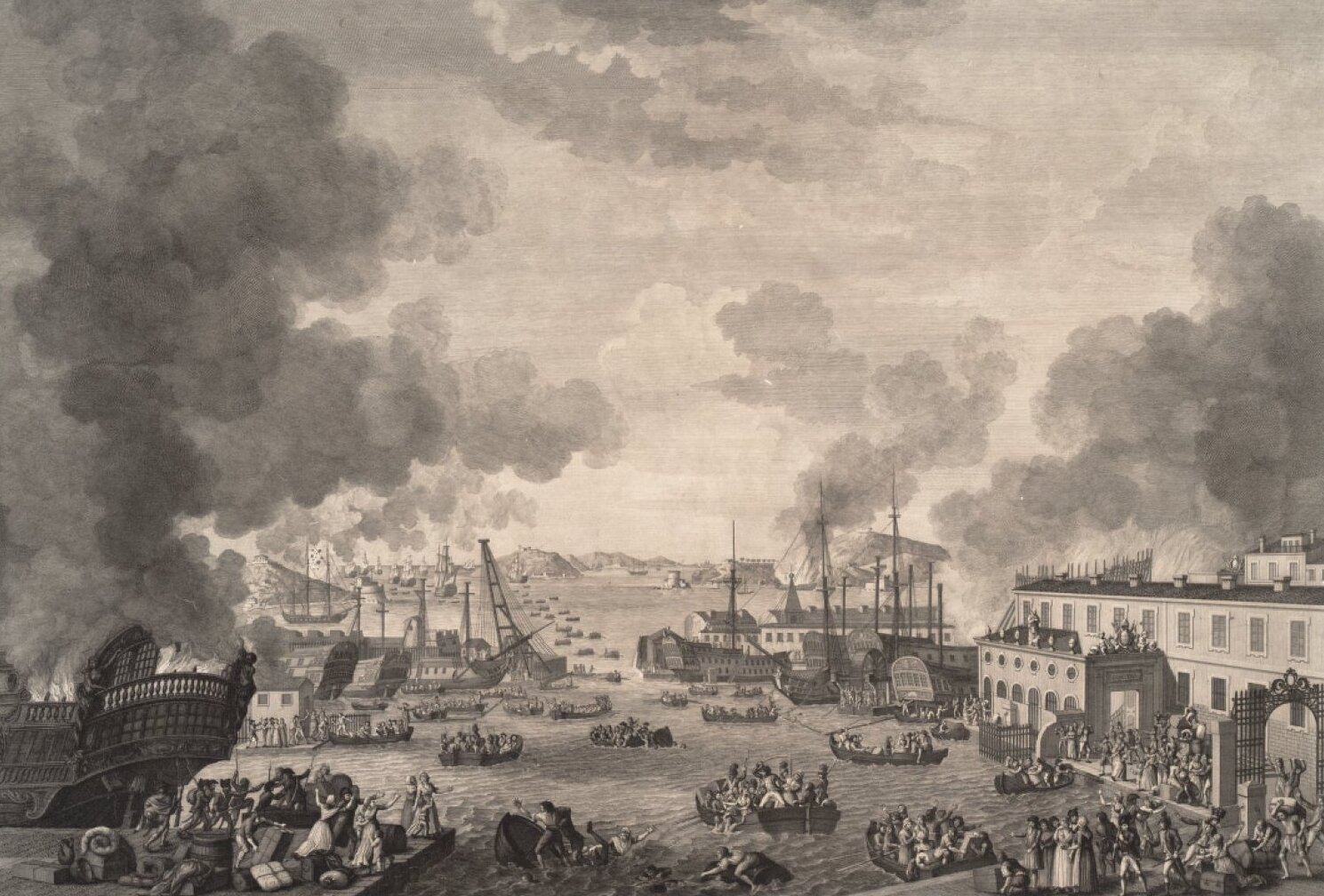
Illustration of the evacuation of Toulon

A major Republican attack was repulsed on 15 November but an Allied counterattack on 30 November was also defeated. After further reinforcement, Dugommier ordered a three-pronged assault on the defences of Toulon on 14 December. On 17 December the Spanish-held redoubt of Fort Mulgrave and the heights of Pharon were taken and Republican batteries mounted. The French cannon now covered the harbour and city, forcing the Allied fleets to withdraw from the roads to avoid bombardment. With the British and Spanish fleets traveled those French ships which remained in the roads crewed by French Royalist volunteers, including three ships of the line Pompée, Puissant and the huge 120-gun Commerce de Marseille, six frigates and eight corvettes.

With the defences now fatally undermined, a council of the senior officers concluded that evacuation was the only option for the Allied forces. The defenders would conduct a fighting withdrawal to the docks while Lángara undertook to destroy the seized French fleet. The plan was almost immediately undermined by a panic among the Neapolitan contingent, who abandoned their posts and fled into the city. By the evening of 18 December however all of the Allied troops had retreated to the waterfront in preparation for embarkation.

=== Destruction of the French fleet ===
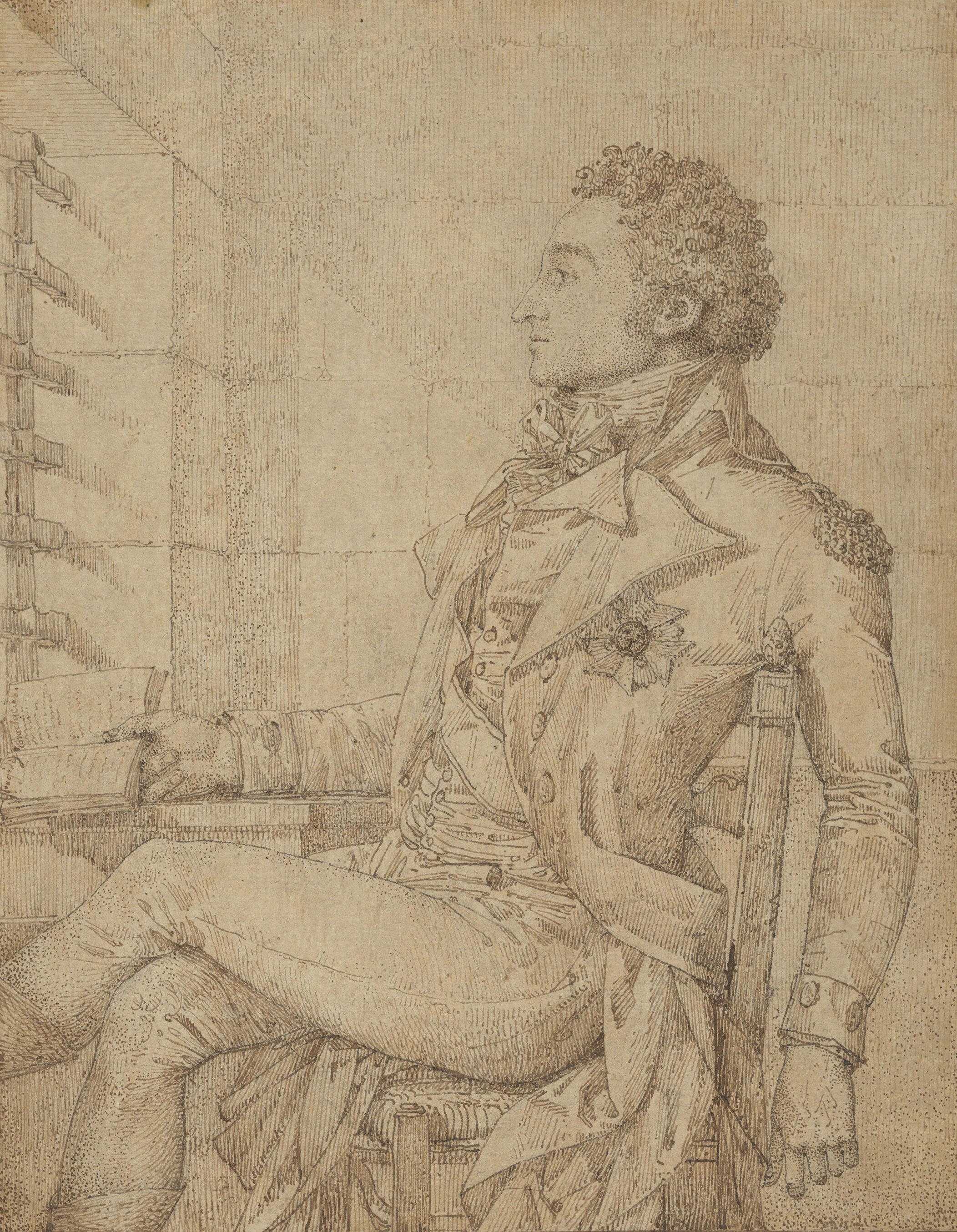
1796 portrait of Smith by Philippe-Auguste Hennequin

Lángara ordered Don Pedro Cotiella to take three boats into the arsenal to destroy the French fleet, and the recently arrived Sir Sidney Smith volunteered to accompany him with his ship Swallow and three British boats. The flotilla was augmented by the fireships HMS Vulcan and San Luis Gonzago. Cotiella was tasked with sinking Toulon's powder hulks, one a disarmed former British frigate captured during the American Revolutionary War, Montréal, and the other the frigate Iris. These ships contained the gunpowder stores for the entire fleet and due to the danger of explosion were anchored in the outer roads, some distance from the city. He was then instructed to enter the Old Arsenal and destroy the ships there. Smith's boats approached the dock gates, which had been barred against attack and manned by 800 former galley slaves freed during the retreat whose sympathies were with the advancing Republicans. To ensure that they did not interfere, Smith kept his boat's guns trained on them throughout the operation. Dockyard workers, rapidly abandoning Royalist insignia, also attempted to block Smith's operation but were successfully locked out of the Arsenal. In addition, Smith's boats had been spotted by the Republican batteries on the heights and cannonballs and shells rained into the arsenal, although none struck Smith's men. As darkness fell Republican troops reached the shoreline and contributed musketry to the fusillade, Smith replying with grape shot from his boat's guns.

At 20:00 Captain Charles Hare brought Vulcan into the New Arsenal, Smith halting the ship across the row of anchored French ships of the line. The fuses were lit at 22:00, although Hare was badly wounded by an early detonation as he attempted to leave the ship. Simultaneously, fire parties set alight to the warehouses and stores ashore, including the mast house and the hemp and timber stores, creating a blazing inferno across the harbour as Vulcan's cannons fired a last salvo at the French positions on the shore. With the fires spreading through the dockyards and New Arsenal Smith began to withdraw, his force illuminated by the flames as an inviting target for the Republican batteries. As his boats passed the Iris however the powder ship suddenly and unexpectedly exploded, blasting debris in a wide circle and sinking two of the British boats. On Britannia all of the crew miraculously survived, but on Union the master and three men were killed.

With the New Arsenal in flames, Smith realised that the Old Arsenal appeared intact, only a few small fires marking the inefficient Spanish efforts at destroying the French ships anchored within. He immediately led Swallow back towards the arsenal but found that Republican soldiers had captured it intact, their heavy musketry driving him back. The gun batteries defending the Arsenal, reported sabotaged by French Royalist troops, had been taken intact and opened a heavy fire on the boat parties. Instead he turned to two disarmed ships of the line, Héros and Thémistocle, which lay in the inner roads as prison hulks. The French Republican prisoners on board had initially resisted British efforts to burn the ships, but with the evidence of the destruction in the arsenal before them they consented to be safely conveyed to shore as Smith's men set the empty hulls on fire. The nearby frigate Courageuse was also set on fire, but it failed to spread and the ship survived.

Once the British and Spanish boat parties had departed, the galley slaves opened the dockyard gates, allowing dock workers and Republican troops to enter the Arsenal. Forming improvised fire-fighting teams, these men worked to extinguish the blaze, saving a number of burning ships, moving unburnt ships away from the inferno and putting-out fires in the grain store, rope house and gun store among other shore installations.

=== Evacuation ===
With all available targets now on fire or in French hands, Smith withdrew once more, accompanied by dozens of small watercraft packed with Toulonnais refugees and Neapolitan soldiers separated during the retreat. As he passed the second powder hulk, Montréal, it too unexpectedly exploded. Although his force was well within the blast radius, on this occasion none of Smith's men were struck by falling debris and his boats were able to retire to the waiting British fleet without further incident. As Smith's boats had gone about their work Hood had ordered HMS Robust under Elphinstone and HMS Leviathan under Captain Benjamin Hallowell to evacuate the allied troops from the waterfront. The allied troops embarked in good order, protected by the rearguard of Sardinian soldiers under Major George Koehler and fire from the frigate HMS Romulus.

They were joined by HMS Courageux under Captain William Waldegrave, which was undergoing repairs in the Arsenal to replace a damaged rudder. Despite this handicap, Courageux was able to participate in the evacuation and warp out of the harbour with the replacement rudder following behind suspended between two ship's boats. The fireship HMS Conflagration, also undergoing repairs, was unable to sail and was destroyed during the evacuation. By the morning of 19 December Elphinstone's squadron had retrieved all of the Allied soldiers from the city without losing a single man.

In addition to the soldiery, the British squadron and their boats took on board thousands of French Royalist refugees, who had flocked to the waterfront when it became clear that the city would fall to the Republicans; as many as 20,000 thronged the waterfront in search of a vessel. Among the evacuees was Trogoff and other senior French leaders of the garrison. Robust, the last to leave, carried more than 3,000 civilians from the harbour and another 4,000 were recorded on board Princess Royal out in the roads. In total the British fleet reported rescuing 14,877 Toulonnais from the city; witnesses on board the retreating ships reported scenes of panic on the waterfront as stampeding civilians were crushed or drowned in their haste to escape the advancing Republican soldiers, who fired indiscriminately into the fleeing populace. A host of small craft carried refugees out of the harbour to the waiting British ships or safe harbours in Italy or Spain. Hundreds drowned. Modern historian Bernard Ireland estimates that the actual number of civilians evacuated was approximately 7,000.

== Aftermath ==
In the aftermath of the fall of Toulon, Deputies Moyse Bayle and Louis-Marie Stanislas Fréron conducted a campaign of ideological terror against the population, executing an estimated 6,000 civilians and recruiting an army of 12,000 masons from across Southern France to destroy much of the city as punishment for the rebellion. The damage done to the French fleet were extensive, although by no means as comprehensive as might have been achieved had the Spanish boat parties fulfilled their orders: not one of the eight ships of the line in the Old Arsenal had been more than lightly damaged by the fires, while on shore, although many small warehouses and stores had been burnt, the grand magazine had escaped destruction and was seized intact by the Republicans. The only targets the Spanish parties had successfully destroyed were the powder hulks Iris and Montréal, both of which had been unexpectedly blown up, rather than sunk as instructed. Moreover, the two separate explosions each occurred just as Sir Sidney Smith's British boats passed by the hulks, the first blast swamping two boats and killing three men. British historian William Laird Clowes noted wryly that "the excitement and danger of the situation seem to have proved too much for the Spaniards", later accusing them directly of "jealousy and treachery". Smith himself was less condemnatory, praising Cotiella and his men for their "zeal and activity", and historian Noel Mostert considered that the failure of the Allies to draw up contingency plans, urged but not acted on by Lángara as early as 3 October, was the principal factor in the failure to eliminate the entire Fcorench fleet.

Smith's parties had been much more successful than their Spanish counterparts, the burning Vulcan contributing to the total destruction of six ships of the line in the New Arsenal and damaging five more. His boarding parties also seized and destroyed the prison ships Héros and Thémistocle without unnecessary loss of life and caused considerable damage to shore installations. Among the material destroyed on shore was the fleet's timber stores, a blow which the English historian Nicholas A. M. Rodger described as "the single most crippling blow suffered by the French Navy since Quiberon Bay" in 1759. Smith was entrusted with Hood's dispatches and on his return to Britain given command of his own frigate, but despite his actions an opportunity to permanently cripple French power in the Mediterranean had been lost, a fact for which some contemporaries blamed Smith. Smith's Oxford Dictionary of National Biography entry notes however that "The British had indeed missed an unprecedented opportunity to weaken French naval power. However, Smith was only partly to blame: more advance planning and preparation might have avoided last-minute delegation to one who was regarded as a maverick volunteer." Among the 15 French ships of the line which survived the last days of the siege were eight ships that would fight at the Battle of the Nile in 1798.

The Royalist ships which participated in the withdrawal were subsequently seized by the Allies. One frigate, Alceste, was gifted to the Royal Sardinian Navy in appreciation of their contribution, but was recaptured by the French six months later. The Spanish Navy took possession of the corvette Petite Aurore, and the rest were taken into the Royal Navy. Of the large prizes, only Pompée went on to see full service, fighting at the First Battle of Algeciras in 1801. Puissant spent the remainder of the war on harbour duties and the huge Commerce de Marseille, although described as "the most beautiful ship that had hitherto been seen" proved to be wildly unstable when employed in the Atlantic and she too spent the rest of her career in port. Of the captured frigates only Aréthuse, Perle and Topaze were considered to be valuable acquisitions, the others only deployed on local service in the Mediterranean.

During 1794, as the French fleet underwent repairs in Republican Toulon, the British Mediterranean fleet concerned itself with the invasion of Corsica, particularly the sieges of Bastia and Calvi. In March 1795 the French fleet again put to sea suffering a minor defeat at the Battle of Genoa and another in July at the Battle of Hyères Islands. These engagements marked the only encounters between the British fleet and the French fleet they so briefly held before the Royal Navy was forced to withdraw from the Mediterranean by the 1796 Treaty of San Ildefonso at which the Spanish changed sides, allying with France against Britain.

== French fleet ==
The ships in the orders of battle below are listed by class and then approximately grouped by their positions on 18 December 1793. Note that although the Rating system for ships of the line was a Royal Navy measure, it has been included below for comparative purposes.

- Ships in this colour were seized on 17 December
- Ships in this colour were destroyed beyond repair on 18 December

French Mediterranean fleet
Ship	Rate	Guns	Notes
Commerce de Marseille	First rate	118	Removed from Toulon by French Royalists, 18 December. Seized by the Royal Navy and commissioned as HMS Commerce de Marseille.
Pompée	Third rate	74	Removed from Toulon by French Royalists, 18 December. Seized by the Royal Navy and commissioned as HMS Pompée.
Puissant	Third rate	74	Removed from Toulon by French Royalists, 18 December. Seized by the Royal Navy and commissioned as HMS Puissant.
Scipion	Third rate	74	Removed from Toulon by French Royalists in October. Subsequently destroyed by a fire at Leghorn, 26 November.
Apollon	Third rate	74	Sent to Lorient as a cartel, 14 September.
Entreprenant	Third rate	74	Sent to Brest as a cartel, 14 September.
Orion	Third rate	74	Sent to Rochefort as a cartel, 14 September.
Patriote	Third rate	74	Sent to Brest as a cartel, 14 September.
Dauphin Royal	First rate	118	Under refit, anchored in the Old Arsenal. Survived undamaged.
Tonnant	Third rate	80	Ready for sea, anchored in the Old Arsenal. Damaged on 18 December, subsequently repaired.
Couronne	Third rate	80	Under repair, anchored in the Old Arsenal. Damaged on 18 December, subsequently repaired.
Languedoc	Third rate	80	Under refit, anchored in the Old Arsenal. Survived undamaged.
Généreux	Third rate	74	Ready for sea, anchored in the Old Arsenal. Survived undamaged.
Alcide	Third rate	74	Under repair, anchored in the Old Arsenal. Survived undamaged.
Censeur	Third rate	74	Under repair, anchored in the Old Arsenal. Survived undamaged.
Conquérant	Third rate	74	Under repair, anchored in the Old Arsenal. Damaged on 18 December, subsequently repaired.
Triomphant	Third rate	80	Under refit, anchored in the New Arsenal. Destroyed on 18 December.
Centaure	Third rate	74	Ready for sea, anchored in the New Arsenal. Destroyed on 18 December.
Commerce de Bordeaux	Third rate	74	Ready for sea, anchored in the New Arsenal. Damaged on 18 December, subsequently repaired.
Destin	Third rate	74	Ready for sea, anchored in the New Arsenal. Destroyed on 18 December.
Duguay-Trouin	Third rate	74	Ready for sea, anchored in the New Arsenal. Destroyed on 18 December.
Heureux	Third rate	74	Ready for sea, anchored in the New Arsenal. Damaged on 18 December, subsequently repaired.
Tricolore	Third rate	74	Ready for sea, anchored in the New Arsenal. Destroyed on 18 December.
Suffisant	Third rate	74	Under refit, anchored in the New Arsenal. Destroyed on 18 December.
Liberté	Third rate	74	Under repair, anchored in the New Arsenal. Damaged on 18 December, subsequently repaired.
Guerrier	Third rate	74	Under repair, anchored in the New Arsenal. Survived undamaged.
Mercure	Third rate	74	Under repair, anchored in the New Arsenal. Damaged on 18 December, subsequently repaired.
Souverain	Third rate	74	Under repair, anchored in the New Arsenal. Survived undamaged.
Héros	Third rate	74	In service as a prison hulk. Anchored in the inner roads. Destroyed on 18 December.
Thémistocle	Third rate	74	In service as a prison hulk. Anchored in the inner roads. Destroyed on 18 December.
Barra	Third rate	74	Under construction in the dockyard, Damaged on 18 December, subsequently repaired and completed.
Frigates
Aréthuse	Frigate	40	Removed from Toulon, later commissioned into the Royal Navy as HMS Undaunted.
Perle	Frigate	40	Removed from Toulon, later commissioned into the Royal Navy as HMS Amethyst.
Alceste	Frigate	36	Removed from Toulon, given to the Royal Sardinian Navy.
Topaze	Frigate	36	Removed from Toulon, later commissioned into the Royal Navy as HMS Topaze.
Lutine	Frigate	32	Removed from Toulon, later commissioned into the Royal Navy as HMS Lutine.
Aurore	Frigate	36	Removed from Toulon, later commissioned into the Royal Navy as HMS Aurore.
Sérieuse	Frigate	36	Ready for sea. Damaged on 18 December, subsequently repaired.
Iphigénie	Frigate	32	Ready for sea, anchored in the New Arsenal. Damaged on 18 December, subsequently repaired.
Boudeuse	Frigate	32	In poor condition, anchored in the Old Arsenal. Survived undamaged.
Courageuse	Frigate	36	Ready for sea, anchored in the inner roads. Survived undamaged.
Montréal	Frigate	32	Disarmed powder hulk, anchored in the outer roads. Destroyed by a Spanish boarding party on 18 December
Iris	Frigate	32	Disarmed powder hulk, anchored in the outer roads. Destroyed by a Spanish boarding party on 18 December
Minerve	Frigate	40	Under construction in the dockyard, Damaged on 18 December, subsequently repaired and completed.
Smaller warships
Poulette	Corvette	26	Removed from Toulon, later commissioned into the Royal Navy as HMS Poulette.
Prosélyte	Corvette	24	Removed from Toulon, later commissioned into the Royal Navy as HMS Proselyte.
Bellete	Corvette	24	Removed from Toulon, later commissioned into the Royal Navy as HMS Bellette.
Caroline	Corvette	20	Ready for sea, anchored in the New Arsenal. Destroyed on 18 December.
Auguste	Corvette	20	Ready for sea, anchored in the New Arsenal. Destroyed on 18 December.
Sincere	Corvette	20	Removed from Toulon, later commissioned into the Royal Navy as HMS Sincere.
Mulet	Corvette	20	Removed from Toulon, later commissioned into the Royal Navy as HMS Mulette.
Mozelle	Corvette	20	Removed from Toulon, later commissioned into the Royal Navy as HMS Moselle.
Pluvier	Corvette	20	Sent to Bordeaux as a cartel, 14 September.
Bretonne	Corvette	18	In poor condition, anchored in the New Arsenal. Survived undamaged
Petit Aurore	Corvette	18	Removed from Toulon, commissioned into the Spanish Navy.
Alerte	Brig	16	Ready for sea, anchored in the Old Arsenal. Damaged on 18 December, subsequently repaired.
Tarleton	Brig	14	Removed from Toulon, later commissioned into the Royal Navy as HMS Tarleton.
Sources: James, Vol.1, pp. 66–84; Clowes, p. 552; Gardiner, p. 102, Tracy, pp. 36–60, "No. 13613". The London Gazette. 17 January 1794. p. 42.
