= Pierre-Marie-Louis de Boisgelin de Kerdu =

Monsieur Pierre Marie Louis de Boisgelin de Kerdu
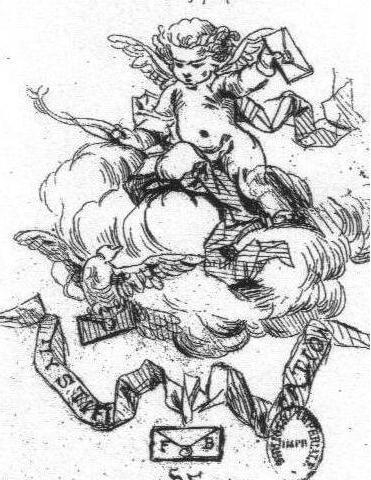
- El librisy by Caillot-Duval
- Born: 5 May 1758; Plélo, Brittany, Kingdom of France
- Died: 9 September 1816 (aged 58); Pleubian, Côtes-d'Armor, Kingdom of France
- Military career
- Allegiance: Kingdom of France; French Emigres
- Branch: Armée Royale; Armée des Émigrés
- Service years: 1784–1795
- Rank: Major
- Units: Régiment du Roi; Régiment Royal Louis
- Conflicts: Siege of Toulon
- Awards: Knight of the Order (1782–1793)

Pierre-Marie-Louis de Boisgelin de Kerdu (5 May 1758 – 9 September 1816) was a French nobleman known for his works as a member of the Knights of Malta and later as an officer of the émigré unit, Régiment Royal Louis.

== Biography ==
Pierre-Marie-Louis Kerdu was born on 5 May 1758 at the Château of Ville-Balin in Plélo, Brittany to Claude Jean Marie, Comte de Boisgelin and Jeanne Ammanuelle du Hallay de la Borderie. Pierre studied at the Saint-Sulpice seminary and later presented to the Order of Saint John of Jerusalem on 8 August 1782. In 1784 he was commissioned into the French Royal Army as a Sous-lieutenant in the Régiment du Roi (King's Regiment), where he developed a close friendship with the Comte de Plies, Duc de Fortia. The two became so close they began using the pseudonym of 'Caillot-Duval' for their letters.

In 1788, Pierre was promoted to Lieutenant, but left France that year to travel Central Europe and Russia. In 1793, following the French Revolution, Pierre abandoned the Knights, but remained in Malta.

In London, Pierre published his best known book, Ancient and Modern Malta, containing a description of the ports of the islands of Malta and Gozo in 1804. In 1809, he published a further three-volume article on the Knights, entitled "Ancient and Modern Malta, containing the description of the island... the history of the Knights of Saint John of Jerusalem until the year 1800 and the account of the events which accompanied the entry of the French into Malta and its conquest by the English".

In 1815, following the Bourbon Restoration, Pierre returned to France but was never able to obtain a pension from the new king for himself or any soldiers of the Régiment Royal Louis. On 9 September 1816, Pierre died at the age of 58.

== Siege of Toulon ==
In 1793, he traveled to Toulon, which had just given itself up to the British as a result of the Federalist revolts. Soon after, through a secret agreement with Louis Stanislas Xavier, Comte de Provence, he organised the Régiment Royal Louis, the only regiment in the name of King Louis XVII. Soon after, he became Captain of the Grenadier Company (Compagnie des Grenadiers). After the death of Major Hustin during the Siege of Toulon, he became commanding officer of said regiment until its disbandment in December 1794; and subsequently he retired. Because the regiment had been under his command for the majority of its duration, it is sometimes referred to as the Régiment de Boisgelin.
