= Joseph Marie Dessaix =

French general (1764–1834)

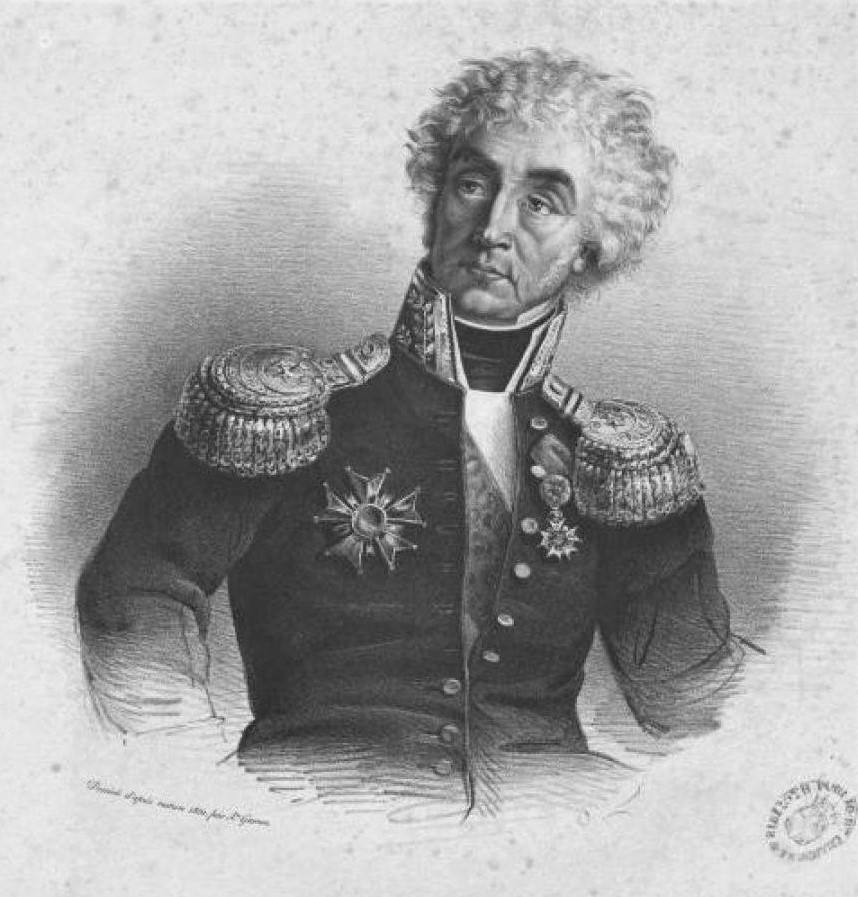
Joseph Marie Dessaix

Joseph Marie, comte Dessaix (24 September 1764, Thonon-les-Bains, Haute-Savoie – 26 October 1834) was a French general of the Napoleonic Wars.

== Career ==
He was born at Thonon in Savoy. He studied medicine, took his degree at Turin, and then went to Paris, where in 1789 he joined the National Guard. In 1791 he tried without success to begin an uprising in Savoy, in 1792 he organized the Légion des Allobroges, and in the following years he served at the siege of Toulon, in the Army of the Eastern Pyrenees, and in the Army of Italy. He was captured at Rivoli, but was soon exchanged.

In the spring of 1798 Dessaix was elected a member of the Council of Five Hundred. He was one of the few in that body who opposed the coup d'etat of the 18th Brumaire (November 9, 1799). In 1803 he was promoted general of brigade, and soon afterwards Commander of the Légion d'honneur. He distinguished himself greatly at the battle of Wagram (1809), and was about this time promoted general of division and named Grand Officer of the Légion d'honneur, and in 1810 was made a count. He took part in Napoleon's invasion of Russia, leading the 4th division of the I Corps (Grande Armée) under Davout, and was twice wounded. For several months he was commandant of Berlin, and afterwards delivered the department of Mont Blanc from the Austrians. After the first restoration Dessaix held a command under the Bourbons.

He joined Napoleon in the Hundred Days and was appointed to command the 23rd Division in Marshal Louis Gabriel Suchet's corps on the Savoy frontier. His division included two battalions each of the 42nd and 53rd Line Infantry Regiments under General of Brigade Jean Revest and three battalions of the 67th Line under General of Brigade Jean Montfalcon.

In 1816 he was imprisoned for five months. The rest of his life was spent in retirement.
DESSAIX, J. is one of the names inscribed under the Arc de Triomphe, on Column 1.
