= Siege of Toulon (1793) =

1793 siege of the War of the First Coalition

- Part of the Mediterranean campaign of 1793–1796 and Federalist revolts
- 1842 painting of the siege
Date	29 August – 19 December 1793
Location	Toulon, France 43.13°N 5.92°E
Result	French Republican victory

Belligerents
France	French Royalists; French Federalists; Great Britain; Spain; Naples; Sardinia

Commanders and leaders
(French First Republic) Napoleon Bonaparte (WIA) (French First Republic) Dugommier (French First Republic) Jean Carteaux (French First Republic) Jean de La Poype	(Kingdom of Great Britain) Samuel Hood (Kingdom of Great Britain) Charles O'Hara (surrendered) (Kingdom of Great Britain) Sidney Smith (Kingdom of Great Britain) Henry Phipps (Kingdom of Great Britain) David Dundas (Spain) Juan de Lángara (Spain) Federico Gravina

Strength
32,000	1,500 (Kingdom of Great Britain) 8,000 and 37 ships (Spain) 7,000 and 32 ships (Kingdom of Naples) (Kingdom of Sicily) (Kingdom of Sardinia) 6,500 and 5 ships Total: 22,000–23,000 men 74 ships (Note: See also § Order of battle for the strength of the Coalition army and fleet.)

Casualties and losses
1,700 killed or wounded	1,500 captured (Kingdom of Great Britain) 700 killed or wounded (Spain) 1,200 killed or wounded (Kingdom of Naples) (Kingdom of Sardinia) 200 killed or wounded (Kingdom of Naples) (Kingdom of Sardinia) 1,000 captured Total: 4,600
- Location within Europe

War of the First Coalition:
Napoleon Bonaparte
current battle
Napoleon as commander
Napoleon as commander in chief

The Siege of Toulon took place during the War of the First Coalition. Following the insurrection of 31 May – 2 June 1793, a Federalist revolt against the French First Republic broke out in the city of Toulon, France. The Federalists were soon supplanted by more numerous French Royalists, aided by the First Coalition, which sent forces to help them hold the city. An Anglo-Spanish fleet arrived on 28 August transporting 13,000 British, Spanish, Neapolitan and Sardinian troops. As Toulon was strategically vital, being a major naval port which was then host to a third of the French Navy's ships of the line, the French Republican government quickly moved to recapture the city.

French Republican troops soon arrived in the area around Toulon and began laying siege to the city. The defenders constructed several forts around Toulon to defend the city from Republican attacks, but these were eventually captured by the besiegers, who constructed several artillery batteries to bombard Toulon. This made the position of the defenders untenable, and a council of senior defending officers agreed to evacuate the city on 18 December. During the evacuation, British and Spanish forces burnt or captured several French warships, temporarily crippling much of the French Navy. Republican troops entered Toulon on 19 December and summarily executed up to 800 Royalist prisoners. One of the Republican commanders at the siege, Napoleon Bonaparte, would go on to enjoy a prodigious military career and eventually become Emperor of the French.

== Background ==
After the arrest of the Girondist deputies on 2 June 1793, there followed a series of insurrections within the French cities of Lyon, Avignon, Nîmes, and Marseille known as Federalist revolts. In Toulon, the Federalists evicted the local chapter of the Jacobins, but were soon supplanted by more numerous French Royalists. Upon the announcement of the French Republic's recapture of Marseille and the Republican reprisals committed there, the commander of the Royalist forces in Toulon, Xavier Lebret d'Imbert, requested support from the First Coalition. On 28 August, a combined Anglo-Spanish fleet under British Admiral Sir Samuel Hood and Spanish Admiral Juan de Lángara arrived at Toulon transporting 13,000 British, Spanish, Neapolitan and Sardinian troops. D'Imbert delivered the port of Toulon to the Allies. Reinforcement ships arrived gradually: the allied forces participating in repelling the French siege included an army, marines, and local French oppositionists.

Toulon hoisted the royal flag, the fleur de lys, and d'Imbert declared the eight-year-old Louis XVII the king of France on 1 October. This result produced a potentially mortal situation for the French Republic, as the city had a key naval arsenal and was the base for 26 ships of the line (about one-third of the French Navy's total). Without this port, the French could not hope to challenge the Allies, and specifically the British, for command of the sea. In addition, Toulon's loss would send a dangerous signal to others preparing to revolt against the Republic. Although France had a large army due to its levée en masse, the Republic could not easily rebuild its navy, which had been the third largest in Europe, if the Allies, Royalists and Federalists destroyed or captured much of it. Both the strategic importance of the naval base and the prestige of the Revolution demanded that the French recapture Toulon.

== Siege ==
Napoleon leading the attack on Little Gibraltar on 17 December

I have no words to describe Buonaparte's merit: much technical skill, an equal degree of intelligence, and too much gallantry ...

— General Jacques François Dugommier, at the siege of Toulon, in a letter to Minister of War Jean Bouchotte

The troops of the army said to be of the "Carmagnoles", under the command of General Jean François Carteaux, arrived at Toulon on 8 September, after those troops had recovered Avignon and Marseille, and then Ollioules. They joined up with the 6,000 men of the Alpine Maritime Army, commanded by General Jean François Cornu de La Poype, who had just taken La Valette-du-Var, and sought to take the forts of Mont Faron, which dominated the city to the East. They were reinforced by 3,000 sailors under the orders of Admiral Jean René César de Saint-Julien de Chabon, who refused to join his defecting superior, Jean-Honoré de Trogoff de Kerlessy. A further 5,000 soldiers under General La Poype were attached to the army to retake Toulon from the Army of Italy.

The Chief of Artillery, Elzéar Auguste Cousin de Dommartin, having been wounded at Ollioules, had the young captain Napoleon Bonaparte imposed upon him by the special representatives of the National Convention and Bonaparte's friends—Augustin Robespierre and Antoine Christophe Saliceti. Bonaparte had been in the area escorting a convoy of powder wagons en route to Nice and had stopped in to pay his respects to his fellow Corsican, Saliceti. Bonaparte had been present in the army since the Avignon insurrection (July 1793), and was imposed on Dommartin in this way despite the antipathy between the two men.

Despite the mutual dislike, Bonaparte was able to muster an artillery force that was sufficient for a siege of Toulon and the fortresses that were quickly built by the British in its immediate environs. He was able to requisition equipment and cannon from the surrounding area. Guns were taken from Marseille, Avignon and the Army of Italy. The local populace, which was eager to prove its loyalty to the republic which it had recently rebelled against, was blackmailed into supplying the besieging force with animals and supplies. His activity resulted in the acquisition of 100 guns for the force. With the help of his friends, the deputies Saliceti and Augustin Robespierre, who held power of life and death, he was able to compel retired artillery officers from the area to re-enlist. The problem of manning the guns was not remedied by this solution alone, and under Bonaparte's intensive training he instructed much of the infantry in the practice of employing, deploying and firing the artillery that his efforts had recently acquired. However, in spite of this effort, Bonaparte was not as confident about this operation as was later his custom. The officers serving with him in the siege were incompetent, and he was becoming concerned about the needless delays due to these officers' mistakes. He was so concerned that he wrote a letter of appeal to the Committee of Public Safety requesting assistance. To deal with his superiors who were wanting in skill, he proposed the appointment of a general for command of the artillery, succeeding himself, so that "... [they could] command respect and deal with a crowd of fools on the staff with whom one has constantly to argue and lay down the law in order to overcome their prejudices and make them take steps which theory and practice alike have shown to be axiomatic to any trained officer of this corps".

After some reconnaissance, Bonaparte conceived a plan which envisaged the capture of the forts of l'Éguillette and Balaguier on the hill of Cairo (French: colline du Caire), which would then prevent passage between the small and large harbours of the port, so cutting maritime resupply, necessary for those under siege. Carteaux, reluctant, sent only a weak detachment under Major General Henri François Delaborde, which failed in its attempted conquest on 22 September. The allies, now alerted, built Fort Mulgrave, named in honour of the British commander, Henry Phipps, 1st Earl of Mulgrave, on the summit of the hill. It was supported by three smaller ones, called Saint-Phillipe, Saint-Côme, and Saint-Charles. The apparently impregnable assemblage was nicknamed by the French "Little Gibraltar".

Bonaparte was dissatisfied by the sole battery—called the "Mountain", positioned on the height of Saint-Laurent since 19 September. He established another, on the shore of Brégallion, called the "sans-culottes". Hood attempted to silence it, without success, but the British fleet was obliged to harden its resolve along the coast anew, because of the high seabed of Mourillon and la Tour Royale. On the first of October, after the failure of General La Poype against the "Eastern Fort" of Faron, Bonaparte was asked to bombard the large fort of Malbousquet, whose fall would be required to enable the capture of the city. He therefore requisitioned artillery from all of the surrounding countryside, holding the power of fifty batteries of six cannon apiece. Promoted to Chief of Battalion on 19 October, he organised a grand battery, said to be "of the Convention", on the hill of Arènes and facing the fort, supported by those of the "Camp of the Republicans" on the hill of Dumonceau, by those of the "Farinière" on the hill of Gaux, and those of the "Poudrière" at Lagoubran.

On 11 November, Carteaux was dismissed and replaced by François Amédée Doppet, formerly a doctor, whose panic upon witnessing the death of his aide-de-camp beside him would cause an attempted attack against Fort Mulgrave on the 15th to fail. On the 17th, he was succeeded by General Jacques François Dugommier, who immediately recognised the virtue of Bonaparte's plan, and prepared for the capture of Little Gibraltar. On the 20th, as soon as he arrived, the battery "Jacobin" was established, on the ridge of l'Evescat. Then, on the left, on 28 November, the battery of the "Men Without Fear", and then on 14 December, the "Chasse Coquins" were constructed between the two. Two other batteries were organised to repel the eventual intervention of the allied ships, they were called "The Great Harbour" and the "Four Windmills".

Pressured by the bombardment, the Anglo-Neapolitans executed a sortie, and took hold of the battery of the "Convention". A counter-attack, headed by Dugommier and Bonaparte, pushed them back and the British General Charles O'Hara was captured. He initiated surrender negotiations with Robespierre the Younger and Antoine Louis Albitte and the Federalist and Royalist battalions were disarmed.

Following O'Hara's capture, Dugommier, La Poype, and Bonaparte (now a colonel) launched a general assault during the night of 16 December. Around midnight, the assault began on Little Gibraltar and the fighting continued all night. Bonaparte was injured in the thigh by a British sergeant with a bayonet. However, in the morning, the position having been taken, Marmont was able to place artillery there, against l'Eguillette and Balaguier, which the British had evacuated without confrontation on the same day. During this time, La Poype finally was able to take the forts of Faron and Malbousquet. The allies then decided to evacuate by their maritime route. Commodore Sydney Smith was instructed by Hood to have the delivery fleet and the arsenal burnt.

== Destruction of the French fleet ==
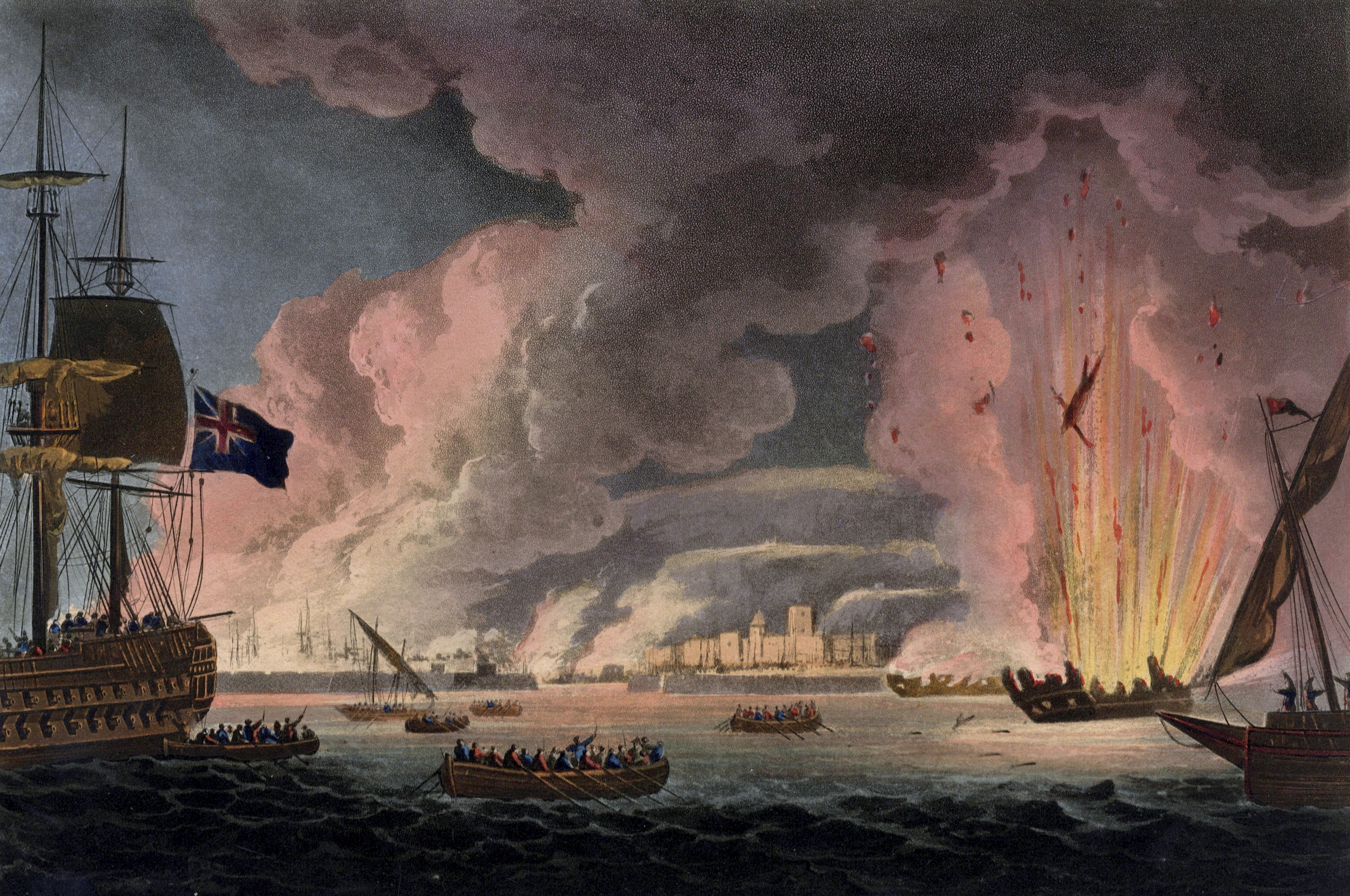
Illustration of the destruction of the French fleet at Toulon

Lángara ordered Don Pedro Cotiella to take three ships into the arsenal to destroy the French fleet. Sir Sidney Smith, who had recently arrived, volunteered to accompany him with his ship Swallow and three British ships. Cotiella was tasked with sinking Toulon's hulks; one was a disarmed former British frigate captured during the American Revolutionary War, Montréal, and the other was the French frigate Iris. These ships contained the gunpowder stores for the entire fleet and due to the danger of explosion were anchored in the outer roads, some distance from the city. He was then instructed to enter the Old Arsenal and destroy the ships there. The dock gates had been barred against attack and manned by 800 former galley slaves freed during the retreat. Their sympathies were with the advancing Republicans so to ensure that they did not interfere, Smith kept his guns trained on them throughout the operation. His boats were spotted by the Republican batteries on the heights and cannonballs and shells landed in the arsenal, although none struck Smith's men. As darkness fell Republican troops reached the shoreline and contributed musketry to the fusillade; Smith replied with grapeshot from his boats' guns.

At 20:00 Captain Charles Hare brought the fire ship HMS Vulcan into the New Arsenal. Smith halted the ship across the row of anchored French ships of the line, and lit the fuses at 22:00. Hare was badly wounded by an early detonation as he attempted to leave his ship. Simultaneously, fire parties set alight the warehouses and stores ashore, including the mast house and the hemp and timber stores, creating an inferno across the harbour as Vulcan's cannons fired a last salvo at the French positions on the shore. With the fires spreading through the dockyards and New Arsenal, Smith began to withdraw. His force was illuminated by the flames, making an inviting target for the Republican batteries. As his boats passed the Iris, however, the powder ship suddenly and unexpectedly exploded, blasting debris in a wide circle and sinking two of the British boats. On Britannia all of the crew survived, but the blast killed the master and three men on Union.

With the New Arsenal in flames, Smith realised that the Old Arsenal appeared intact; only a few small fires marked the Spanish effort to destroy the French ships anchored within. He immediately led Swallow back towards the arsenal but found that Republican soldiers had captured it intact, their heavy musketry driving him back. Instead he turned to two disarmed ships of the line, Héros and Thémistocle, which lay in the inner roads as prison hulks. The French Republican prisoners on board had initially resisted British efforts to burn the ships, but with the evidence of the destruction in the arsenal before them they consented to be safely conveyed to shore as Smith's men set the empty hulls on fire.

=== Evacuation ===
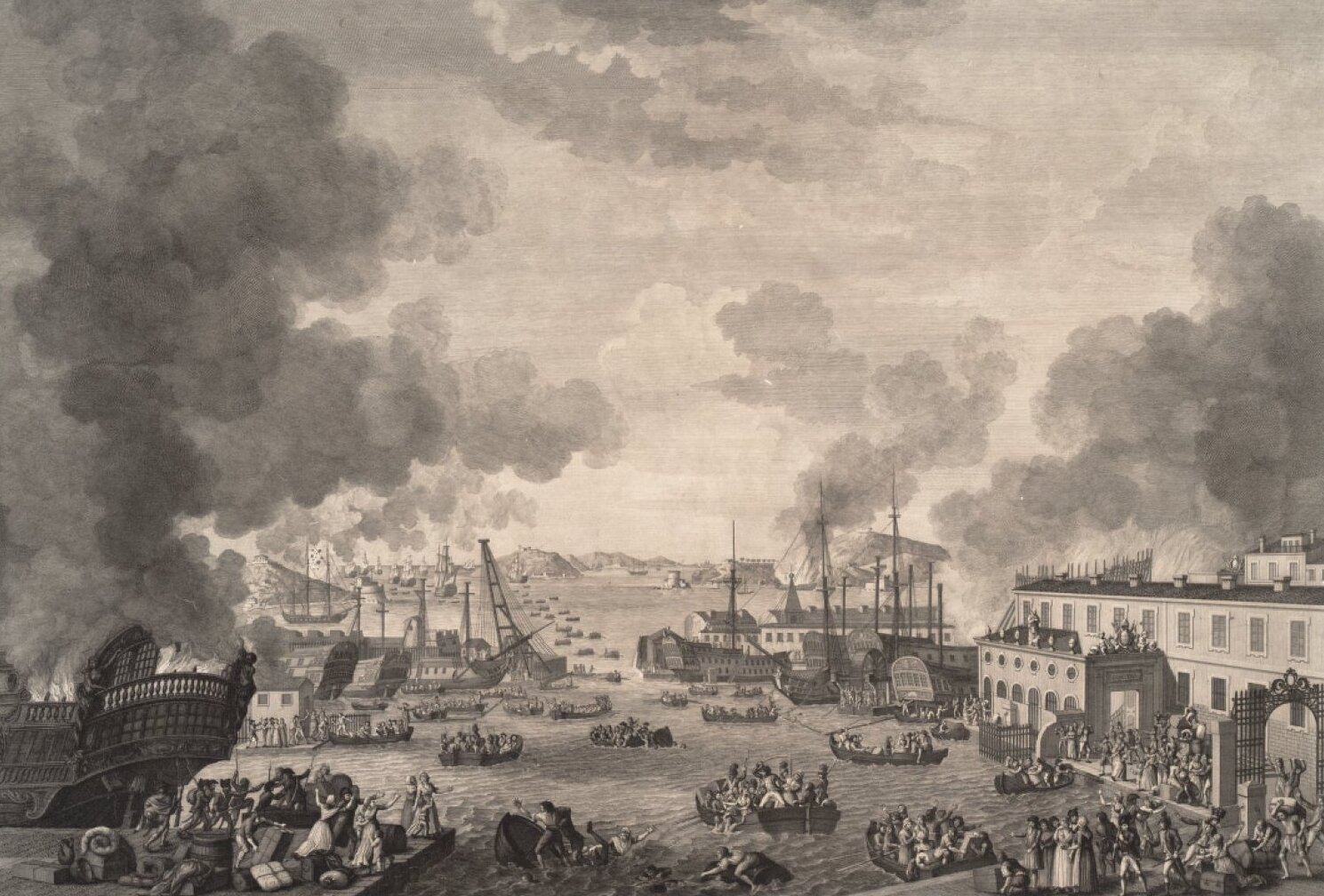
Illustration of the evacuation of Toulon

With all the available targets on fire or in French hands, Smith withdrew once more, accompanied by dozens of small watercraft packed with Toulonnais refugees and Neapolitan soldiers separated during the retreat. As he passed the second powder hulk, Montréal, she also exploded unexpectedly. Although his force was well within the blast radius, on this occasion none of Smith's men were struck by falling debris and his boats retired to the waiting British fleet without further incident. As Smith's boats had gone about their work Hood had ordered HMS Robust under Captain George Elphinstone and HMS Leviathan under Captain Benjamin Hallowell to evacuate the allied troops from the waterfront. They were joined by HMS Courageux under Captain William Waldegrave, which had been undergoing repairs in the Arsenal to replace a damaged rudder. Despite this handicap, Courageux was able to participate in the evacuation and warp out of the harbour with the replacement rudder following behind, suspended between two ship's boats. The fireship HMS Conflagration, also undergoing repairs, was unable to sail and was destroyed during the evacuation. By the morning of 19 December Elphinstone's squadron had retrieved all of the Allied soldiers from the city without losing a single man.

In addition to the soldiery, the British squadron and their boats took on board thousands of French Royalist refugees, who had flocked to the waterfront when it became clear that the city would fall to the Republicans. Robust, the last to leave, carried more than 3,000 civilians from the harbour and another 4,000 were recorded on board Princess Royal out in the roads. In total the British fleet rescued 14,877 Toulonnais from the city; witnesses on board the retreating ships reported scenes of panic on the waterfront as stampeding civilians were crushed or drowned in their haste to escape the advancing Republican soldiers, who fired indiscriminately into the fleeing populace.

== Aftermath ==
=== Suppression ===
The troops of the Convention entered the city on the 19 December. The subsequent suppression of Royalists, directed by Paul Barras and Stanislas Fréron, was extremely bloody. It is estimated that between 700 and 800 prisoners were shot or slain by bayonet on Toulon's Champ de Mars. Bonaparte, treated for his injuries by Jean François Hernandez, was not present at the massacre. Promoted to brigade general on 22 December, he was already on his way to his new post in Nice as the artillery commander for the Army of Italy. A gate, which comprises part of the old walls of the city of Toulon, evokes his departure; a commemorative plaque has been affixed there. This gate is called the Porte d'Italie. As a punishment, the Convention changed the name of the city to Port-la-Montagne, after The Mountain faction.

== Order of battle ==
Below is the full order of battle of forces involved. Because no centralised command existed for the allies, they are simply designated as the 'Allied Army', however this was neither a field formation, nor a coherent force. The order of battle below is shown for the last part of the siege (from September).

=== French Republicans ===
French Republicans Order of Battle

By the end of the siege, Republican strength totalled from 8 x Regular Infantry Battalions, 50 x Volunteer Infantry Battalions, and 9 x National Guard Battalions, plus about 30 x Company-sized detachments. The Republicans eventually amassed some 1,600 x artillerymen and well over 100 x artillery pieces. The gunners were mixed themselves, with 42% Volunteers, 33% Regulars, and 25% Naval Gunners. Note: the 'Divisions' located below were administrative formations, and by no means operational formations. Each unit below has its English name following by its local-language name (in parentheses), followed by [if available] the amount of troops.

- French Army, commanded by Division General Jacques François Dugommier
  - at Ollioules
    - Company, 9th Dragoon Regiment (Lorraine) (Compagnie du 9ème Régiment de Dragons (Lorraine)) (51)
    - 27 x Mounted Gendarmerie
  - Artillery
    - 4 x Naval Artillery Companies (411)
    - Côte d'Or Volunteer Artillery Company (Compagnie d'Artillerie Volontaire de la Côte d'Or) (18)
    - Lozère Volunteer Artillery Company (Compagnie d'Artillerie Volontaire de la Lozère) (19)
    - 2 x Infantry Artillery Battalions (545)
    - 2 x Volunteer Artillery Battalions (663)
  - Division of the West (17,000 by end of September) – detached from the Army of the Alps
    - Right Wing
      - 5th Grenadier Battalion (5ème Bataillon de Grenadiers) (488)
      - 1 x Battalion, 23rd Line Infantry Regiment (23ème Régiment d'Infanterie de Ligne) (587)
      - 1st Battalion, Ardèche Volunteers (1ère Bataillon des Volontaires des l'Ardèche) (501)
      - 1st Battalion, Gard Volunteers (1ère Bataillon des Volontaires du Gard) (683)
      - 5th Battalion, Hautes-Alpes Volunteers (5ème Bataillon des Volontaires des Hautes-Alpes) (538)
      - Battalion of the Mountain (Bataillon de la Montagne) (497)
      - 1 x Chasseur Company, Allobroges Legion (Légion de Allobroges) (Note: A unique legion, comprising 14 x Chasseur Companies, 3 x Dragoon troops, and an artillery battery. Totalling by itself some 1,129 troops.) (153)
      - Le Ponnet's Brigade, commanded by Brigade General Le Ponnet
        - 2nd Chasseur Company, Allobroges Legion (2ème Compagnie des Chasseurs du Légion de Allobroges) (153)
        - 2nd Company, 2nd Battalion, Basses Alpes Volunteers (2ème Compagnie du 2ème Bataillon des Volontaires des Basses Alpes) (69)
        - 5th Company, 2nd Battalion, Côte d'Or Volunteers (5ème Compagnie du 2ème Bataillon des Volontaires de la Côte d'Or) (95)
        - 3rd Company, 3rd Battalion, Basses Alpes Volunteers (3ème Compagnie du 3ème Bataillon des Volontaires des Basses Alpes) (94)
        - 5th Company, 3rd Battalion, Basses Alpes Volunteers (5ème Compagnie du 3ème Bataillon des Volontaires des Basses Alpes) (89)
        - 6th Company, 3rd Battalion, Basses Alpes Volunteers (5ème Compagnie du 3ème Bataillon des Volontaires des Basses Alpes) (77)
        - 8th Company, 3rd Battalion, Basses Alpes Volunteers (8ème Compagnie du 3ème Bataillon des Volontaires des Basses Alpes) (79)
        - Company of Basset (Compagnie du Basset) (41)
      - in La Seyne-sur-Mer
        - 1st Battalion, Drôme Volunteers (1ère Bataillon des Volontaires de la Drôme) (622)
        - 2nd Battalion, Côte d'Or Volunteers (2ème Bataillon des Volontaires de la Côte d'Or) (870)
        - 4th Battalion, Aix-en-Provence Volunteers (4ème Bataillon des Volontaires d'Aix) (288)
        - 4th Battalion, Haute-Garonne Volunteers (4ème Bataillon des Volontaires de l'Haute-Garonne) (699)
        - 5th Battalion, Haute-Garonne Volunteers (5ème Bataillon des Volontaires de l'Haute-Garrone) (812)
        - Grenadier Company, 6th Battalion, Marseille Volunteers (Compagnie de Grenadiers du 6ème Bataillon des Volontaires de Marseille) (143)
        - Chasseur Company, 6th Battalion, Marseille Volunteers (Compagnie de Chasseurs du 6ème Bataillon des Volontaires de Marseille) (52)
        - 1 x Chasseur Company, Allobroges Legion (Légion de Allobroges) (160)
    - Centre Column
      - 9th Battalion, Drôme Volunteers (9ème Bataillon de la Dôme) (640)
    - Left Wing
      - 1st Battalion, 59th Line Infantry Regiment (1ère Bataillon du 59ème Régiment d'Infanterie de Ligne) (694)
      - 1st Battalion, Carpentras Volunteers (1ère Bataillon des Volontaires de Carpentras) (599)
      - 2nd Battalion, Bouches du Rhône Volunteers (2ème Bataillon des Volontaires des Bouches du Rhône) (345)
      - 3rd Battalion, Mont Blanc Volunteers (3ème Bataillon des Volontaires du Mont Blanc) (607)
      - 5th Battalion, Vaucluse Volunteers (5ème Bataillon des Volontaires de Vaucluse) (819)
      - 6th Battalion, Gironde Volunteers (6ème Bataillon des Volontaires de la Gironde) (718)
      - 6th Battalion, Mountain Volunteers (6ème Bataillon des Volontaires de la Montagne) (452)
      - 8th Battalion, Isère Volunteers (8ème Bataillon des Volontaires de l'Isère) (693)
      - 12th Battalion, Drôme Volunteers (12ème Bataillon des Volontaires de la Drôme) (703)
      - 1/2 Battalion, Aubagne Volunteer Battalion (Bataillon des Volontaires d'Aubagne) (271)
      - Grenadier Company, 4th Battalion, Mountain Volunteers (Compagnie de Grenadiers du 4ème Bataillon des Volontaires de la Montagne) (36)
      - Grenadier Company, 4th Battalion, Vaucluse Volunteers (Compagnie de Grenadiers du 4ème Bataillon des Volontaires de Vaucluse) (54)
      - 3rd Free Company of Marseille (Compagnie Franche de Marseille) (80)
      - 1 x Company, 2nd Battalion, Ardèche Volunteers (2ème Bataillon des Volontaires de l'Ardèche) (74)
      - 1 x Company, Arles Volunteer Battalion (Bataillon des Volontaires des Arles) (108)
      - 1 x Chasseur Company, Allobroges Legion (Légion de Allobroges) (69)
      - 1 x Company, Basses Alpes Chasseurs (Chasseurs des Basses Alpes) (72)
      - 1/2 Company, Luberon Grenadiers (Grenadiers de Luberon) (33)
      - 1/2 Company, Seine Free Company (Compagnie Franche de la Seine) (55)
      - 1/2 Company, Drôme Free Company (Compagnie Franche de la Drôme) (56)
      - 1/2 Company, Saint-Esprit Chasseurs (Chasseurs de Saint Esprit) (30)
      - in Le Bandol
        - 1st Company, 3rd Battalion, Basses Alpes Volunteers (1ère Compagnie du 3ème Bataillon des Volontaires des Basses Alpes) (92)
        - 1st Company, 5th Battalion, Basses Alpes Volunteers (1ère Compagnie du 5ème Bataillon des Volontaires des Basses Alpes) (82)
        - 1st Company, Bandol National Guard (1ère Compagnie du Garde Nationale de Bandol) (79)
      - in Saint Nazaire
        - Saint Nazaire National Guard (Garde Nationale de Saint Saint Nazaire) – 1 battalion
        - 1/2 Company, 59th Line Infantry Regiment (59ème Régiment d'Infanterie de Ligne) (33)
        - 1/2 Company, Aubagne Volunteer Battalion (Bataillon des Volontaires d'Aubagne) (21)
  - Division of the East, commanded by Division General Jean François Cornu de La Poype (18,530 troops) – detached from the Army of Italy
    - 15th Dragoon Regiment (Noailles) (15ème Régiment de Dragons (Noailles)) (196)
    - 23 x Chasseurs à Cheval
    - 21 x Mounted Guides
    - 25 x Mounted Gendarmerie
    - Allobroges Legion (Légion de Allobroges) (436)
    - Grenadiers of Bouches-du-Rhône (Grenadiers des Bouches-du-Rhône) (485)
    - 1st Battalion, 10th Line Infantry Regiment (1ère Bataillon du 10ème Régiment d'Infanterie de Ligne) (648)
    - 1st Battalion, 28th Line Infantry Regiment (1ère Bataillon du 28ème Régiment d'Infanterie de Ligne) (371)
    - 1st Battalion, 35th Line Infantry Regiment (1ère Bataillon du 35ème Régiment d'Infanterie de Ligne)
    - 2nd Battalion, 35th Line Infantry Regiment (2ème Bataillon du 35ème Régiment d'Infanterie de Ligne)
    - 2nd Battalion, 59th Line Infantry Regiment (2ème Bataillon du 59éme Régiment d'Infanterie de Ligne) (631)
    - 2nd Battalion, Montblanc National Guard (2ème Bataillon de la Garde Nationale de Montblanc) (417)
    - 1st Battalion, Apt Volunteers (1ère Bataillon des Volontaires d'Apt) (616)
    - 1st Battalion, Barjols Volunteers (1ère Bataillon des Volontaires Barjols) (595)
    - 1st Battalion, Marseille Volunteers (1ère Bataillon des Volontaires de Marseille) (372)
    - 2nd Battalion, Ardèche Volunteers (2ème Bataillon des Volontaires de l'Ardèche) (962)
    - 2nd Battalion, Aveyron Volunteers (2ème Bataillon des Volontaires d'Aveyron) (617)
    - 2nd Battalion, Brignoles Volunteers (2ème Bataillon des Volontaires de Brignoles) (595)
    - 2nd Battalion, Luberon Volunteers (2ème Bataillon des Volontaires du Luberon) (320)
    - 2nd Battalion, Vaucluse Volunteers (2ème Bataillon des Volontaires du Vaucluse) (449)
    - 3rd Battalion, Isère Volunteers (3ème Bataillon des Volontaires de l'Isère) (678)
    - 4th Battalion, Ardèche Volunteers (4ème Bataillon des Volontaires de l'Ardèche) (752)
    - 4th Battalion, Hérault Volunteers (4ème Bataillon des Volontaires de l'Hérault) (618)
    - 4th Battalion, Isère Volunteers (4ème Bataillon des Volontaires de l'Isère) (527)
    - 4th Battalion, Vaucluse Volunteers (4ème Bataillon des Volontaires du Vaucluse) (334)
    - 5th Battalion, Bec d'Ambès Volunteers (5ème Bataillon des Volontaires de Bec d'Ambès) (431)
    - 7th Battalion, Côtes Maritimes Volunteers (7ème Bataillon des Volontaires des Côtes-Maritimes) (925)
    - 7th Battalion, Var Volunteers (7ème Bataillon des Volontaires du Var) (486)
    - 10th Battalion, Drôme Volunteers (10ème Bataillon des Volontaires de la Drôme) (509)
    - 14th Battalion, Drôme Volunteers (14ème Bataillon des Volontaires de la Drôme) (778)
    - Battalion of Bausset (Bataillon du Bausset) (306)
    - Battalion of Landes (Bataillon des Landes) (485)
    - Chasseurs of Ariège (Chasseurs de l'Arriège) (306)
    - 1st Battalion, Sans Culottes Volunteers (1ère Bataillon des Sans Culottes) (494)
    - 2nd Battalion, Sans Culottes Volunteers (2ème Bataillon des Sans Culottes) (639)
    - 4th Battalion, Marseille Mountain Volunteers (4ème Bataillon des Volontaires Montagne de Marseille) (367)
    - 5th Battalion, Aix-en-Provence Mountain Volunteers (5ème Bataillon des Volontaires Montagne d'Aix) (399)
    - 5th Battalion, Marseille Mountain Volunteers (5ème Bataillon des Volontaires Montagne de Marseille) (296)
    - Battalion of the Union (Bataillon de l'Union) (426)
    - Chasseurs of the Revolution (Chasseurs de la Revolution) (388)
    - 1/2 Battalion, Chasseurs of Saint-Hilaire (Chasseurs de Saint-Hilaire) (272)
    - Free Company of Saint Nazaire (Compagnie Franche de Sainte Nazaire) (39)
    - Free Company of Ciotat (Compagnie Franche de la Ciotat) (59)
    - 5th Free Company (5ème Compagnie Franche) (54)
    - Company of Luc (Compagnie du Luc) (67)
    - 1 x Company, Battalion of Cotignac (Bataillon de Cotignac) (82)
    - Company of Jacobins (Compagnie des Jacobins) (48)
    - 1 x Company of Pioneers (64)

=== Allied Army ===
Allied Army Order of Battle
- Allied Forces (total 22,000), commanded by Major General David Dundas after O'Hara's capture
  - French Forces (total 1,200 troops on 29 August)
    - Armée des Émigrés (French Royalists)
      - Royal Louis Regiment (Régiment Royal Louis) – formed in British pay from 7 September
      - 2 x Companies, Corsican Chasseurs (Chasseurs Corses)
      - Independent Company of Royal French Marine Artillery (Compagnie Indépendante d'Artillerie Marine Royale Français) – formed during the siege from Royalist gunners of the Naval and Army artillery
    - Federalists (French Anti-Montagne forces)
      - 1st Battalion, Toulon National Guard (1ère Bataillon de la Garde Nationale de Toulon)
      - 2nd Battalion, Toulon National Guard (2ème Bataillon de la Garde Nationale de Toulon)
      - 3rd Battalion, Toulon National Guard (3ème Bataillon de la Garde Nationale de Toulon)
      - 4th Battalion, Toulon National Guard (4ème Bataillon de la Garde Nationale)
  - British Forces (8,000 troops) (Note: All one battalion strength unless noted)
    - 2nd Battalion, 1st (Royal) Regiment of Foot
    - 11th Regiment of Foot
    - 18th (The Royal Irish) Regiment of Foot
    - 25th (Edinburgh) Regiment of Foot
    - 30th Regiment of Foot
    - 69th Regiment of Foot
    - Detachments of His Majesty's Marine Forces from the British squadron
    - 1 x Artillery Company (from Gibraltar), commanded by Major Keohler
  - Neapolitan Troops (6,500 troops), commanded by General Pignatelli (Note: Standard organisation is two battalions unless stated.)
    - King's Infantry Regiment (Reggimento di Fanteria del Re)
    - Borgogna Infantry Regiment (Reggimento Fanteria Borgogna)
    - 1st Battalion, Messapia Infantry Regiment (1° Battaglione, Reggimento Fanteria Messapiapia)
    - 2nd Battalion, Royal Naples Infantry Regiment (2° Battaglione, Reggimento Fanteria Reale Napoli)
    - 2 x Companies, Royal Macedonia Infantry Regiment (Reggimento di Fanteria della Macedonia Reale)
  - Sardinian/Piedmontese Troops (2,000 troops), commanded by General Bueler
    - Piedmont Infantry Regiment
    - de Courten Infantry Regiment (Swiss)
    - 4th Battalion, Royal Grenadier Regiment
    - 1st Hunters Battalion of Breglio (1° Battaglione Cacciatori di Breglio)
  - Spanish Troops, commanded by Admiral Federico Carlos Gravina y Nápoli (4,000 troops)
    - Córdoba Infantry Regiment
    - Hibernia Infantry Regiment (Irish)
    - Málaga Infantry Regiment
    - Mallorca Infantry Regiment
    - Betschart Infantry Regiment (Swiss)
    - 1 x Battalion, Chinchilla de Montearagón Provincial Infantry Regiment
    - 1 x Battalion, Mallorca Provincial Infantry Regiment
    - 1 x Battalion, Spanish Marine Infantry

=== Allied Fleet ===
Allied Fleet Order of Battle
- Allied Fleet, commanded by Vice-Admiral Lord Hood
  - British Squadron, commanded by Vice Admiral Lord Hood

Ship	Guns	Commander	Ref.
HMS Victory	100	Vice-Admiral Lord Hood; Rear-Admiral Sir Hyde Parker; Captain John Knight	
HMS Britannia	100	Vice-Admiral William Hotham; Captain John Holloway	
HMS Windsor Castle	98	Vice-Admiral Phillips Cosby; Captain Sir Thomas Byard	
HMS Princess Royal	98	Rear-Admiral Samuel Goodall; Captain John Child Purvis	
HMS St George	98	Rear-Admiral John Gell; Captain Thomas Foley	
HMS Alcide	74	Commodore Robert Linzee; Captain John Woodley	
HMS Terrible	74	Captain Skeffington Lutwidge	
HMS Egmont	74	Captain Archibald Dickson	
HMS Robust	74	Captain George Elphinstone	
HMS Courageux	74	Captain William Waldegrave	
HMS Bedford	74	Captain Robert Man	
HMS Berwick	74	Captain Sir John Collins	
HMS Captain	74	Captain Samuel Reeve	
HMS Fortitude	74	Captain William Young	
HMS Leviathan	74	Captain Lord Hugh Seymour	
HMS Colossus	74	Captain Charles Pole	
HMS Illustrious	74	Captain Thomas Frederick	
HMS Ardent	64	Captain Robert Manners Sutton	
HMS Diadem	64	Captain Andrew Sutherland	
HMS Intrepid	64	Captain Charles Carpenter	
HMS Agamemnon	64	Captain Horatio Nelson	
HMS St Albans	64	Captain James Vashon	
HMS Romney	50	Captain William Paget	
HMS Aigle	36	Captain John Nicholson Inglefield	
HMS Inconstant	36	Captain Augustus Montgomery	
HMS Leda	36	Captain George Campbell	
HMS Romulus	36	Captain John Sutton	
HMS Isis	32	Captain George Lumsdaine	
HMS Juno	32	Captain Samuel Hood	
HMS Aimable	32	Captain Sir Harry Burrard	
HMS Lowestoft	32	Captain William Wolseley	
HMS Meleager	32	Captain Charles Tyler	
HMS Mermaid	32	Captain John Trigge	
HMS Aquilon	32	Captain Robert Stopford	
HMS Castor	32	Captain Thomas Troubridge	
HMS Dido	28	Captain Sir Charles Hamilton	
HMS Nemesis	28	Captain Lord Amelius Beauclerk	
HMS Tartar	28	Captain Thomas Fremantle	
HMS Amphitrite	24	Captain Anthony Hunt	
HMS Bulldog	14	Commander George Johnstone Hope	
HMS Dolphin	44	Commander James May	
HMS Gorgon	44	Commander Charles William Patterson	
HMS Camel	20	Commander Benjamin Hallowell	
HMS Fury	14	Commander Frank Sotheron	
HMS Weazel	12	Commander William Taylor	
HMS Speedy	14	Commander Charles Cunningham	
HMS Scout	14	Commander Joseph Hanwell	
HMS Eclair	20	Commander George Henry Towry	
HMS Tisiphone	12	Commander Thomas Byam Martin	
HMS Conflagration	14	Commander Edward Browne	
HMS Vulcan	14	Commander John Matthews	

- French Royalist-Federalist Squadron, commanded by Counter-admiral Jean-Honoré de Trogoff de Kerlessy
  - Commerce de Marseille (118), commanded by de Kerlessy
  - Pompée (74)
  - Puissant (74)
  - Perle (40)
- Spanish Squadron, commanded by Admiral Juan de Lángara
  - Purísima Concepción (112), commanded by Lángara
  - Mexicano (112)
  - 8 x 74-gun ships of the line
- Neapolitan Squadron
  - 2 x 74-gun ships of the line

== See also ==
- Military career of Napoleon

== Notes and citations ==
Notes

Citations

Preceded by Battle of Peyrestortes	French Revolution: Revolutionary campaigns Siege of Toulon (1793)	Succeeded by First Battle of Wissembourg (1793)
