= Régiment Royal-Louis =

French émigré unit

Royal Louis Regiment
- Régiment Royal-Louis
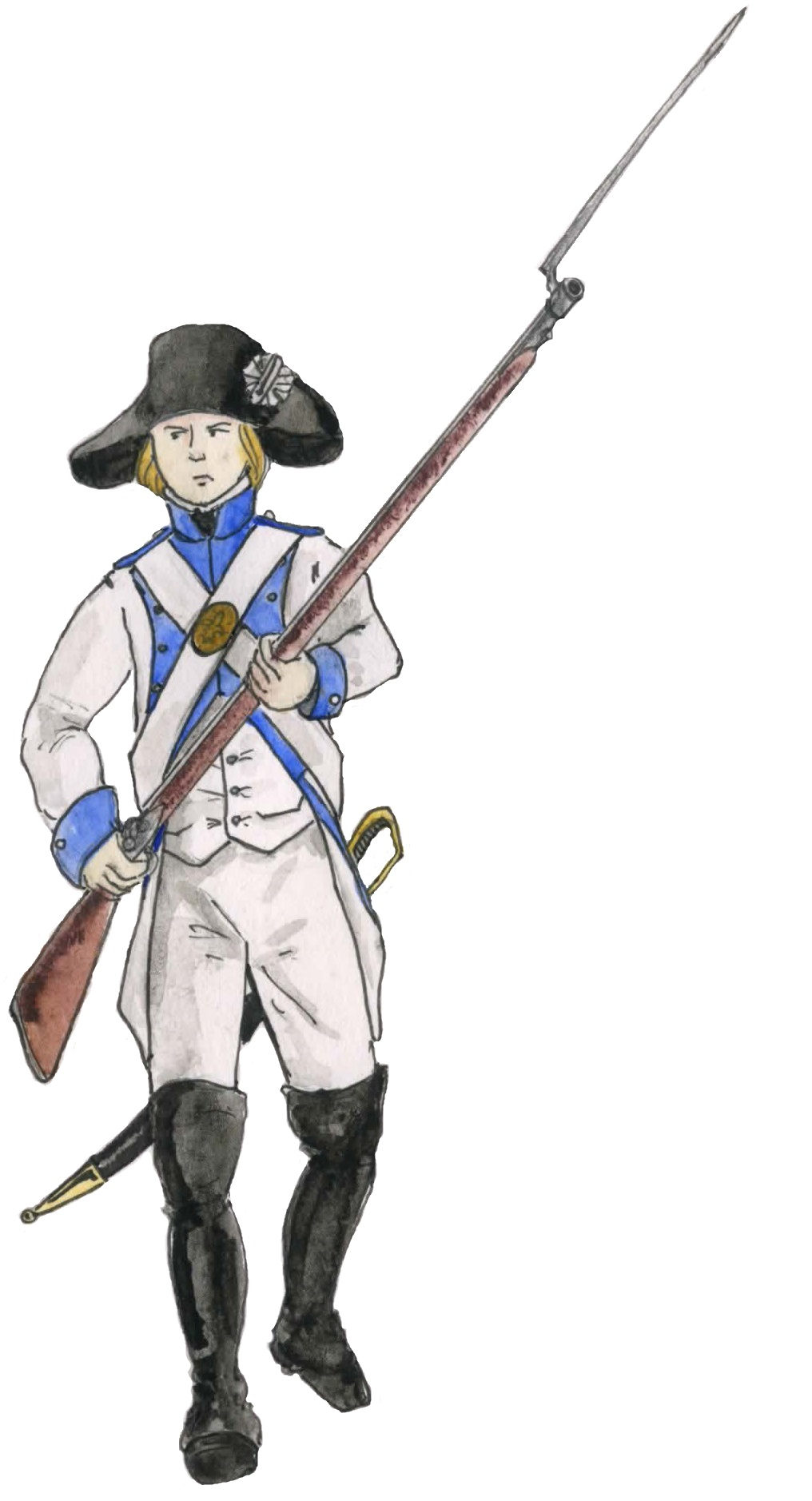
- A regimental private
- Active: October 1793 – December 1794
- Allegiance: Louis XVII
- Branch: Armée des Émigrés
- Type: Line infantry
- Size: One battalion
- Engagements: French Revolutionary War; Siege of Toulon; Invasion of Corsica

Commanders
- Notable commanders: Major Hustin; Pierre-Marie-Louis de Boisgelin de Kerdu

The Régiment Royal-Louis (English: Literally: Regiment Royal Louis, Anglicised: Royal Louis Regiment) was a line infantry regiment of the Armée des Émigrés, the counter-revolutionary forces loyal to the so-called King of France Louis XVII. Raised in Toulon, the regiment would be thrown into the siege of that city immediately, and quickly became battle hardened. After the evacuation from Toulon, part of the regiment would be involved in the invasion of Corsica, but disbanded in December 1794 following a reorganisation of the émigré troops.

== Formation ==
In 1793, the French Revolution and its ideas were being spread throughout southern France. However, with the beginning of the Reign of Terror, anyone accused of anti-revolutionary sentiments was murdered. In southern France especially, many pro-revolution supporters began to oppose the tyrannical and inhuman behaviour of The Mountain, the left-wing radical party controlling France since the Insurrection of 31 May – 2 June. The subsequent takeover and complete control of Maximilien Robespierre led to country-wide Federalist revolts. At the strategically important arsenal in Toulon, Provence, the entirety of the Toulon National Guard revolted and handed over their area to British. The allies arrived, and in late August 1793, the Siege of Toulon started, and with no end in sight, Allied support for the city grew, and several local units began to form.

One of the new regiments to be raised during the siege was the Régiment Royal-Louis "in the name and for the service of Louis XVII". The new regiment was placed in British pay, effectively making it a British unit on 7 September 1793. Officers were commissioned in the name of King Louis XVII. The regiment used French drills and the old French disciplinary system, and was initially composed of four fusilier companies of 75 rank and file apiece, but eventually included a Grenadier Company added in November and a sixth company of fusiliers before the evacuation.

Military historian, C. T. Atkinson describes the Royal Louis Regiment as "... the finest and most genuinely Royalist corps" formed at Toulon.

== Siege of Toulon ==
The siege of Toulon, which the regiment fought in

By 12 October 1793, the regiment had recruited 395 all ranks and had already seen action in a counterattack against the besieging Republicans on 1 October. Here the regiment lost several officers and 40 men resisting, with part of the 30th (Cambridgeshire) Regiment of Foot, a heavy Republican attack which eventually captured an outwork. During the siege, the town's civilians were asked to join the fight on the Allies' side. Though fiercely anti-Republican, many did not comply. However, the new Royal Louis regiment was noted as fighting on well on several occasions, notably in defending a battery near Cap Brun on 15 October, when it had over 90 casualties but fought with "determined valour".

At Cap Brun, 300 men of the regiment were attached to the post therein and were attacked in great force. Reinforcements, including the rest of the Royal Louis regiment and 100 men of the 30th Regiment of Foot were hurried to their help under Captain George Elphinstone of the Royal Navy. They arrived just in time to find the Royal Louis still holding gallantly on, though their ammunition was nearly exhausted and their outposts had been driven in. The counterattack was successful, though later on, the enemy resumed the attack in greater force and eventually drove the defenders back. In the words of General David Dundas, the regiment "showed determined valour", though it lost 5 officers and nearly 500 men.

Another 30 were lost in an abortive sortie on 29–30 October, and on 14 December, some 77 men out of 300 were killed or wounded defending Fort Mulgrave. The losses were a result of an over-impetuous pursuit of a beaten enemy.

The regiment's first commanding officer was Major Hustin, who died early in 1794 after distinguishing himself at Toulon. His successor was the commander of the Grenadier Company, Pierre-Marie-Louis de Boisgelin, by whose name the regiment is sometimes described. De Boisgelin had emigrated to Malta, but later arrived in Toulon with Admiral Hood's squadron.

General Dundas, in describing the closing stages of the defence, speaks very favourably of the regiment and of the two independent Chasseur companies, who also left Toulon with the Allies, but the 600 men, all that they amounted between them, were not a big contribution from so large a city as Toulon.

Though an émigré unit, the regiment was held in high esteem by the British for its excellent conduct; it was also the last unit evacuated from Toulon, leaving behind over 100 men, including 80 wounded covering the last evacuees.

== Corsica and disbandment ==
After the evacuation, the regiment was scattered: about 100 officers and men were aboard ships which were sent straight back to England, 90 were serving as marines in one of Admiral Hood's ships of the line in June 1794, while another 300 went with Admiral Hood and General Dundas to Corsica and took part in the invasion of the island. At the same time, some troops sailed on board the French ships Pompée and Puissant, which were dispatched back to England. Those troops embarked with Admiral Hood's Squadron were embarked mostly on HMS Terrible from 25 December 1793 to 30 July 1794.

Between May–August 1794, part of the regiment was engaged in the fighting in Corsica, which led to the establishment of the Anglo-Corsican Kingdom. At the Siege of Calvi, the regiment inflicted heavy casualties on the Republicans which led to the fall of the local Republican forces.

Meanwhile, in London, Great Britain, Secretary of State for War Henry Dundas, 1st Viscount Melville, felt the regiment should be incorporated into new émigré regiments formed in England. In June 1794, orders were given to concentrate the regiment in England for incorporation into the Régiment de Hervilly's white cockade regiment.

General Sir Gilbert Elliot, 4th Baronet, tried vainly to countermand the decision. Regardless, in November, the regiment arrived at Portsmouth Naval Base, Hampshire, about 475 strong, and was incorporated into the Régiment de Hervilly on 12 December 1794.

== Uniform ==
The regimental uniform was as follows: white coat, blue collars, cuffs and lapels, white turnbacks with blue fleur-de-lis, while shoulder straps edged blue, brass buttons stamped with three fleur-de-lis and '1'; white waistcoat and breeches, black bicorne with white cockade and cockade loop. The regiment was armed with the Charleville M1777 infantry musket with white accoutrements. Grenadiers had a bearskin cap with a brass plate stamped with fleur-de-lis, white cords and red plume, red fringed epaulettes, red (flaming grenade turnback ornaments). Drummers wore French Royal livery: blue coat with red facings, a white chain on crimson livery lace. The uniform was of French Royal Army style, cut according to 1791 regulations: non-commissioned officers had French rank distinctions while officers had gold buttons and epaulettes.

Following the regiment's incorporation into the Hervilly regiment, a new scarlet red uniform was issued, though the royal blue facings remained in honour of the old unit.
