= Légion des Allobroges =

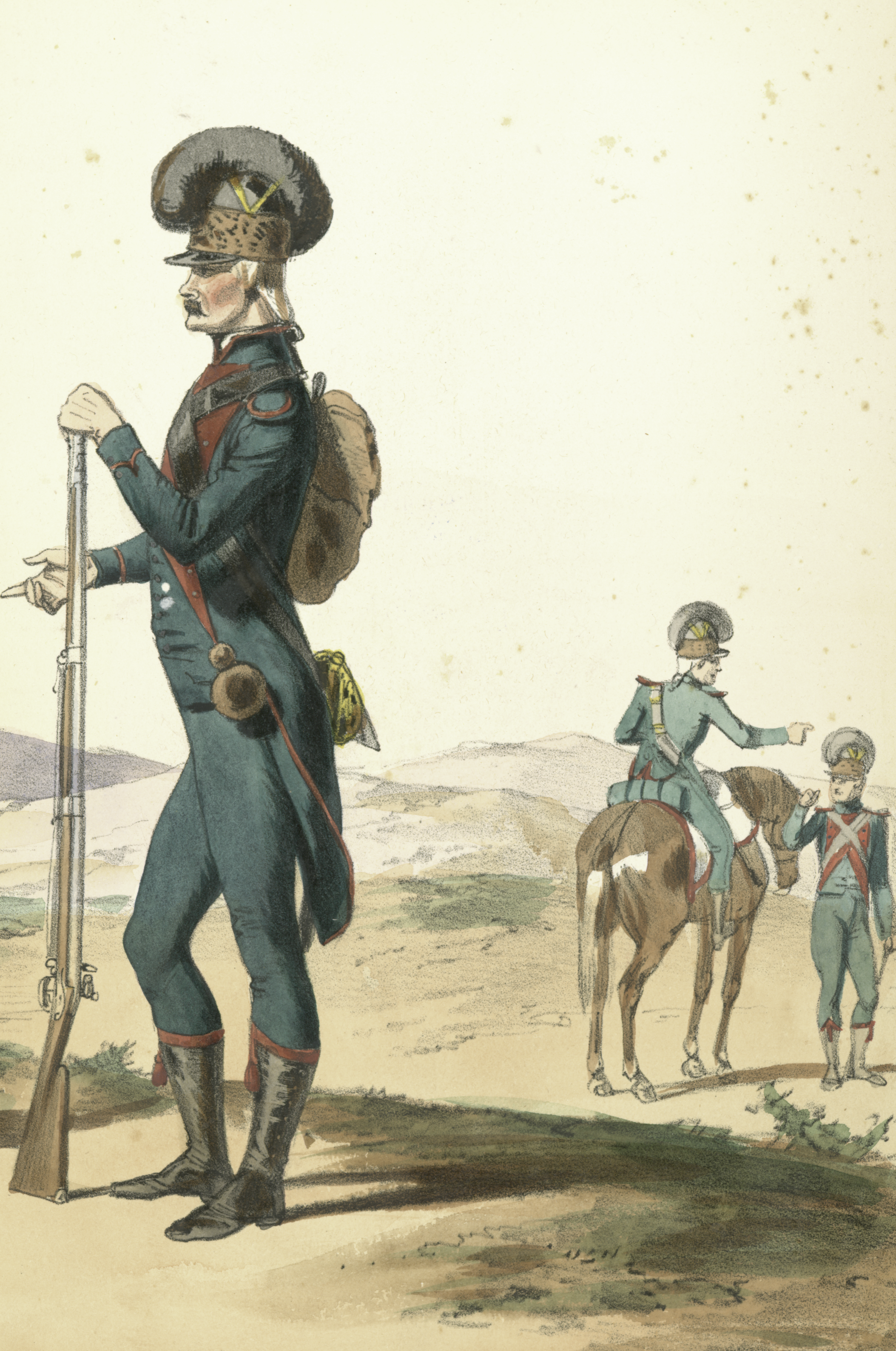
Uniforms of the Légion des Allobroges

The Légion des Allobroges was a unit of the French Revolutionary Army that consisted mainly of volunteers from Switzerland, Piedmont and Savoy.

The Legion's name refers to the Allobroges, a Gallic tribe in Roman times. Reviving Roman names and concepts was a common practice of the French Revolution.

== History ==
Created by Joseph Marie Dessaix in 1792, it was at first part of the Army of the Midi commanded by the Marquis de Montesquiou that invaded Savoy. Later the legion took part in the siege of Toulon in 1793 and fought against the Spanish in the War of the Pyrenees in 1794-5. In 1796 it was transferred to the Army of Italy where it was badly mauled at the Battle of Rivoli. Later the legion became part of the 4th Infantry demi-brigade and then of the 27th Infantry demi-brigade.

== Reputation ==
The legion had a reputation for extreme ferocity, with some reports claiming that its soldiers used the ears of killed enemies as hat decorations.

== Sources ==
- Crowdy, T. French Revolutionary Infantry 1789-1802. Osprey, 2004. ISBN 1-84176-660-7
- Ireland, B. The Fall of Toulon: The Last Opportunity to Defeat the French Revolution. Weidenfeld & Nicolson, 2005. ISBN 0-297-84612-4
