= Minerve-class frigate =

French Navy ship class, built 1782-1794

Class overview
- Name: Minerve
- Builders: Toulon
- Operators: French Navy; Royal Navy
- Preceded by: Nymphe class
- Succeeded by: Seine class
- Planned: 6
- Completed: 6

General characteristics
- Type: Frigate
- Displacement: 1330 tonneaux
- Tons burthen: 700 port tonneaux
- Sail plan: Ship-rigged
- Armament: Minerve (1782); UD: 26 × 18-pounder long guns; SD: 10-14 × 8-pounder long guns; Minerve (1794) (Originally); UD: 28 × 18-pounder long guns; SD: 12 × 8-pounder guns + 2 × 36-pounder obusiers; Minerve (1794) (1804); UD: 28 × 18-pounder long guns; SD: 6 × 8-pounder guns + 14 × 36-pounder obusiers

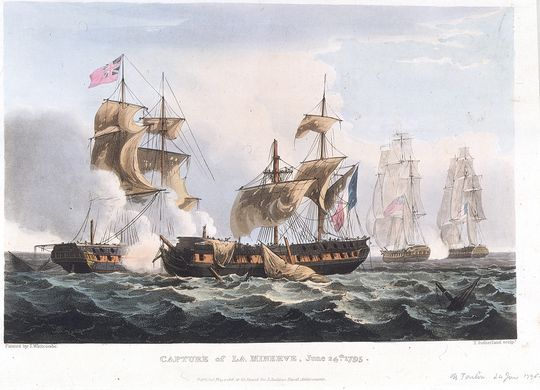

The Minerve class was a type of 40-gun frigate of the French Navy, carrying 18-pounder long guns as their main armament. Six ships of this type were built at Toulon Dockyard, and launched between 1782 and 1794. The frigates served the French Navy briefly during the French Revolutionary Wars. The Royal Navy captured all six between 1793 and 1799 and took them into service, with all but one serving in the Napoleonic Wars, and some thereafter.

The first four frigates were built to a design by Joseph-Marie-Blaise Coulomb. Jacques Brune Sainte Catherine modified Coulomb's design for the fifth, lengthening it to permit the addition of a 14th pair of gunports on the upper deck, although a 14th pair of guns was never carried in this pair of ports. Sainte Catherine further redesigned the class for the sixth, final frigate. The French Navy preferred the designs by Jacques-Noël Sané. However, the more rounded hull form of the Minerve-class vessels' found favour with the Royal Navy, leading it to copy the design.

== Dimensions ==
Type	Length (overall)	Length (keel)	Beam
Minerve (1782)	46.13 m (151.3 ft)	41.58 m (136.4 ft)	11.69 m (38.4 ft)
Perle	46.26 m (151.8 ft)	41.09 m (134.8 ft)	11.69 m (38.4 ft)
Minerve (1794)	48.07 m (157.7 ft)	42.87 m (140.6 ft)	12.02 m (39.4 ft)
	All feet are British measure		

== Ships ==
- Minerve

Ordered: 30 October 1781
Begun: January 1782
Launched: 31 July 1782
Completed: October 1782
Fate: Captured by the British 18 February 1794, taken into service as HMS San Fiorenzo, broken up 1837

- Junon

Ordered: 30 October 1781
Begun: February 1782
Launched: 31 July 1782
Completed: October 1782
Fate: Captured by the British 16 June 1799, taken in as HMS Princess Charlotte, renamed HMS Andromache January 1812, broken up 1828

- Impérieuse

Ordered: November 1785
Begun: February 1786
Launched: 11 July 1787
Completed: May 1788
Fate: Captured by the British 12 October 1793, taken in as HMS Captain, renamed HMS Unite 3 September 1803, hospital hulk 1836, broken up 1858

- Melpomène

Ordered: 1787
Begun: February 1788
Launched: 6 August 1789
Completed: April 1792
Fate: Captured by the British 10 August 1794, taken in as HMS Melpomene, sold on 14 December 1815

- Perle

Ordered: 1789
Begun: June 1789
Launched: 27 August 1790
Completed: September 1792
Fate: Handed over to the British 29 August 1793, taken in as HMS Amethyst, wrecked 27 December 1795

- Minerve (ii)

Ordered:
Begun: late 1791
Launched: 4 September 1794
Completed: October 1794
Fate: Captured by the British 23 June 1795, taken in as HMS Minerve, recaptured by the French 3 July 1803, renamed Canonnière, sold June 1809 and renamed Confiance, recaptured by the British 3 February 1810 and sold
