= French ship Entreprenant (1787) =

Ship of the line of the French Navy

- Scale model of Achille, sister ship of French ship Entreprenant (1787), on display at the Musée national de la Marine in Paris.

History

France
- Name: Entreprenant
- Builder: Lorient
- Laid down: May 1786
- Launched: 12 October 1787
- In service: 1788
- Out of service: 9 November 1802
- Fate: Broken up, 1803

General characteristics
- Class & type: Téméraire-class ship of the line
- Displacement: 3,069 tonneaux
- Tons burthen: 1,537 port tonneaux
- Length: 55.87 m (183 ft 4 in)
- Beam: 14.46 m (47 ft 5 in)
- Draught: 7.15 m (23.5 ft)
- Depth of hold: 7.15 m (23 ft 5 in)
- Sail plan: Full-rigged ship
- Crew: 705
- Armament: 74 guns: Lower gun deck: 28 × 36 pdr guns; Upper gun deck: 30 × 18 pdr guns; Forecastle and Quarterdeck: 12 × 8 pdr guns, 10 × 36 pdr carronades

Entreprenant was a 74-gun Téméraire-class ship of the line built for the French Navy during the 1780s. Completed in 1785, she played a minor role in the French Revolutionary Wars.

== Description ==
The Téméraire-class ships had a length of 55.87 metres (183 ft 4 in), a beam of 14.46 metres (47 ft 5 in) and a depth of hold of 7.15 metres (23 ft 5 in). The ships displaced 3,069 tonneaux and had a mean draught of 7.15 metres (23 ft 5 in). They had a tonnage of 1,537 port tonneaux. Their crew numbered 705 officers and ratings during wartime. They were fitted with three masts and ship rigged.

The muzzle-loading, smoothbore armament of the Téméraire class consisted of twenty-eight 36-pounder long guns on the lower gun deck, thirty 18-pounder long guns and thirty 18-pounder long guns on the upper gun deck. On the quarterdeck and forecastle were a total of a dozen 8-pounder long guns and ten 36-pounder carronades.

== Construction and career ==
Entreprenant was laid down at the Arsenal de Lorient in May 1786 and launched on 12 October 1787. She was completed sometime the following year. In December 1792, Entreprenant towed the Languedoc to safety after she had been damaged in a storm. Entreprenant participated in the French expedition to Sardinia the following year. She was taken by the British when they captured Toulon in 1793, but was returned to ferry prisoners suspected of anti-revolutionary sympathies from Toulon to Rochefort after Toulon was taken by the British. The ship took part in the Glorious First of June and in the Croisière du Grand Hiver.

== Bibliography ==
- Roche, Jean-Michel (2005). Dictionnaire des bâtiments de la flotte de guerre française de Colbert à nos jours [Dictionary of French Warships from Colbert to Today]. Vol. 1: 1671-1870. Roche. ISBN 978-2-9525917-0-6. OCLC 165892922.
- Winfield, Rif and Roberts, Stephen S. (2015) French Warships in the Age of Sail 1786-1861: Design, Construction, Careers and Fates. Seaforth Publishing. ISBN 978-1-84832-204-2
