= HMS Robust =

Three vessels of the Royal Navy, two actual and one whose construction was cancelled, have been named HMS Robust:

- HMS Robust (1764) was a 74-gun third-rate ship of the line of the Royal Navy, launched in 1764 at Harwich.
- HMS Robust (1859) – construction was suspended in 1861, and cancelled in 1872.
- HMS Robust (1971) – a fleet tug
