= French ship Thémistocle (1791) =

French Navy ship

- Scale model of Achille, sister ship of French ship Thémistocle (1791), on display at the Musée national de la Marine in Paris.

History

France
- Name: Thémistocle
- Namesake: Themistocles
- Ordered: 19 October 1787
- Builder: Lorient
- Laid down: 1 September 1789
- Launched: 12 September 1791
- Completed: September 1792
- Fate: Burnt 18 December 1793

General characteristics
- Class & type: Téméraire-class ship of the line
- Displacement: 3,069 tonneaux
- Tons burthen: 1,537 port tonneaux
- Length: 55.87 m (183 ft 4 in)
- Beam: 14.46 m (47 ft 5 in)
- Draught: 7.15 m (23.5 ft)
- Depth of hold: 7.15 m (23 ft 5 in)
- Sail plan: Full-rigged ship
- Crew: 705
- Armament: 74 guns: Lower gun deck: 28 × 36 pdr guns; Upper gun deck: 30 × 18 pdr guns; Forecastle and Quarterdeck: 16 × 8 pdr guns

Thémistocle was a 74-gun Téméraire-class ship of the line built for the French Navy during the 1780s. Completed in 1792, she played a minor role in the French Revolutionary Wars.

== Description ==
The Téméraire-class ships had a length of 55.87 metres (183 ft 4 in), a beam of 14.46 metres (47 ft 5 in) and a depth of hold of 7.15 metres (23 ft 5 in). The ships displaced 3,069 tonneaux and had a mean draught of 7.15 metres (23 ft 5 in). They had a tonnage of 1,537 port tonneaux. Their crew numbered 705 officers and ratings during wartime. They were fitted with three masts and ship rigged.

The muzzle-loading, smoothbore armament of the Téméraire class consisted of twenty-eight 36-pounder long guns on the lower gun deck, thirty 18-pounder long guns and thirty 18-pounder long guns on the upper gun deck. On the quarterdeck and forecastle were a total of sixteen 8-pounder long guns. Beginning with the ships completed after 1787, the armament of the Téméraires began to change with the addition of four 36-pounder obusiers on the poop deck (dunette). Some ships had instead twenty 8-pounders.

== Construction and career ==
Thémistocle was ordered on 19 October 1787 and was laid down at the Arsenal de Lorient on 1 June 1789. The ship was launched on 12 September 1791 and completed in September 1792. The ship was transferred to the Mediterranean Fleet soon after her commissioned to reinforce the squadron under Admiral Truguet.

After Toulon was surrendered by Royalist sympathisers in October 1793, Thémistocle was seized by the British. The ship was used as a prison ship during the Siege of Toulon. At the fall of the city, Captain Sidney Smith of the Royal Navy had her scuttled by fire on 18 December, along with her sister ship Héros. The wreck was refloated in 1804 and broken up.
