= HMS Amethyst (1793) =

British sailing frigate (1793–1795)

History

France
- Name: Perle
- Namesake: Pearl
- Ordered: 1789
- Builder: Toulon Dockyard
- Laid down: June 1789
- Launched: 27 August 1790
- Fate: Handed over to the Royal Navy in August 1793

Great Britain
- Name: HMS Amethyst
- Acquired: August 1793
- Fate: Wrecked 30 December 1795

General characteristics
- Class & type: Minerve-class frigate
- Displacement: 1362 tonneaux
- Tons burthen: 700 port tonneaux; 102880/94 (bm)
- Length: Overall:150 ft 4 in (45.8 m); Keel:124 ft 6 in (37.9 m)
- Beam: 39 ft 5 in (12.0 m)
- Depth of hold: 12 ft 10 1/2 in (3.9 m)
- Complement: French Navy:324; Royal Navy:300
- Armament: French Navy: 26 × 18-pounder long guns; SD:10–14 × 8-pounder long guns; Royal Navy: Upper deck:28 × 18-pounder guns; QD:10 × 6-pounder guns + 6 × 32-pounder carronades; Fc:2 × 6-pounder guns

HMS Amethyst was launched in 1790 as the French frigate Perle. The British Royal Navy took possession of her at Toulon in 1793. She was wrecked in 1795 at Alderney.

== French frigate ==
Jacques Brun Sainte Catherine modified a 1782 design by Joseph-Marie-Blaise Coulomb to produce Perle. The key change was a slight lengthening to permit the addition of a 14th pair of gunports on the upper deck.

On 21 December 1792 Perle was under the command of sous-lieutenant de vaisseau Van Kempen and carrying passengers from Toulon to Corsica when she grounded near Galéria. Consequently, she spent January to May 1793 undergoing repairs.

In 1793 Perle sailed from Toulon to Ajaccio and then to Calvi, Haute-Corse. She was still under the command of Van Kempen, who had received a promotion to lieutenant de vaisseau. At Calvi, on 20–21 April, she assisted in its defense against Pasquale Paoli's partisans. Perle then returned to Toulon.

Perle was among the vessels that the French Royalists surrendered to the Royal Navy at Toulon on 29 August 1793. Her French Royalist crew fled to Portoferraio when the Republicans recaptured Toulon. The British took her with them when they left on 18 December.

== Fate ==
The Royal Navy took Perle into service as HMS Amethyst. She underwent fitting at Portsmouth between December 1794 and September 1795. Captain Thomas Affleck commissioned her, but proceeded to wreck her at Alderney on 30 December 1795. She left Prawle Point on the evening of 29 December in company with three other ships, but lost them. Captain Affleck went to bed having left vague orders and when notified that warning signals had been heard, simply instructed the officer of the watch to maintain the course. Amethyst struck rocks, but drove over. A massive leak developed and it was decided that she could not go back to England for repairs. Instead, she was sailed to Braye Bay, Alderney and beached. The court martial on 8 March 1796 was highly critical of Captain Affleck. It ordered him to be placed at the bottom of the list of seniority for captains. The Navy never employed him again.

== Post script ==
Amethyst's guns were retrieved from the wreck and used to arm batteries constructed for them on Alderney.

The Service Historique de la Marine in Paris (rf D1.69 f°135) holds her original plans. The plans the British made after her capture are at the National Maritime Museum, Greenwich. (rf 6189 to 6193).
