= List of ship launches in 1782 =

The list of ship launches in 1782 includes a chronological list of some ships launched in 1782.

Date	Ship	Class	Builder	Location	Country	Notes
2 January	Winterton	East Indiaman		Blackwall, London	Great Britain	For British East India Company.
14 January	Medea	Fourth rate	Willem Lodwijk van Genth	Amsterdam	Dutch Republic	For Dutch Navy.
28 January	Busbridge	East Indiaman	John Perry	Blackwall	Great Britain	For British East India Company.
30 January	General Goddard	East Indiaman	John Randall	Rotherhithe	Great Britain	For William Money.
January	Fairford	East Indiaman	Barnard	Deptford	Great Britain	For British East India Company.
1 February	Pluto	Tisiphone-class fireship	Joshua Stewart	Sandgate	Great Britain	For Royal Navy.
13 February	Atlas	Duke-class ship of the line		Chatham Dockyard	Great Britain	For Royal Navy.
16 February	Dictateur	Pégase-class ship of the line		Toulon	Kingdom of France	For French Navy.
February	Cigogne	Storeship		Bayonne	Kingdom of France	For French Navy.
4 March	Flirt	Speedy-class brig	Thomas King	Dover	Great Britain	For Royal Navy.
6 March	Suffisant	Pégase-class ship of the line		Toulon	Kingdom of France	For French Navy.
13 March	Puissant	Pégase-class ship of the line		Lorient	Kingdom of France	For French Navy.
15 March	Crown	Crown-class ship of the line	Perry	Blackwall	Great Britain	For Royal Navy.
17 March	Otter	Childers-class sloop	Andrew Hills	Sandwich	Great Britain	For Royal Navy.
19 March	Spitfire	Tisiphone-class fireship	Stephen Teague	Ipswich	France	For Royal Navy.
29 March	San Fermin	San Fermin-class ship of the line		Pasaia	Spain	For Spanish Navy.
30 March	Bengal	Ganges-class ship of the line	John Randall	Rotherhithe	Great Britain	For British East India Company.
30 March	Mediator	Roebuck-class ship	Thomas Raymond	Northam	Great Britain	For Royal Navy.
30 March	Sea Horse	Merchantman	Randall & Brent	Gravesend	Great Britain	For Hudson's Bay Company.
12 April	Hercules	Third rate			Dutch Republic	For Dutch Navy.
27 April	Polyphemus	Intrepid-class ship of the line		Sheerness Dockyard	Great Britain	For Royal Navy.
29 April	Inspector	Sloop-of-war	Moses Game	Wivenhoe	Great Britain	For Royal Navy.
April	Jupiter	Third rate	A. Staats	Amsterdam	Dutch Republic	For Dutch Navy.
12 May	Heureux	Centaure-class ship of the line		Toulon	Kingdom of France	For French Navy.
15 May	Lamproie	Dromadaire-class Flûte (ship)		Havre de Grâce	Kingdom of France	For French Navy.
21 May	Rodislav	Aziia-class ship of the line	M. D. Portnov	Arkhangelsk	Russia	For Imperial Russian Navy.
21 May	Vysheslav	Aziia-class ship of the line	M. D. Portnov	Arkhangelsk	Russia	For Imperial Russian Navy
25 May	Alcide	Pégase-class ship of the line		Rochefort	Kingdom of France	For French Navy.
25 May	Greyhound	Privateer		Salem, Massachusetts	United States	For Massachusetts State Navy.
29 May	Barbeau	Dromadair-class Flûte (ship)		Havre de Grâce	Kingdom of France	For French Navy.
29 May	Cato	Grampus-class frigate	William Cleverley	Gravesend	Great Britain	For Royal Navy.
30 May	Nymphe	Nymphe-class frigate		Brest	Kingdom of France	For French Navy.
1 June	Arveprinds Frederick	Prindsesse Sophia Frederica-class ship of the line		Copenhagen	Denmark-Norway	For Dano-Norwegian Navy.
12 June	Phaeton	Minerva-class frigate	John Smallshaw	Liverpool	Great Britain	For Royal Navy.
14 June	Bombay Castle	Elizabeth-class ship of the line	Perry	Blackwall Yard	Great Britain	For Royal Navy.
22 June	Det Store Bælt	Frigate	Henrik Gerner	Copenhagen	Denmark-Norway	For Dano-Norwegian Navy.
25 June	Hébé	Hébé-class frigate		Saint-Malo	Kingdom of France	For French Navy.
29 June	Speedy	Speedy-class brig	Thomas King	Dover	Great Britain	For Royal Navy.
9 July	Cerf Volant	Cerf-Volant-class lugger		Calais	Kingdom of France	For French Navy.
11 July	Resistance	Fifth rate	Edward Greaves	Limehouse	Great Britain	For Royal Navy.
14 July	Vénus	Hébé-class frigate		Brest	Kingdom of France	For French Navy.
24 July	Pivert	Cerf-Volant-class lugger	Jacques Denys	Dunkirk	Kingdom of France	For French Navy.
25 July	Vanneau	Cerf-Volant-class lugger	Daniel Denys	Dunkirk	Kingdom of France	For French Navy.
25 July	Zeepard	Sixth rate		Amsterdam	Dutch Republic	For Dutch Navy.
31 July	Minerve	Minerve-class frigate		Toulon	Kingdom of France	For French Navy.
12 August	Incendiary	Tisiphone-class fireship	Thomas King	Dover	Great Britain	For Royal Navy.
14 August	Junon	Junon-class frigate		Toulon	Kingdom of France	For French Navy.
15 August	Thalia	Flora-class frigate	John Nowlan	Bursledon	Great Britain	For Royal Navy.
22 August	Tiercelet	Vanneau-class lugger	Jacques Denys	Dunkirk	Kingdom of France	For French Navy.
24 August	Censeur	Pégase-class ship of the line		Rochefort	Kingdom of France	For French Navy.
24 August	Gerfaut	Vanneau-class lugger		Dunkirk	Kingdom of France	For French Navy.
26 August	Dvenadtsatyi	Vosmoi-class frigate	S. I. Afanaseyev	Novokoperskaya	Russia	For Imperial Russian Navy.
7 September	Sylphe	Cerf-Volant-class lugger		Boulogne	Kingdom of France	For French Navy.
7 September	Courrier	Vanneau-class lugger		Boulogne	Kingdom of France	For French Navy.
9 September	Hermione	Hermione-class frigate	Sydenham Teast	Bristol	Great Britain	For Royal Navy.
21 September	Ballon	Vanneau-class lugger		Boulogne	Kingdom of France	For French Navy.
23 September	Barwell	Merchantman	John & William Wells	Deptford	Great Britain	For Richard Neave.
23 September	Falcon	Brig sloop	Hills	Sandwich	Great Britain	For Royal Navy.
23 September	Houghton	East Indiaman	Wells	Deptford	Great Britain	For Cullen Smith.
23 September	Thetis	Minerve-class frigate	John Randall	Rotherhithe	Great Britain	For Royal Navy.
24 September	Syren	Amazon-class frigate	James Betts	Mistleythorn	Great Britain	For Royal Navy.
5 October	Lord Macartney	East Indiaman	Perry	Blackwall	Great Britain	For Robert Preston.
8 October	Echo	Sloop-of-war	John Barton	Liverpool	Great Britain	For Royal Navy.
8 October	Grampus	Grampus-class frigate	John Fisher	Liverpool	Great Britain	For Royal Navy.
8 October	Standard	Intrepid-class ship of the line	Adam Hayes	Deptford Dockyard	Great Britain	For Royal Navy.
9 October	Trusty	Fourth rate	Hilhouse	Bristol	Great Britain	For Royal Navy.
15 October	Dictateur	Third rate		Toulon	Kingdom of France	For French Navy.
22 October	Scipio	Crown-class ship of the line	Barnard	Deptford	Great Britain	For Royal Navy.
5 November	America	Ship of the line	James Hackett	Kittery, Maine	United States	For Continental Navy.
6 November	Kronprins Gustaf Adolf	Third rate	Frederik Henrik af Chapman	Karlskrona	Sweden	For Royal Swedish Navy.
7 November	Centaure	Centaure-class ship of the line		Toulon	Kingdom of France	For French Navy.
7 November	Serapis	Roebuck-class ship	Hilhouse	Bristol	Great Britain	For Royal Navy.
7 November	Sulivan	East Indiaman	Barnard	Deptford	Great Britain	For Robert Williams.
8 November	Fletcher	East Indiaman	Perry & Randall	Rotherhithe	Great Britain	For Robert Preston.
10 November	Bulldog	Zebra-class sloop	Henry Ladd	Dover	Great Britain	For Royal Navy.
12 November	Admiraal Tjerk Hiddes De Vries	Third rate	Sjoerd Jouwerts Stapert	Harlingen	Dutch Republic	For Dutch Navy.
5 December	Holland	Third rate		Amsterdam	Dutch Republic	For Dutch Navy.
6 December	Irresistible	Albion-class ship of the line	Barnard	Harwich	Great Britain	For Royal Navy.
6 December	Stad en Lande	Third rate	Pieter Tetrode & Co.	Harlingen	Dutch Republic	For Dutch Navy.
7 December	Nuestra Señora del Pilar	Fifth rate		Ferrol	Spain	For Spanish Navy.
17 December	Téméraire	Téméraire-class ship of the line		Brest	Kingdom of France	For French Navy.
19 December	Diadem	Intrepid-class ship of the line	Nicholas Phillips	Chatham Dockyard	Great Britain	For Royal Navy.
21 December	Ardent	Crown-class ship of the line	Staves & Parsons	Bursledon	Great Britain	For Royal Navy.
23 December	Dwinger	Hulk		Harlingen	Dutch Republic	For Dutch Navy.
December	Raymond	East Indiaman	Perry	Blackwall	Great Britain	For Henry Bolton.
Unknown date	Alarm	Cutter	Nicholas Bools	Bridport	Great Britain	For HM Customs.
Unknown date	Alexandre	Merchantman			Kingdom of France	For private owner.
Unknown date	Alkmaar	Fourth rate		Enkhuizen	Dutch Republic	For Dutch Navy.
Unknown date	Amity	Snow		Sunderland	Great Britain	For pricate owner.
Unknown date	Aurora	Merchantman		Hull	Great Britain	For Private owner.
Unknown date	Baron de Binder	Merchantman			Kingdom of France	For Pierre-Jacques Meslé de Grandclos.
Unknown date	Barracouta	Sloop of war	Joshua Stewart	Sandgate	Great Britain	For Royal Navy.
Unknown date	Bellona	East Indiaman	William Woolcombe	Limehouse	Great Britain	For Boyd & Co..
Unknown date	Brakel	Fourth rate	Jan Salomonszoon van den Tempel	Rotterdam	Dutch Republic	For Dutch Navy.
unknown date	Britannia	Merchantman			(Kingdom of Great Britain) Newfoundland	For Wardell.
Unknown date	Castor	Merchantman	Spedding & Co.	Whitehaven	Great Britain	For Daniel Brocklebank.
Unknown date	Constantia	East Indiaman		Delfshaven	Dutch Republic	For Dutch East India Company.
Unknown date	Delft	Fourth rate	De Hoog	Delfshaven	Dutch Republic	For Dutch Navy.
Unknown date	Drenthe	Third rate		Amsterdam	Dutch Republic	For Dutch Navy.
Unknown date	Duc de Lauzun	Transport ship			United States	For Continental Navy.
Unknown date	Edjer-i Bahri	Third rate		Midilli	Ottoman Empire	For Ottoman Navy.
Unknown date	Francis and Eliza	Brig		River Thames	Great Britain	For private owner.
Unknown date	General Coote	East Indiaman	John Barnard		Great Britain	For British East India Company.
Unknown date	Hannibal	Sloop of war	Perch		Great Britain	For Royal Navy.
Unknown date	Hulk	Corvette		Amsterdam	Dutch Republic	For Dutch Navy.
Unknown date	Hyena	Uitlegger		Medemblik	Dutch Republic	For Dutch Navy.
Unknown date	Kingfisher	Sloop of war		Rochester, Kent	Great Britain	For Royal Navy.
Unknown date	Portefaix	Dromadaire-class Flûte (ship)		Bayonne	Kingdom of France	For French Navy.
Unknown date	Maasnimf	Unrated		Rotterdam	Dutch Republic	For Dutch Navy.
Unknown date	Monnikendam	Fourth rate	J. Hand	Enkhuizen	Dutch Republic	For Dutch Navy.
Unknown date	Neptunus	Second rate		Amsterdam	Dutch Republic	For Dutch Navy.
Unknown date	Nusret-i Yezdan	Fourth rate		Sinop	Ottoman Empire	For Ottoman Navy.
Unknown date	Overijssel	Third rate	Booy	Amsterdam	Dutch Republic	For Dutch Navy.
Unknown date	Sally	West Indiaman		Liverpool	Great Britain	For private owner.
Unknown date	Santa Elizabetta	Fifth rate		Valetta	Malta	For Maltese Navy.
Unknown date	Santa Maria	Fifth rate		Valetta	Malta	For Maltese Navy.
Unknown date	Scarborough	Barque	Fowler & Heward	Scarborough	Great Britain	For George, John and Thomas Hopper.
Unknown date	Şehper-i Zafer	Fifth rate		Constantinople	Ottoman Empire	For Ottoman Navy.
Unknown date	Theodosia	Merchantman		South Shields	Great Britain	For private owner.
Unknown date	Tholen	Fourth rate			Dutch Republic	For Dutch Navy.
Unknown date	Tijger	Fourth rate		Amsterdam	Dutch Republic	For Dutch Navy.
Unknown date	Trinadtsatyi	Vosmoi-class frigate	O. Matveev	Gnilotonskaya	Russia	For Imperial Russian Navy.
Unknown date	Victoire	Privateer		Dunkirk	Kingdom of France	For private owner.
Unknown date	Vrijheid	Third rate			Dutch Republic	For Dutch Navy.
Unknown date	Wasp	Sloop-of-war		Folkestone	Great Britain	For Royal Navy.
Unknown date	Name unknown	Merchantman			Denmark-Norway	For private owner.
Unknown date	Name unknown	Paddle steamer	Marquis de Jouffroy	Lyon	Kingdom of France	For Marquis de Jouffroy.
