= French ship Censeur =

Ship of the line of the French Navy

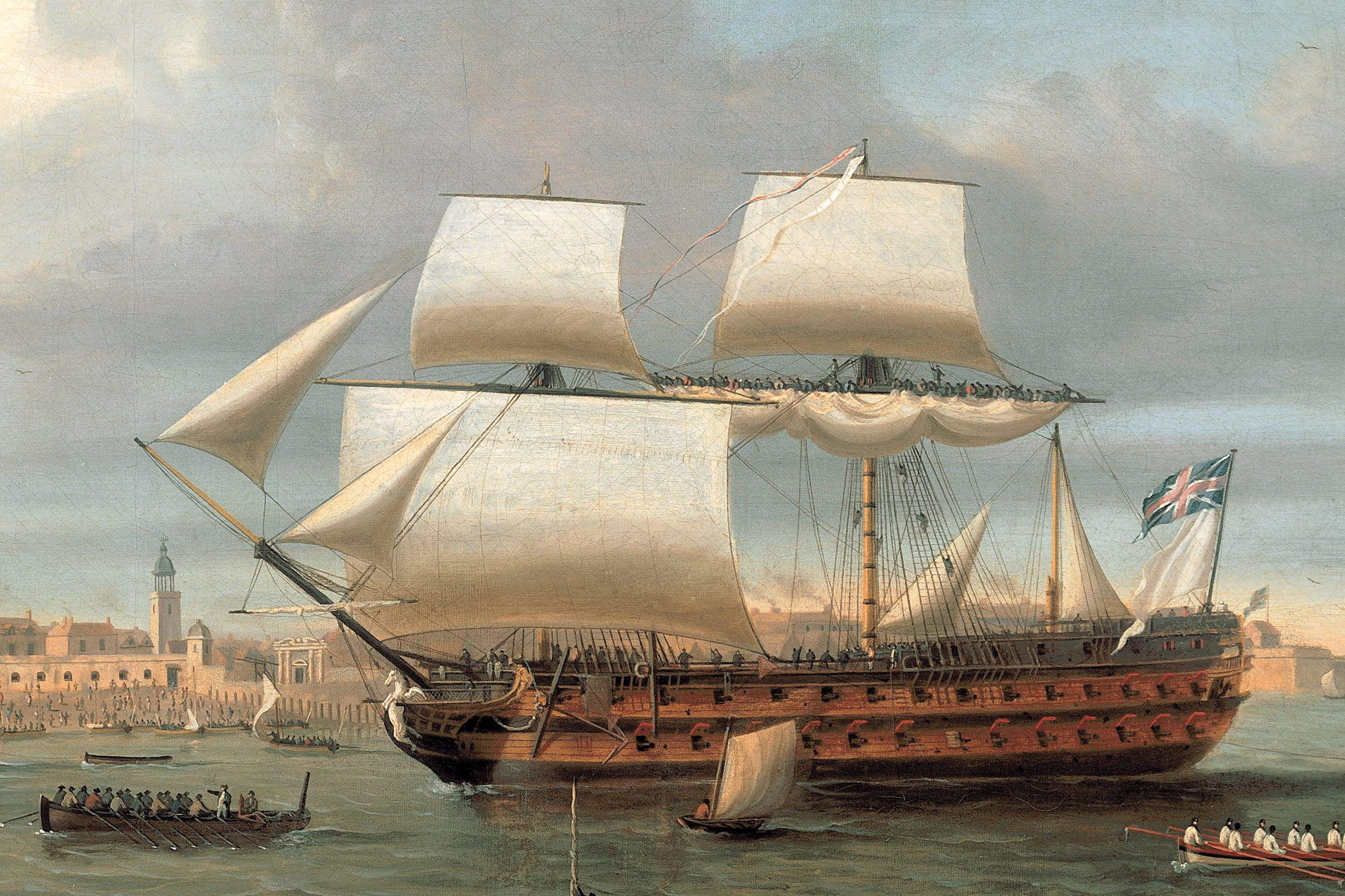
- Censeur's sister ship Pégase

History

France
- Name: Censeur
- Builder: Rochefort
- Laid down: August 1781
- Launched: 24 August 1782
- Commissioned: By October 1782
- Captured: By the British at the Battle of Genoa on 14 March 1795

Great Britain
- Name: Censeur
- Acquired: Captured from the French on 14 March 1795
- Captured: By the French on 7 October 1795

France
- Name: Révolution
- Fate: Transferred to Spain and broken up in 1799

General characteristics
- Class & type: 74-gun Pégase-class ship of the line
- Displacement: 3,000 tonneaux
- Tons burthen: 1,515 port tonneaux; 1,820 bm
- Length: 178 ft 9 in (54.48 m) (gundeck); 146 ft 5.5 in (44.641 m) (keel)
- Beam: 48 ft 0.75 in (14.6495 m)
- Depth of hold: 21 ft 4 in (6.50 m)
- Propulsion: Sails
- Sail plan: Full-rigged ship
- Complement: 640
- Armament: 74 guns of various weights of shot

Censeur was a 74-gun Pégase-class ship of the line of the French Navy, launched in 1782. She served during the last months of the American War of Independence, and survived to see action in the French Revolutionary Wars. She was briefly captured by the British, but was retaken after a few months and taken back into French service as Révolution. She served until 1799, when she was transferred to the Spanish Navy, but was found to be rotten and was broken up.

== Construction and early service ==
Censeur was laid down at Rochefort in August 1781 to a design by Antoine Groignard.^{[a]} Launched on 24 August 1782, she had entered service by October that year. She was one of the ships captured during the occupation of Toulon in 1793, though she was left to fall into Republican hands intact in the withdrawal.

=== Capture ===
On 3 March 1795 Censeur, under her captain Louis-Marie Coudé, formed part of a fleet of 15 ships of the line under the command of Counter-Admiral Pierre Martin, which sailed from Toulon bound for Corsica with 5,000 troops. The fleet was intercepted in the Gulf of Genoa on 13 March by a British force under the command of Vice-Admiral William Hotham, which promptly gave chase to the French. Martin attempted to flee, but in the confusion two of his 80-gun ships, Ça Ira and Victoire, collided, causing the Ça Ira to lose her fore and main topmasts. Several British ships, including the 64-gun HMS Agamemnon under Captain Horatio Nelson, came up to the straggling Ça Ira and opened fire, causing Martin to double back to protect her. A cautious Hotham called his ships back and reformed the line, and as night fell Martin disengaged and resumed his flight, with the Censeur towing the Ça Ira. At daybreak on 14 March the British resumed their attack on the still lagging Ça Ira and Censeur. Martin again attempted to come to their aid, but after some heavy fighting, withdrew with his transports, leaving both ships to be captured by the British. The two ships fought on until Censeur had lost her fore and main masts, and sustained combined casualties of 400 men.

== British service and recapture ==
She was placed under the temporary command of Commander Thomas Boys immediately after her capture, after which Captain Sir John Gore was placed in command. Censeur, jury-rigged and armed en flûte was then sent back to England with a convoy under Commodore Thomas Taylor. It consisted of 63 merchants of the Levant convoy, the 74-gun ships HMS Fortitude under Taylor, and HMS Bedford under Captain Augustus Montgomery, the 44-gun HMS Argo under Captain Richard Randall Burgess, the 32-gun frigates HMS Juno, Captain Lord Amelius Beauclerk, HMS Lutine, Captain William Haggit, and the fireship HMS Tisiphone, Captain Joseph Turner. The convoy called at Gibraltar on 25 September, at which point thirty-two of the merchants left that night in company with Argo and Juno. The rest of the fleet sailed together, reaching Cape St Vincent by the early morning of 7 October. At this point a sizeable French squadron was sighted bearing up, consisting of six ships of the line and three frigates under Rear-Admiral Joseph de Richery. The British ships of the line formed a defensive line, but as they were doing so Censeur's jury-rigged foretopmast carried away, and only having been fitted with a frigate's mainmast, she was obliged to fall behind. Fortitude and Bedford hung back to support her, and resisted the French attack for an hour, during which Censeur's remaining top masts were shot away and she exhausted her supply of powder. Gore surrendered his ship, and the remaining British warships and one surviving merchant of the convoy made their escape.

== Last years ==
She was re-added to French Navy as Révolution and served with them until 1799, when she was transferred by France to Spain in consequence of the Second Treaty of San Ildefonso. In exchange for Censeur the French received the Spanish 74-gun San Sebastian, which they renamed Alliance. Censeur was however found to be rotten, and was broken up.

== Notes ==
a. The six ships of the Pégase-class proved unlucky in their encounters with the Royal Navy. Pégase, the nameship of the class, was captured by the British in 1782, less than a year after being launched, and served in the Royal Navy until 1815. Liberté, Suffisant, Puissant, Alcide and Censeur were all taken by Royalist forces during the occupation of Toulon in 1793, with Liberté and Suffisant being burnt in the withdrawal, Puissant taken away and added to the Royal Navy, and Alcide and Censeur left to fall back into Republican hands. Alcide blew up while fighting a British and Neopolitan fleet at the Naval Battle of Hyères Islands in July 1795.
