= Charles Paterson =

Charles Paterson may refer to:

- Charles Paterson (cricketer) (1882–1973), Scottish cricketer
- Charles William Paterson (1765–1841), Royal Navy officer

== See also ==
- Charles Patterson (disambiguation)
