= French ship Alcide =

At least two ships of the French Navy have been named Alcide:

- French ship Alcide (1743) a 64-gun ship of the line launched in 1743 and captured by the Royal Navy in 1755
- French ship Alcide (1782) a 74-gun Pégase-class ship of the line launched in 1782 and lost in 1795
