= French ship Dictateur (1782) =

Ship of the line of the French Navy

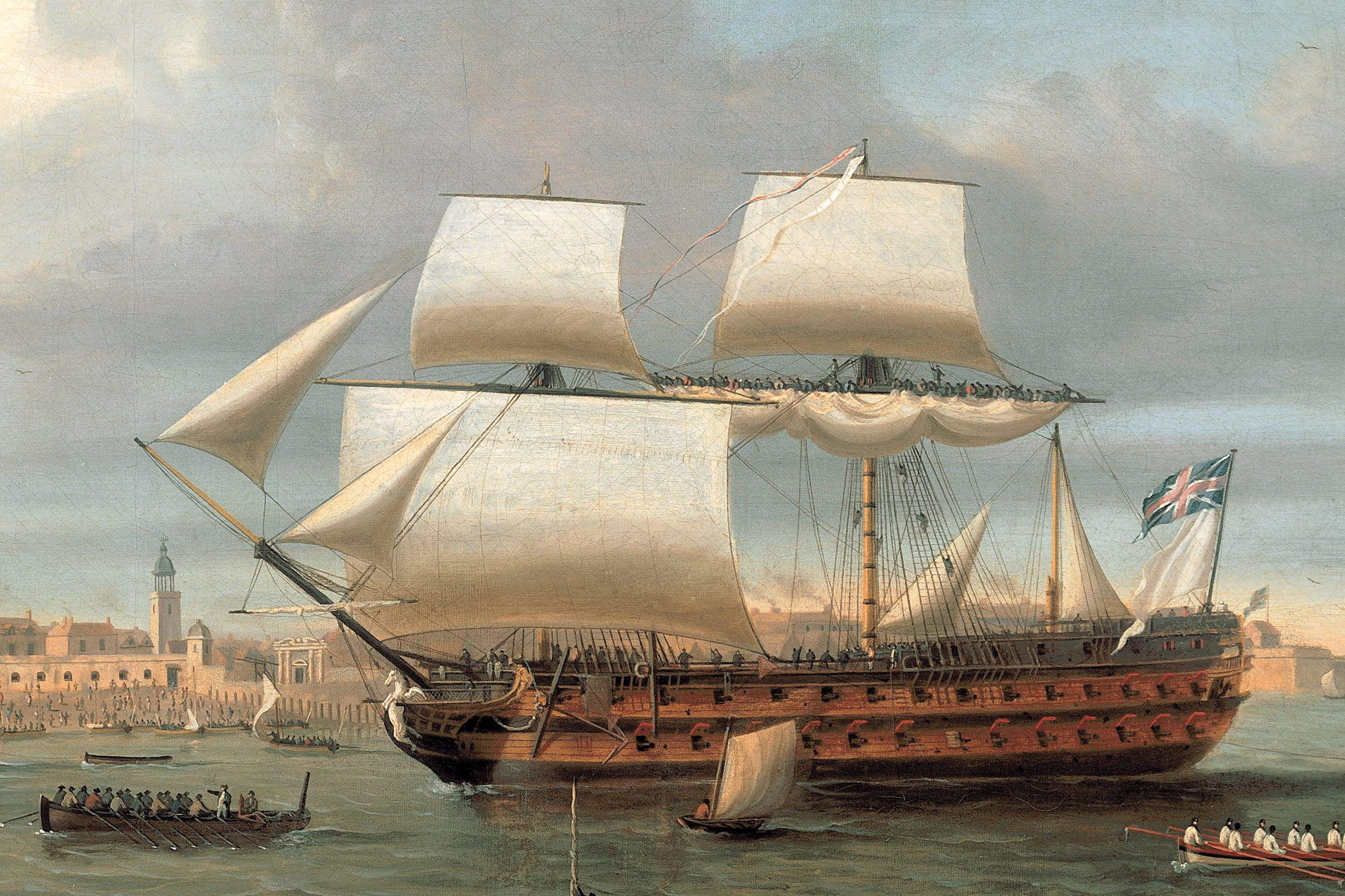
- Dictateur's sister ship Pégase entering Portsmouth Harbour in 1782

History

France
- Name: Dictateur
- Builder: Toulon
- Laid down: July 1781
- Launched: 16 February 1782
- Commissioned: August 1782
- Captured: By the British Navy at the occupation of Toulon on 29 August 1793
- Fate: Burnt at the evacuation of Toulon on 18 December 1793

General characteristics
- Class & type: 74-gun Pégase-class ship of the line
- Displacement: 3,000 tonneaux
- Tons burthen: 1,515 port tonneaux; 1,820 bm
- Length: 178 ft 9 in (54.48 m) (gundeck); 146 ft 5.5 in (44.641 m) (keel)
- Beam: 48 ft 0.75 in (14.6495 m)
- Depth of hold: 21 ft 4 in (6.50 m)
- Propulsion: Sails
- Sail plan: Full-rigged ship
- Complement: 750
- Armament: 74 guns comprising: Lower deck 28 × 36-pounders; Upper deck 30 × 18-pounders; 'Gaillards' (quarterdeck); 16 × 8-pounders

Dictateur was a 74-gun Pégase-class ship of the line of the French Navy, launched in 1782. She served during the last months of the American War of Independence, and survived to see action in the French Revolutionary Wars.

== Construction and early service ==
Dictateur was laid down at Toulon Dockyard in July 1781 to a design by Antoine Groignard.^{[a]} Launched on 16 February 1782, she had entered service by August of that year. She was renamed Liberté in September 1792 by the Revolutionary government.

=== Capture ===
The Liberté was handed over by French Royalists at Toulon to the Anglo-Spanish occupying forces during the occupation of Toulon in August 1793, but was burnt at the subsequent evacuation of that port in December to avoid her being taken back into French service.

== Notes ==
a. The six ships of the Pégase-class proved unlucky in their encounters with the Royal Navy. Pégase, the nameship of the class, was captured by the British in 1782, less than a year after being launched, and served in the Royal Navy until 1815. The other five - Liberté, Suffisant, Puissant, Alcide and Censeur - were all taken by Royalist forces during the occupation of Toulon in 1793, with Liberté and Suffisant being burnt in the withdrawal, Puissant taken away and added to the Royal Navy, and Alcide and Censeur left to fall back into Republican hands. Alcide subsequently blew up while fighting a British fleet at the Naval Battle of Hyères Islands in July 1795.
