= List of shipwrecks in 1866 =

The list of shipwrecks in 1866 includes ships sunk, foundered, grounded, or otherwise lost during 1866.

table of contents
1866
Jan	Feb	Mar	Apr
May	Jun	Jul	Aug
Sep	Oct	Nov	Dec
Unknown date

== Unknown date ==
List of shipwrecks: Unknown date 1866
Ship	State	Description
Alex Majors	United States	The steamboat sank in the Missouri River at Grand River.
Edward	United Kingdom	The ship was driven ashore and wrecked at "Taewan".
Emma	(United Kingdom of Great Britain and Ireland) Western Australia	The schooner was wrecked at the North West Cape. She was on a voyage from Port Walcot to Fremantle. All on board survived the wreck, but were captured by the local inhabitants. They were subsequently killed and eaten.
Ernestine	Stettin	The ship foundered in the Gulf of Mexico. She was on a voyage from Minatitlán, Mexico to London, United Kingdom.
General McNeil	Unknown	The sternwheel paddle steamer struck a snag and sank in the Missouri River at Howards Bend near St. Louis, Missouri, sometime during the 1860s.
Jane	United Kingdom	The full-rigged ship was wrecked.
Kate	(United Kingdom of Great Britain and Ireland) New Zealand	The ketch was wrecked at Okarito in late April or early May.
Kenna	Kingdom of Hanover	The schooner departed from Seville, Spain for the River Tyne in late May or early June. No further trace was found; she was presumed foundered with the loss of all on board.
Lanuca, or Laura	United Kingdom	The ship was wrecked on Formosa.
Lilly	United Kingdom	The ship was driven ashore at "Taewan".
Loda	United Kingdom	The ship was destroyed by fire. She was on a voyage from Cardiff, Glamorgan to Melbourne, Victoria and Shanghai, China.
Napoleon Canavero	Peru	The clipper was set afire by rebellious coolies. She was on a voyage from China to Callao. Her crew abandoned ship, leaving 650 people secured aboard to their fate.
Nelly	United Kingdom	The ship was driven ashore at "Tawnfoo".
Penang	United States	The barque ran aground in the Paracel Islands between 25 March and 6 May. She was on a voyage from Saigon, French Cochinchina to Hong Kong. She was refloated and resumed her voyage in a severely leaky condition.
Polades	United Kingdom	The ship was wrecked on Formosa.
R. G. Porter	United States	The schooner was lost at Point Pleasant, New Jersey.
Rising Dawn	(United Kingdom of Great Britain and Ireland) British North America	The ship was sunk by ice at Ivituut, Greenland.
Rylanders	United Kingdom	The ship was wrecked.
Santiago	Chile	The ship was wrecked on George Island, Falkland Islands. Her crew was rescued. She was on a voyage from Iquique to Marseille, Bouches-du-Rhône, France.
Sarah	(United Kingdom of Great Britain and Ireland) Victoria	The schooner was wrecked to the north of the mouth of the Rangitikei River during a heavy gale early in the year. All hands were saved.
Victoria	United States	The 487-ton sidewheel paddle steamer was lost in 1866.
