= Royal Edward (ship) =

Several ships have been named Royal Edward:

- Royal Edward (1796 ship) was launched in 1782 in France as Alexandre. The British captured her c.1796, and new owners changed her name. She then sailed for a few years as a West Indiaman before completing four voyages as a slave ship. She returned to the West India trade after leaving the slave trade, and then traded more generally. She was condemned as unseaworthy and broken up in Bengal in 1815.
- Royal Edward (1864 ship) was an iron-hulled clipper launched in 1864. She sailed between England and Australia for the Red Cross Line until she was abandoned on 3 July 1886 in a sinking state.
- HMT Royal Edward was a passenger mail steamer belonging to the Canadian Northern Steamship Company that was sunk during the First World War with a large loss of life while transporting Commonwealth troops. She was launched in 1907 as Cairo for a British mail service to Egypt.
