= Lord Macartney =

Lord Macartney may refer to:

- George Macartney, 1st Earl Macartney (1737–1806)
- George Macartney (British consul) (1867–1945)
- Lord Macartney (1782 EIC ship), an East Indiaman (1782–1811)
