= Sally (1782 ship) =

British merchant, whale, and slave ship 1782–1805

History

Great Britain
- Name: Sally
- Builder: Liverpool
- Launched: 1782
- Fate: Condemned 1805

General characteristics
- Tons burthen: 459, or 500 (bm)
- Length: 113 ft 9 in (34.7 m)
- Beam: 30 ft 10 in (9.4 m)
- Complement: 1794:40; 1795:35; 1795:50
- Armament: 1782:22 × 12-pounder guns + 8 × 12-pounder guns "of the New Construction"; 1794:18 × 9-pounder guns; 1795:18 × 9-pounder guns; 1795:20 × 9-pounder guns
- Notes: Two decks & three masts

Sally was launched in 1782 at Liverpool as a West Indiaman. She made one voyage as a whaler and one as an East Indiaman sailing to Bengal under charter to the British East India Company (EIC). After a storm damaged her in 1805 as she was on her way in 1805 from Liverpool to Africa as a slave ship she had to put into Barbados where she was condemned.

== Career ==
Sally first appeared in Lloyd's Register (LR) in 1782 with J.Corning, master, changing to J.Corbett, J.Chorley & Co., owners, and trade Liverpool–Tortola.

Year	Master	Owner	Trade	Source
1783	J.Corbett; J.Woods	J.Chorley	Liverpool–Tortola	LR
1792	J.Woods; J.Meader	J.Chorley	Liverpool–Southern Fishery	LR

Whaling voyage (1791–1792): Captain John Meader sailed from Liverpool in 1791 (probably on 29 March 1791), bound for Walvis Bay. Sally returned on 19 November 1792.

After Sally returned from whaling, Captain John Woods resumed command. On 11 January 1794 Captain John Woods acquired a letter of marque. (Note: One source lists the possibility that there was a second whaling voyage, but acknowledges that it cannot conclusively identify either as a whaling or sealing voyage.)

Year	Master	Owner	Trade	Source
1794	J.Woods	J.Chorley	Liverpool–Tortola	LR; repairs 1790 and 1792

EIC voyage (1795–1796): Captain Robert Brown acquired a letter of marque on 7 August 1795. Before she sailed, Sally underwent repairs. Sally sailed from Liverpool on 7 September, bound for Bengal. She was at Rio de Janeiro on 14 November, and arrived at Calcutta on 24 February 1796. Homeward bound, she was at Culpee on 2 April, reached St Helena on 23 July and Crookhaven on 27 November, before arriving at the Downs on 12 December.

After Sally returned to England, Captain John Woods resumed command. He acquired a letter of marque on 12 January 1798.

Year	Master	Owner	Trade	Source
1797	J.Brown; J.Woods	J.Chorley	Liverpool–Bengal; Liverpool–Tortola	LR; repairs 1790, 1792, & 1795
1800	J.Woods	J.Chorley	Liverpool–Tortola	LR; repairs 1790, 1792, & 1795
1805	J.Thompson; C.Kincale	Holind & Co.	Cork; Liverpool–Africa	LR; repairs 1790, 1792, & 1795

== Fate ==
Captain Charles Kneale sailed Sally from Liverpool on 5 August 1805. The Trans Atlantic Slave Trade Database states that she was "shipwrecked or destroyed, before slaves embarked". Lloyd's List (LL) reported on 10 December that Sally, Neale, master, from Liverpool to Africa, had put into Barbados dis-masted and that she had been condemned.

Sally did not appear on the lists of vessels cleared to Africa from ports in England. In 1805, 30 British enslaving vessels were lost, five of them on the outbound leg of their voyages. During the period 1793 to 1807, war, rather than maritime hazards or resistance by the captives, was the greatest cause of vessel losses among British enslaving vessels.
