= Charles Patterson =

Charles Patterson may refer to:

- Charles B. Patterson (1854–1917), Canadian expatriate New Thought publisher, author and editor
- Charles E. Patterson (1842–1913), American lawyer and politician
- Chuck Patterson (1945–2013), American actor and director
- Charles Patterson (author), American author and historian
- Charles H. Patterson, director at Consolidated National Bank since 1902
- Charles T. Patterson (1869–1918), American racehorse trainer
- Charles Richard Patterson (1833–1910), African-American carriage manufacturer, entrepreneur and civil rights activist
