= Admiral Mann (1800 ship) =

History

Denmark
- Builder: Denmark
- Launched: 1782
- Fate: In British hands by 1799

Great Britain
- Name: Admiral Mann
- Namesake: Admiral Robert Mann
- Owner: Burridge
- Acquired: 1799
- Fate: Wrecked January 1802

General characteristics
- Tons burthen: 575 (bm)
- Propulsion: Sail
- Armament: 2 × 9-pounder + 12 × 4-pounder guns

Admiral Mann was a Danish vessel built in 1782 that came into British hands in 1799. She first appeared in Lloyd's Register in 1800, and then more legibly in 1801 (though with the name Admiral Man), with W. Tear, master, Burridge, owner, and trade Portsmouth transport. The transport Admiral Mann was among several vessels wrecked at Alexandria, Egypt, at the end of January 1802. Her entry in the Register of Shipping for 1802 is marked "Lost".

Citations
