= Crown-class ship of the line =

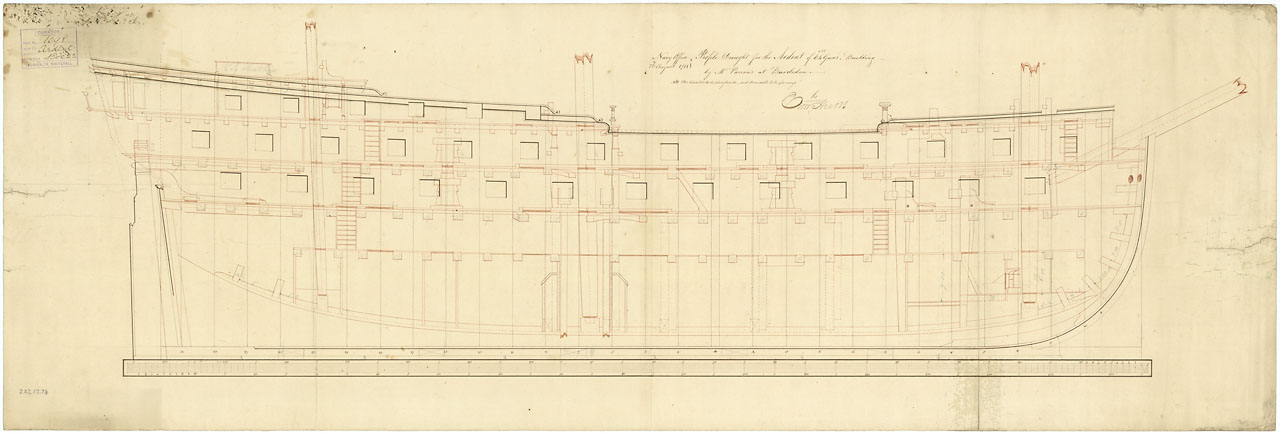
- Ardent image

Class overview
- Name: Crown
- Operators: Royal Navy
- Preceded by: Inflexible class
- Succeeded by: None
- In service: 15 March 1782 - 1816
- Completed: 3
- Lost: 1

General characteristics
- Type: Ship of the line
- Length: 160 ft 5 in (48.90 m) (gundeck); 131 ft 5 in (40.06 m) (keel)
- Beam: 44 ft 10 in (13.67 m)
- Propulsion: Sails
- Armament: 64 guns: Gundeck: 26 × 24-pounders; Upper gundeck: 26 × 18-pounders; Quarterdeck: 10 × 4-pounders; Forecastle: 2 × 9-pounders
- Notes: Ships in class include: Crown, Ardent, Scipio

The Crown-class ships of the line were a class of three 64-gun third rates, designed for the Royal Navy by Sir Edward Hunt.

== Ships ==
- HMS Crown

Builder: Perry, Blackwall Yard
Ordered: Unknown
Launched: 15 March 1782
Fate: Broken up, 1816

- HMS Ardent

Builder: Staves & Parsons, Bursledon
Ordered: 9 September 1779
Launched: 21 December 1782
Fate: Blown up, 1794

- HMS Scipio

Builder: Barnard, Deptford
Ordered: 11 November 1779
Launched: 22 October 1782
Fate: Broken up, 1798
