= HMS Crown (1782) =

Ship of the line of the Royal Navy

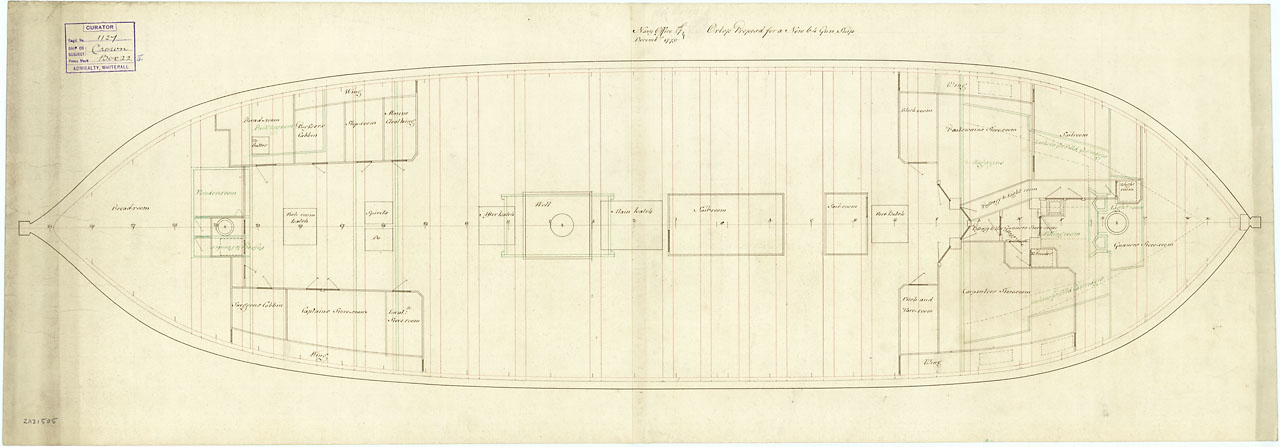
- Plan of the orlop deck of Crown

History

Great Britain
- Name: HMS Crown
- Builder: Perry, Blackwall Yard
- Laid down: September 1779
- Launched: 15 March 1782
- Fate: Broken up, 1816

General characteristics
- Class & type: Crown-class ship of the line
- Tons burthen: 1405 8/94 (bm)
- Length: 160 ft 5 in (48.90 m) (gundeck)
- Beam: 44 ft 10 in (13.67 m)
- Depth of hold: 19 ft 3.5 in (5.880 m)
- Propulsion: Sails
- Sail plan: Full-rigged ship
- Armament: 64 guns: Gundeck: 26 × 24 pdrs; Upper gundeck: 26 × 18 pdrs; Quarterdeck: 10 × 4 pdrs; Forecastle: 2 × 9 pdrs

HMS Crown was a 64-gun third-rate ship of the line of the Royal Navy, launched on 15 March 1782 at Blackwall Yard.

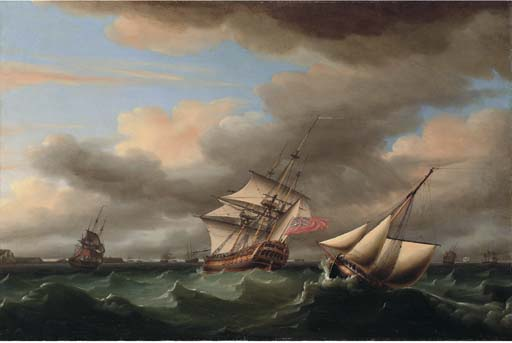
Crown and her squadron running up the Channel towards Deal where other ships of the fleet are anchored offshore, ca 1784. Thomas Whitcombe

She was converted to serve as a prison ship in 1798, and was broken up in 1816.
