= Jane (1813 Hull ship) =

British merchantman and whaler 1818–1866

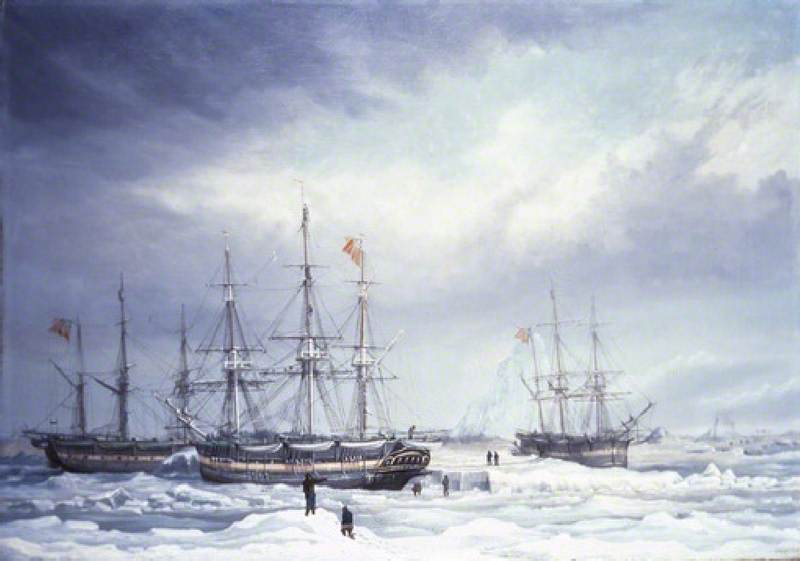
- Jane (middle vessel), Middleton, and Viewforth stuck fast in the ice. Thomas Binks (1799–1852). Maritime Museum, Hull

History

United Kingdom
- Name: Jane
- Builder: Hull
- Launched: 1813
- Fate: Wrecked 1866

General characteristics
- Tons burthen: 357, or 359 (bm)
- Length: 106 ft 7 in (32.5 m)
- Beam: 28 ft 2 in (8.6 m)
- Armament: 1813:2 × 9-pounder guns + 8 × 18-pounder carronades; 1816a:2 × 9-pounder guns + 8 × 18-pounder carronades; 1816b:2 × 9-pounder guns + 8 × 12-pounder carronades

Jane was launched at Kingston upon Hull in 1813 as a West Indiaman. Between 1818 and 1836 she was a whaler in the northern whale fishery. She then became a merchantman and was wrecked in 1866.

== West Indiaman ==
Jane entered Lloyd's Register (LR) in 1813 with John Mazon, master, Raines & Co., owners, and trade Hull–Saint Croix. As a West Indiaman she was armed with 10 cannons, though her owners reduced her armament after the end of the Napoleonic Wars. (Once she became a whaler she did not need any armament as she no longer had to fear privateers and pirates in the Caribbean.)

Year	Master	Owner	Trade	Source
1814	Mason	Raines & Co.	Hull–Saint Croix	LR
1816	Mason; Bonnifer	Rains & Co.	London–Saint Vincent; London–Jamaica	Register of Shipping

== Northern Fisheries whaler ==
From 1818 on, Jane became a whaler in the Northern Whale Fisheries, first at Greenland and then at the Davis Strait. In 1818 her captain was Sadler; in 1817 he had been captain of Aurora, whaling at Greenland.

The following data is from Coltish:

Year	Master	Where	Whales	Tuns whale oil
1818	Sadler	Greenland	1	24
1819	Sadler	Greenland	3	18
1820	Sadler	Greenland	3	25
1821	Gamblin	Greenland	1	18
1822	Maddison	Greenland	4	66
1823	Maddison	Davis Strait	23	220
1824	Maddison	Davis Strait	8	114
1825	Maddison	Davis Strait	6	76
1826	Maddison	Davis Strait	7	103
1827	Maddison	Davis Strait	16	228
1828	Maddison	Davis Strait	13	156

On 8 April 1828 Lloyd's List reported that Jane, Maddison, master, had put into Stromness leaky. Three days later it reported that she had been surveyed and had resumed her voyage.

Year	Master	Where	Whales	Tuns whale oil
1829	Maddison	Davis Strait	11	115
1830	Maddison	Davis Strait	5	91
1831	Maddison	Davis Strait	6	68
1832	Maddison	Davis Strait	26	247
1833	Maddison	Davis Strait	11	138
1834	Robinson	Davis Strait	4	21
1835	Tather	Davis Strait	1	?

On 30 September 1835, Jane, Middleton, and Viewforth were beset by ice in Davis Strait while in close proximity. On 15 November, Middleton was crushed and sank. Jane and Viewforth split Middleton's crew. In January 1835, Jane, Tather, master, got free of the ice at 58°0′N 56°40′W.

Year	Master	Where	Whales	Tuns whale oil
1836	Tather	Davis Strait	Clean	

== Merchantman ==
After having returned from the Davis Strait in 1836, without having killed a single whale (i.e., "Clean"), with whaling in the previous two years having been almost as poor, and after her overwintering in Davis Strait, her owners shifted her to the merchant trade.

Year	Master	Owner	Trade	Source & notes
1836	W.Tather; Mackenzie	Shackles & Co.	Hull–Davis Strait; Hull	LR; damages repaired 1836
1842	W.Tather	Shackless; J.Shackle	Hull–Quebec; Hull–Greenland	LR; damages repaired 1836; small repairs 1840 & 1842

In 1842 Captain W. Tather sailed Jane to Greenland again, but the voyage was not very successful. She killed one whale and 861 seals.

Year	Master	Owner	Trade	Source & notes
1845	J.Brown	J.Shackles	Hull–Greenland	LR; small repairs 1842 & 1843; damages repaired 1845
1850	W.Walker	Anderson	Hull	LR
1855	W.Walker	Anderson	Leith–"U.Stts"	LR; homeport Bo'ness
1860	W.Walker	Anderson	Leith–Mediterranean	LR; homeport Bo'ness; small repairs 1857
1865	J.Armstrong	Anderson	Leith–Baltic	LR; homeport Bo'ness; small repairs 1857 & 1862

== Fate ==
LR for 1867 had unchanged information from that for 1865, except that it carried the annotation "[wr]ecked".
