= Aurora (1782 ship) =

British merchantman and whaler 1782–1821

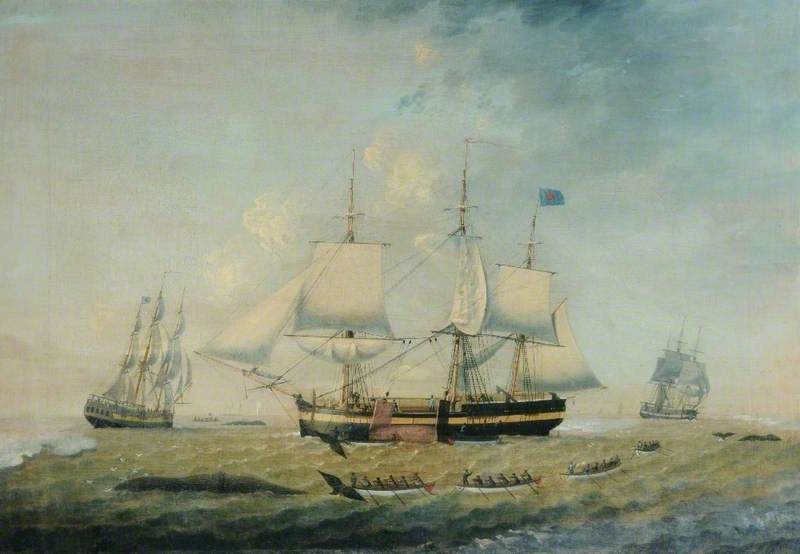
- The Greenland whaler Aurora, of Hull; Robert Willoughby, Hull Maritime Museum

History

Great Britain
- Name: Aurora
- Builder: Hull
- Launched: 1782
- Fate: Wrecked 27 August 1821

General characteristics
- Tons burthen: 366, or 370, or 470, or 500 (bm)
- Armament: 1782:4 × 3-pounder guns; 1795:6 × 6-pounder guns; 1800:8 × 6-pounder guns; 1806:10 × 9-pounder guns

Aurora was launched at Kingston upon Hull. She traded with the Baltic until 1803 when she became a Greenland whaler. She was lost in 1821 on her 18th voyage to the northern whale fishery.

== Merchantman ==
Aurora first appeared in Lloyd's Register (LR) in 1782 with Robinson, master, Hall & Co., owners, and trade Hull–Riga, changing to London transport.

Year	Master	Owner	Trade	Source & notes
1786	J.Robinson; W. Proctor	F.Hall	Narva–Hull	LR
1790	S.Lazenby	Hall & Co.	Narva–Hull	LR
1795	T.Scofield; J.Hall	F.Hall	Hull–Petersburg	LR; new deck 1792 & repairs 1793
1800	Campion	T.Hall & Co.	Hull–Petersburg	LR; damages repaired 1797

Lloyd's List (LL) reported on 20 December 1799, apparently erroneously, that Aurora, Campion, master, had been lost near Cronstadt while sailing from Petersburg to London.

== Greenland whaler ==
LR for 1803 showed Aurora with Campion, master, Hall & Co., owners, changing to Gilder, and trade Hull–Petersburg, changing to Hull–Greenland. She underwent repairs for damages in 1803, and Sadler became her master.

The following whaling data is from Lloyd's List (master and grounds), and Coltish (whale oil):

Year	Master	Where	Whales	Tuns whale oil
1803	Sadler	Greenland		182
1804	Sadler	Greenland		214
1805	Sadler	Greenland	26	244

By one account, in 1804, Captain Sadler took 44 whales that yielded only 190 butts.

In 1805, Aurora rescued the crew of Maria, of Hull, Ross, master. Maria had been lost on the "Johns-a-Main". Two of Maria's crew died in an accident to one of Aurora's boats. (Note: Maria, of Hull and of 204 tons (bm), was launched at Liverpool in 1766.) In addition to the 26 whales and 244 tons of oil, Aurora took nine tons of whale bone.

Year	Master	Where	Whales	Tuns whale oil
1806	Sadler	Greenland	12	160/400 butts

Year	Master	Owner	Trade	Source & notes
1806	A. Sadler	J. Gilder	Hull–Greenland	Register of Shipping; thorough repair 1797, new wales 1803, & good repair 1805
1807	Sadler	Greenland	28	230/570 butts

LL reported in March 1808 that Aurora had had to put back into Hull. She had been bound for Greenland but had gotten on shore. Despite the delay this caused, in 1808 Aurora had the most successful voyage of her career in terms of the amount of whale oil she gathered. It was also the ninth-best haul in the history of the Hull whaling fleet.

Year	Master	Where	Whales	Tuns whale oil
1808	Sadler	Greenland	38	263/700 butts
1809	Sadler	Greenland		180
1810	Sadler	Greenland	13	146/366 butts

In the 1810 season, Aurora, Sadler, master, was the most successful whaler from Greenland.

Year	Master	Where	Whales	Tuns whale oil
1811	Sadler	Greenland	39	250/630 butts
1812	Sadler	Greenland	22 or 24	156, or 210
1813	Sadler	Greenland	2	20
1814	Sadler	Greenland	24	189

In 1813, Aurora, Sadler, master, had been beset by ice from the middle of April to early July.

LL reported that Aurora, Sadler, master, had had to put into Aberdeen on 20 April 1815 leaky. She had been bound for Greenland and had gotten as far as latitude 63°N before she had had to put back. She finally sailed at the end of April.

Year	Master	Where	Whales	Tuns whale oil
1815	Sadler	Greenland	6	69
1816	Sadler	Greenland	12	76
1817	Sadler	Greenland	5	70

In 1818 Sadler became master of Jane, sailing her to Greenland.

Year	Master	Where	Whales	Tuns whale oil
1818	Griswood	Greenland	7	95
1819	Griswood	Greenland	1	19
1820	Thomas	Greenland	9	80
1821		Davis Strait	9	

The first week of June 1820, saw heavy ice. Aurora had to saw a dock in ice 12' thick.

== Fate ==
Aurora, of Hull, Thomas, master, was lost on 27 August 1821 at Davis Strait. At the time of her loss she had taken 10 fish. Aurora was one of 11 ships sunk during the 1821 season. She was on her first voyage to Davis Strait.
