= Charles Paterson (cricketer) =

Scottish cricketer

Personal information
- Full name: Charles Strathern Paterson
- Born: 18 October 1882; Edinburgh, Midlothian, Scotland
- Died: 23 July 1973 (aged 90); Edinburgh, Midlothian, Scotland
- Batting: Right-handed
- Bowling: Right-arm medium

Domestic team information
- Years: Team
- 1913–1927: Scotland

Career statistics
Competition	First-class
Matches	7
Runs scored	188
Batting average	26.85
100s/50s	–/–
Top score	49
Balls bowled	814
Wickets	10
Bowling average	24.40
5 wickets in innings	–
10 wickets in match	–
Best bowling	4/33
Catches/stumpings	2/–
- Source: Cricinfo, 14 July 2022

Charles Strathern Paterson (18 November 1882 – 23 July 1973) was a Scottish first-class cricketer.

Paterson was born in November 1882 at Edinburgh. A club cricketer for both Carlton and Grange Cricket Club's, he made his debut for Scotland in first-class cricket against Ireland at Edinburgh in 1913, with him appearing in the same fixture played at Dublin the following year. Paterson served in the British Army during the First World War, being commissioned as a second lieutenant in the Royal Scots in January 1917. He resigned his commission following the war in September 1920, at which point he held the rank of lieutenant; upon his resignation he was granted the honorary rank of captain.

Paterson resumed playing first-class cricket for Scotland in 1924, appearing in two matches that year against Ireland and Wales. He made three further first-class appearances between 1925 and 1927, playing twice against Ireland and once against Lancashire. As a lower order batsman in the Scottish side, he scored 188 runs at an average of 26.85, with a highest score of 49. As a right-arm medium pace bowler, he took 10 wickets at a bowling average of 24.40, with best figures of 4 for 33. Outside of cricket, Paterson was a manager in the insurance industry. He died at Edinburgh in July 1973.
