= HMS Scipio (1782) =

Ship of the line of the Royal Navy

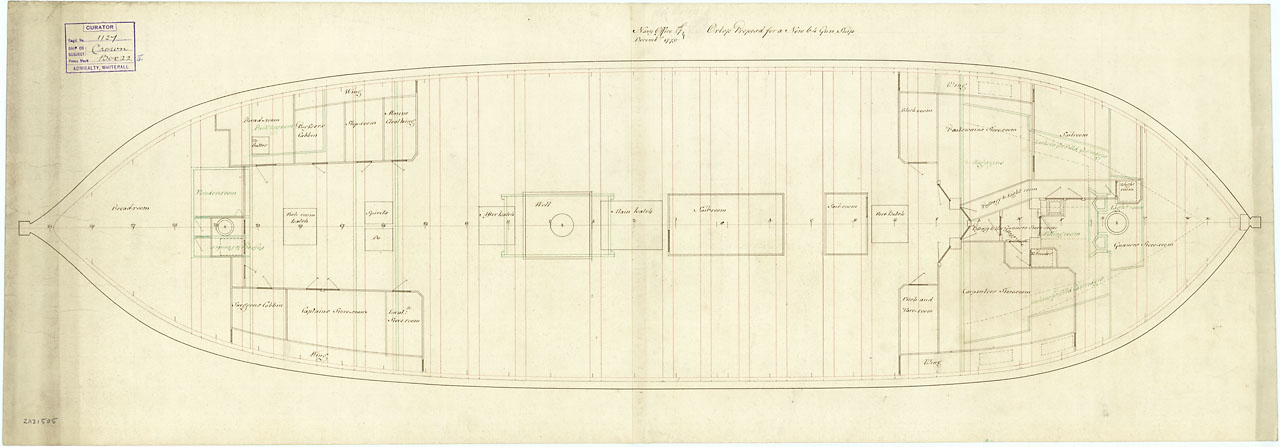
- Plan of the orlop deck of Scipio

History

Great Britain
- Name: HMS Scipio
- Ordered: 11 November 1779
- Builder: Barnard, Deptford
- Laid down: January 1780
- Launched: 22 October 1782
- Fate: Broken up, 1798

General characteristics
- Class & type: 64-gun third-rate Crown-class ship of the line
- Tons burthen: 1387 (bm)
- Length: 160 ft 5 in (48.90 m) (gundeck)
- Beam: 44 ft 10 in (13.67 m)
- Depth of hold: 19 ft 3.5 in (5.880 m)
- Propulsion: Sails
- Sail plan: Full-rigged ship
- Armament: Gundeck: 26 × 24-pounder guns; Upper gundeck: 26 × 18-pounder guns; QD: 10 × 4-pounder guns; Fc: 2 × 9-pounder guns

HMS Scipio was a 64-gun third rate ship of the line of the Royal Navy, launched on 22 October 1782 at Deptford. She was broken up in 1798.

Notable people who sailed on her include Matthew Flinders, Francis Laforey, John Nicholson Inglefield and Edward Thornbrough.
