= HMS Ardent (1782) =

British ship of the line (1782–1794)

- Plan of Ardent

History

Great Britain
- Name: HMS Ardent
- Ordered: 9 September 1779
- Builder: Staves & Parsons, Bursledon
- Laid down: October 1780
- Launched: 21 December 1782
- Fate: Blown up, 1794

General characteristics
- Class & type: Crown-class ship of the line
- Type: Third rate
- Tons burthen: 1387 (bm)
- Length: 160 ft 5 in (48.9 m) (gundeck)
- Beam: 44 ft 10 in (13.7 m)
- Depth of hold: 19 ft 3 1/2 in (5.9 m)
- Propulsion: Sails
- Sail plan: Full-rigged ship
- Armament: Gun deck: 26 × 24-pounder guns; Upper gun deck: 26 × 18-pounder guns; QD: 10 × 4-pounder guns; Fc: 2 × 9-pounder guns

HMS Ardent was a Royal Navy 64-gun third rate. This ship of the line was launched on 21 December 1782 at Bursledon, Hampshire. She disappeared in 1794, believed lost to a fire and explosion.

== Career ==
In 1784 she was under the command of Captain Harry Harmood, serving as a guard ship at Portsmouth.

In 1793 she was under the command of Captain Robert Manners Sutton, sailing with Vice-Admiral Lord Hood at Toulon in August. She was part of a force detached under Robert Linzee to take part in the attack on Corsica in September.

== Fate ==
In April 1794 Ardent was stationed off the harbour of Villa Franca, to watch two French frigates. It is presumed that she caught fire and blew up. Berwick encountered some wreckage while cruising in the Gulf of Genoa in the summer that suggested fire and an explosion. A part of Ardent's quarterdeck with some gunlocks deeply embedded in it was found floating in the area, as was splinter netting driven into planking. No trace was ever found of her crew of 500.

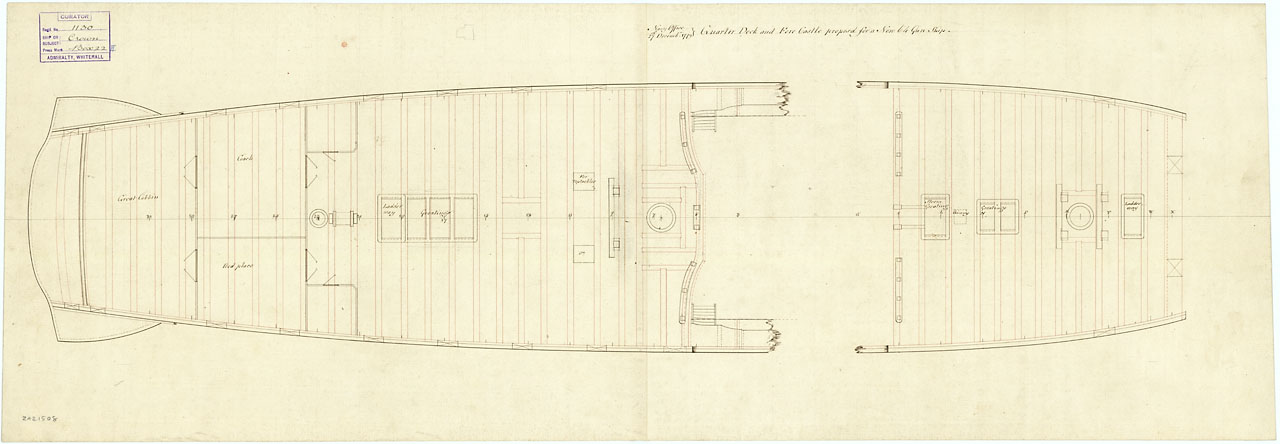
Plan showing the quarterdeck and forecastle of Ardent

== See also ==
- List of people who disappeared mysteriously at sea
