= Pégase-class ship of the line =

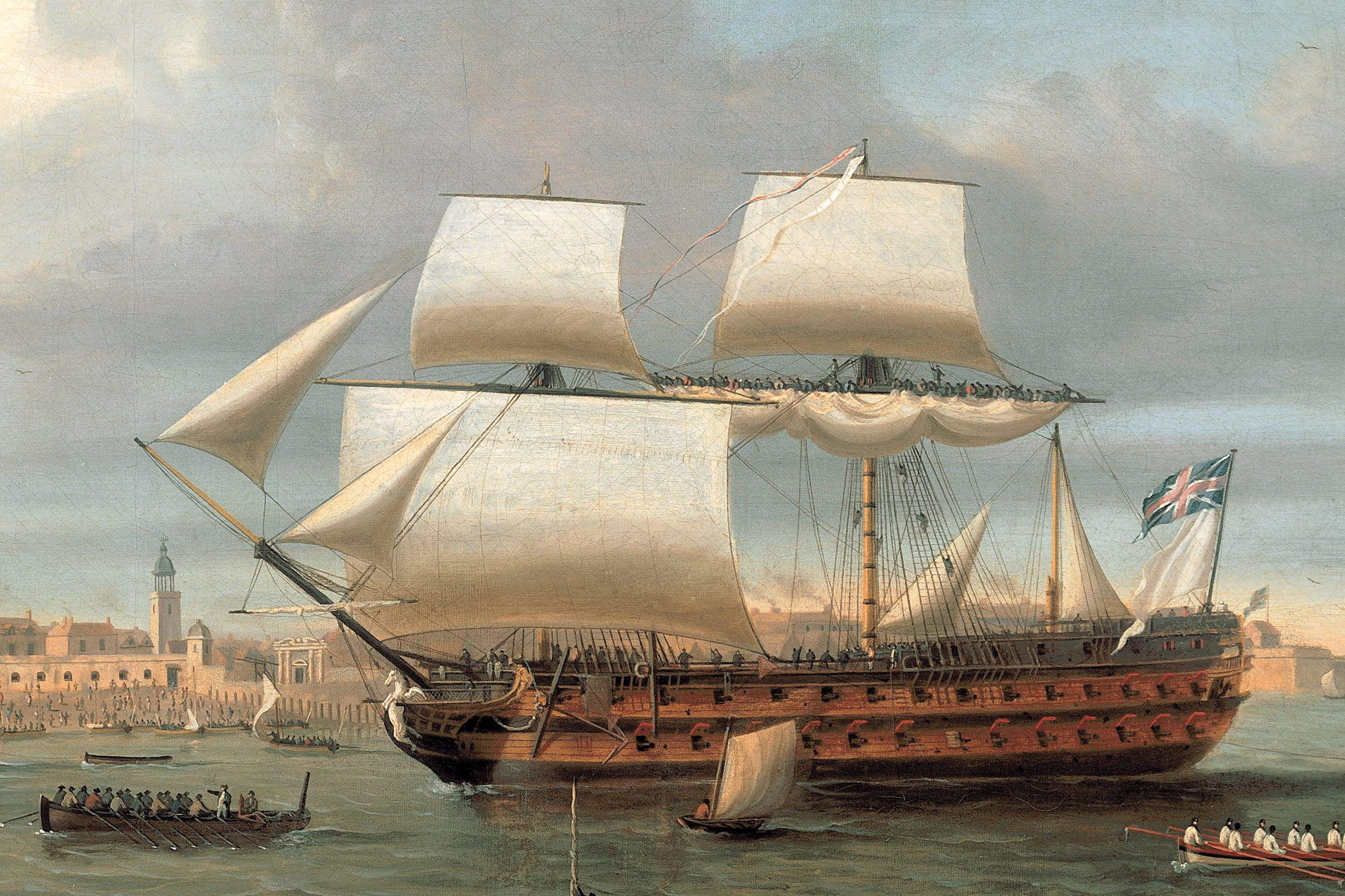
- Pégase entering Portsmouth Harbour in 1782

Class overview
- Name: Pégase
- Operators: French Navy; Royal Navy
- Completed: 6

General characteristics
- Class & type: Pégase class
- Displacement: 3,000 tonneaux
- Tons burthen: 1,515 port tonneaux
- Length: 55.2 metres
- Beam: 14.3 metres
- Draught: 6.8 metres
- Propulsion: Sails
- Armament: 74 to 78 guns of various weights of shot; 28 36-pounder long guns

The Pégase class was a class of 74-gun ships of the French Navy, built to a common design by naval constructor Antoine Groignard. It comprised six ships, all ordered during 1781 and all named on 13 July 1781.

The name-ship of the class - Pégase - was captured by the British Navy just two months after her completion; the other five ships were all at Toulon in August 1793 when that port was handed over by French Royalists to the occupying Anglo-Spanish forces, and they were seized by the British Navy. When French Republican forces forced the evacuation of the Allies in December, the Puissant was sailed to England (and - like the Pégase - was used as a harbour hulk there until the end of the Napoleonic Wars), and the Liberté (ex-Dictateur) and Suffisant were destroyed during the evacuation of the port; the remaining pair were recovered by the French Navy - see their respective individual histories below.

== Ships ==
- Pégase

Builder: Brest Dockyard
Ordered: June 1781
Begun: June 1781
Launched: 5 October 1781
Completed: February 1782
Fate: Captured by HMS Foudroyant in the Bay of Biscay on 21 April 1782 (with 80 men of her crew killed); renamed HMS Pegase; hulked 1794 at Plymouth, until broken up in 1815.

- Puissant

Builder: Lorient Dockyard
Ordered: 13 July 1781
Begun: August 1781
Launched: 13 March 1782
Completed: June 1782
Fate: Surrendered to the British by her Royalist crew during the siege of Toulon on 29 August 1793; removed to England at the evacuation of the city; became a hulk in Portsmouth 1796; broken up in 1816.

- Dictateur

Builder: Toulon Dockyard
Ordered: 13 July 1781
Begun: July 1781
Launched: 16 February 1782
Completed: August 1782
Fate: Renamed Liberté on 29 September 1792. Burnt at the end of the siege of Toulon on 18 December 1793. Raised in 1805 and scrapped in 1808.

- Suffisant

Builder: Toulon Dockyard
Ordered: 13 July 1781
Begun: July 1781
Launched: 6 March 1782
Completed: August 1782
Fate: Burnt at the end of the siege of Toulon 18 December 1793. Raised in 1805 and scrapped in 1806.

- Alcide

Builder: Rochefort Dockyard
Ordered: 13 July 1781
Begun: July 1781
Launched: 25 May 1782
Completed: January 1783
Fate: Burnt during the Battle of the Hyères Islands on 18 July 1795 by her own heated shots, and exploded.

- Censeur

Builder: Rochefort Dockyard
Ordered: 13 July 1781
Begun: August 1781
Launched: 24 July 1782
Completed: October 1783
Fate: Captured by the British at the Battle of Genoa 14 March 1795; retaken in the Battle of the Levant Convoy by de Richery's squadron off Cape St Vincent; sold at Cadiz to Spain in June 1799 in exchange for the Spanish San Sebastián.
