= Royal Edward (1796 ship) =

History

France
- Name: Alexandre
- Launched: 1782
- Captured: c.1795

Great Britain
- Name: Royal Edward
- Owner: Various
- Acquired: c.1796 by purchase of a prize
- Fate: Condemned and broken up in 1815

General characteristics
- Tons burthen: 35131/94, or 367, or 369, or 375(bm)
- Complement: 1809:24; 1812:14
- Armament: 1798:2 × 6-pounder + 4 × 4-pounder guns + 6 × 12-pounder carronades; 1809:14 × 9-pounder guns; 1812:10 × 9-pounder guns + 2 × 6-pounder carronades

Royal Edward was launched in 1782 in France as Alexandre. The British captured her c.1796, and new owners changed her name. She then sailed for a few years as a West Indiaman before completing four voyages as a slave ship in the triangular trade in enslaved people. She returned to the West India trade after leaving enslaving, and then traded more generally. She was condemned as unseaworthy and broken up in Bengal in 1815.

== Career ==
=== French origins ===
Royal Edward was launched in 1782, in France, as Alexandre. She was reportedly a prize to HMS Hussar. (Note: The only mention in the London Gazette of the capture of a contemporary Alexandre is in an account by Sir Richard Strachan, of HMS Melampus of his squadron's capture on 5 May 1795 of a convoy. The largest vessel in the convoy was Alexandre, of 397 tons (bm), which was carrying ship timber, cordage, hemp, and cannon. Hussar was not part of the British squadron.)

Alexandre was condemned in Prize Court and sold. New owners then renamed her. Though volumes of Lloyd's Register and the Register of Shipping gave a capture year of 1796, she did not enter Lloyd's Register before 1798. She sailed as a West Indiaman before entering enslaving.

Year	Master	Owner	Trade	Notes & source
1798	J.Burn	Hart	London–Jamaica	French prize; Lloyd's Register (LR)
1799	J.Burn; T.Bushell	Hart	London–Jamaica; Liverpool–Africa	LR
1800	T. Bushell	Hodgson	Liverpool–Africa	LR

=== Enslaving ===
1st enslaving voyage (1799-1800): Captain Thomas Bushell sailed from England on 4 September 1799. (Note: This was Captain Bushell's seventh enslaving voyage, and his third as master of a vessel.) Royal Edward acquired her captives at Bonny Island, and arrived at Kingston, Jamaica on 14 July 1800, with 396. Royal Edward left Jamaica on 18 October and arrived back at Liverpool on 23 December. She had a crew of 44 men, of whom 15 died on the voyage.

2nd enslaving voyage (1801-1802): Captain John Griffiths sailed from Liverpool on 24 June 1801. He acquired captives at Calabar, and delivered them to St Croix, Danish West Indies, on 3 May 1802, with 280 captives. Royal Edward left St Croix on 2 July, and arrived back at Liverpool on 4 August.

At the time Saint Croix was a Danish colony. In 1792, the Danish government passed a law that would outlaw Danish participation in the trans-Atlantic enslaving trade, from early 1803 on. This led the government in the Danish West Indies to encourage the importation of captives prior to the ban taking effect. One measure that it took was to open the trade to foreign vessels. Records for the period 1796 to 1799 show that 24 British enslaving ships, most of them from Liverpool, arrived at St Croix and imported 6,781 captives.

Royal Edward underwent a "good repair" in 1805.

3rd enslaving voyage (1805-1806): Captain Thomas Jump sailed from England on 27 September 1805. He died on 9 January 1806. Captain George Forster replaced Jump. It is not clear where he gathered his captives. He arrived at Trinidad on 12 April 1806. Royal Edward left Trinidad on 10 July and arrived back in England on 13 August. She had a crew of 47 men, four of whom died on the voyage.

4th enslaving voyage (1806-1809): Captain Richard Burrows sailed from Liverpool on 28 October 1806. He gathered his captives at Calabar, and arrived at Suriname on 3 October 1808, with 316. Royal Edward arrived back at Liverpool on 15 February 1809. She had a crew of 41 men, and lost eight on the voyage. The Slave Trade Act 1807 forbade British vessels from engaging in enslaving; because Royal Edward had left the United Kingdom well before the 1 May 1807 deadline, her fourth voyage remained legal.

Lloyd's List for 1809 shows Royal Edward's master changing from R. Burrows to J. Clint. There was no change in ownership, or trade, which was still Liverpool–Africa. Captain John Clint acquired a letter of marque on 24 July 1809.

The 1810 volume of Lloyd's Register showed Royal Edward with Clint, master, Mullion, owner, and trade London–Havana. In 1811 her master changed to Wilson, and her trade to London–West Indies. The next year shows her owner as Donaldson. There is no change in her trade, but her entry carried the notation "condemned".

Lloyd's Register for 1813 shows Royal Edward's master as J. Boyd, her owner as I. Cooper, and her trade London–St Ubes. Captain James Boyd acquired a letter of marque on 19 March 1812. On 31 May 1812 Boyd had to put back into Lisbon as Royal Edward was leaky. She had started out for England.

== Fate ==
In 1814, the British East India Company (EIC) lost its monopoly on trade with India and South East Asia, though it retained its monopoly on trade with China. Thereafter British vessels could sail to India under a license from the EIC.

Lloyd's Register for 1816, showed Royal Edward with E. Burford, master, I. Cooper, owner, and trade London–Île de France.

Royal Edward, Balston, master, arrived at Calcutta from Île de France in late August 1815. She was surveyed at Calcutta, condemned as unseaworthy, and was sold for breaking up.
