= Lord Macartney (1782 EIC ship) =

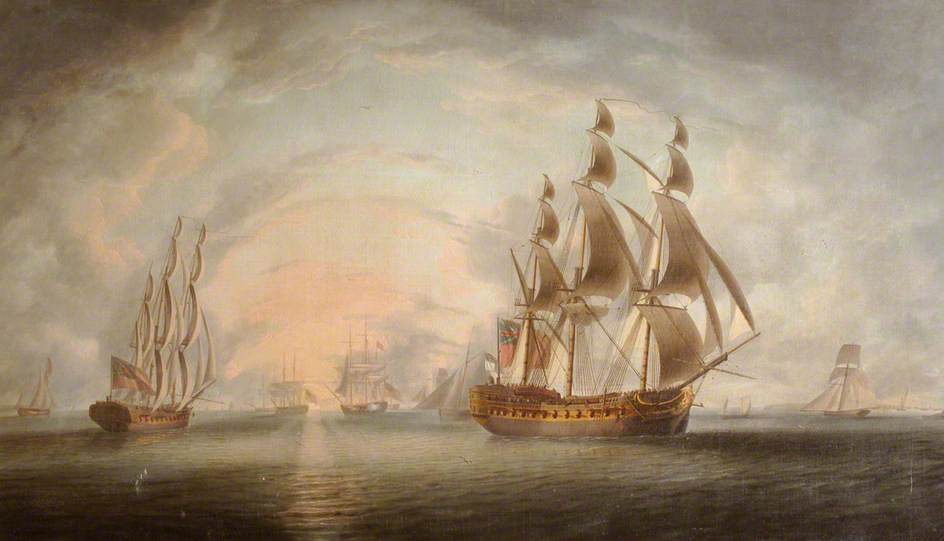
- Lord Macartney entering the River Thames

History
- Name: Lord Macartney
- Namesake: George Macartney, 1st Earl Macartney
- Owner: EIC voyages:Robert Preston; 1799:Hunter & co.
- Builder: Perry, Blackwall
- Launched: 5 October 1782
- Fate: Last listed 1811

General characteristics
- Tons burthen: 755, or 769, or 796 (bm)
- Propulsion: Sail
- Complement: 105 (1794)
- Armament: 1794:26 × 12&9-pounder guns; 1799:20 × 12-pounder + 6 × 6-pounder guns
- Notes: Three decks

Lord Macartney was launched in 1782 as an East Indiaman. She made six voyages for the British East India Company (EIC0 before she was sold in 1798. She then traded across the Atlantic to North America and was last listed in 1811.

== EIC voyages ==
EIC voyage #1 (1783–1784): Captain William Hall sailed from Portsmouth on 11 March 1783, bound for Madras and Bengal. Lord Macartney reached Johanna on 19 June and Madras on 22 July. She arrived at Kedgeree on 13 September. She was among several chartered ships reported on 23 October 1783 as being detained at Bengal. Four would sail on 10 November, and the remaining 10, including Lord Macartney, after that.

Homeward bound, she reached St Helena on 17 June 1784 and arrived at The Downs on 14 September.

EIC voyage #2 (1785–1786): Captain James Way (or Hay) sailed from The Downs on 13 April 1784, bound for China. Lord Macartney arrived at Whampoa anchorage on 17 November. Homeward bound, she crossed the Second Bar on 20 February 1786 and was at Bantam on 6 April. She reached St Helena on 27 June and arrived at The Downs on 31 August.

EIC voyage #3 (1788–1790): Captain Hay sailed from The Downs on 4 April 1788, bound for Madras, Bengal, Bombay, and China. Lord Macartney was at Madeira on 15 April and Johanna on 19 July. She reached Madras on 15 August and arrived at Diamond Harbour on 28 August. She was at Bencoolen on 27 March 1789 and arrived at Bombay on 29 May. She arrived at Whampoa on 20 September. Homeward bound, she crossed the Second Bar on 17 December, reached St Helena on 11 March 1790, and arrived at The Downs on 23 May.

EIC voyage #4 (1792–1790): Captain Hays sailed from the Downs on 17 January 1792 bound for Madras and China. Lord Macartney reached Madras on 10 June, Penang on 30 July, and Malacca on 30 August. She arrived at Whampoa on 27 September. Homeward bound, she crossed the Second Bar on 1 January 1793, reached St Helena on 31 March 1790, and arrived at The Downs on 16 June.

EIC voyage #5 (1794–1795): War with France had broken out in 1793 and Captain Hays acquired a letter of marque on 22 February 1794. Lord Hawkesbury was one of 39 Indiamen that the British government held back for a planned attack on Mauritius, later canceled. (The Government would pay £1,292 for 62 days' demurrage, including 22 days at Spithead.)

Captain Hay sailed from Portsmouth on 2 May, bound for Madras and China. Lord Macartney reached Madras on 7 September. She reached Penang on 5 October and Malacca on 15 October, and arrived at Whampoa on 8 January 1795. Homeward bound, she crossed the Second Bar on 9 March, reached Malacca on 26 April and St Helena on 24 August, and arrived at The Downs on 25 November.

EIC voyage #6 (1796–1798): Captain Hay sailed from Portsmouth on 12 April 1796, bound for Madras and Bengal. Lord Macartney was at Simon's Bay on 21 July and reached Madras on 16 November. She visited Trincomalee on 20 December and returned to Madras on 4 January 1797. She arrived at Calcutta on 14 February.

The British government chartered Lord Macartney, together with numerous other Indiamen and country ships, to serve as a transport in a planned attack on Manila. Lord Macartney was at Kedgeree on 2 August, Saugor on 19 December, and Madras again on 11 January 1798.

When the British Government cancelled the invasion following a peace treaty with Spain, it released the vessels it had engaged. Homeward bound, Lord Macartney was at the Cape of Good Hope on 22 April. She reached St Helena on 26 May and arrived at The Downs on 2 August.

The EIC charged the British government some £4521 for demurrage for the 217 days delay to Lord Camden's original voyage.

== Later career and fate ==
In 1798 Lord Macartney was sold to Hunter & Co., London. She underwent a good repair that year. By one report, Hunter & Co. placed her in the timber trade on a regular run to Halifax, Nova Scotia. She appeared n Lloyd's Register in 1799 with Robertson, master, Hunter & Co., owner, and trade London–Halifax.

Lloyd's List reported on 9 March 1802 that Lord Macartney, Mackie, master, had been sailing from New Brunswick to England when she became leaky. She therefore put into Halifax, Nova Scotia.

She is last listed in the Register of Shipping in 1811 with Gilchrist, master, Hunter & Co., owner, and trade Greenock–"Wscas" (probably Wiscasset, Maine).
