= French ship Puissant =

Ship of the line of the French Navy

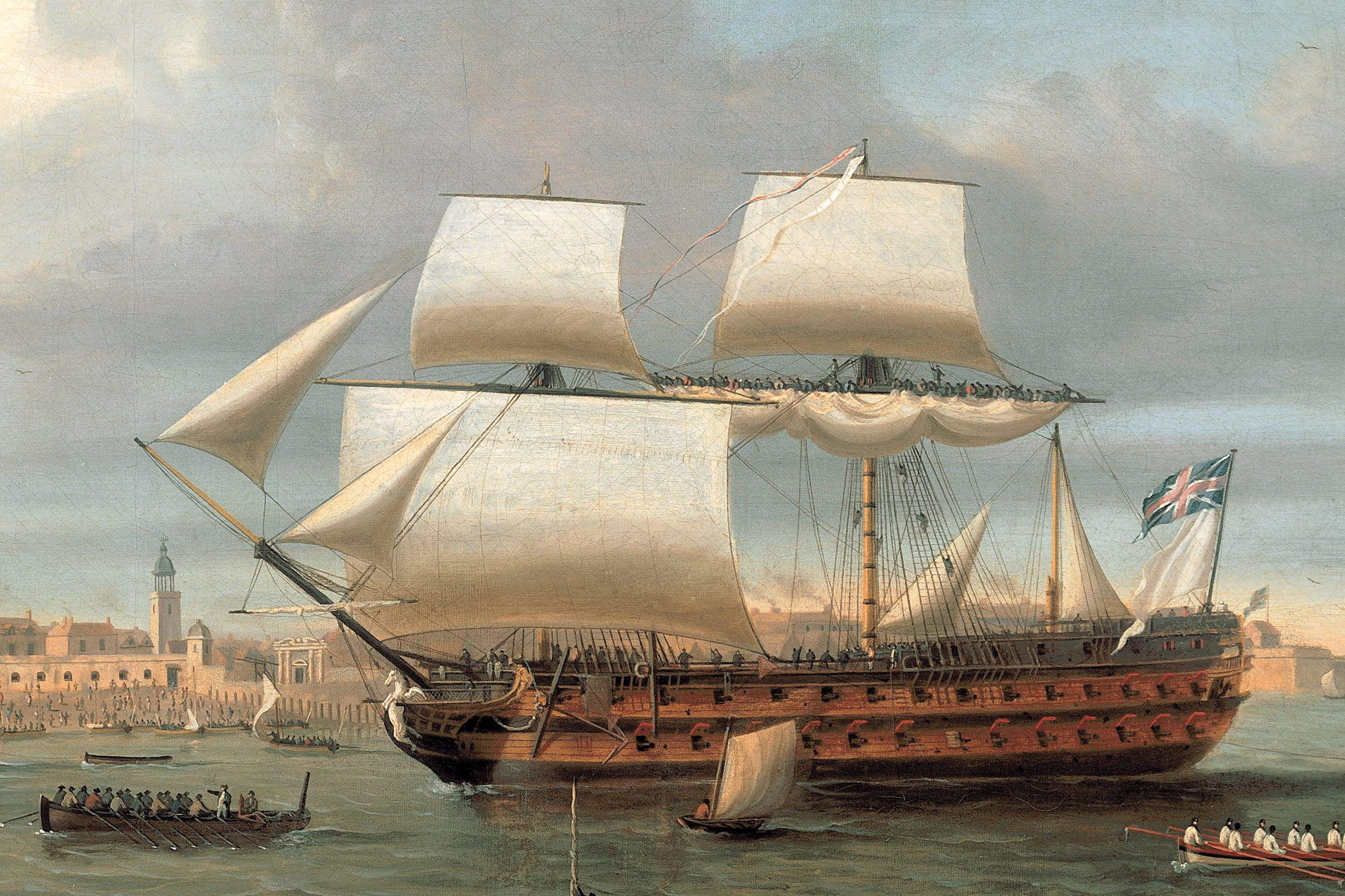
- Puissant's sister ship Pégase entering Portsmouth Harbour in 1782

History

France
- Name: Puissant
- Builder: Lorient
- Laid down: August 1781
- Launched: 13 March 1782
- Fate: Surrendered to Britain, 29 August 1793 at Toulon

Great Britain
- Name: Puissant
- Acquired: 29 August 1793 by surrender
- Fate: Sold 1816

General characteristics
- Class & type: Pégase-class ship of the line
- Displacement: 3,000 tonneaux
- Tons burthen: 1,515 port tonneaux; 1,79949/94 (bm)
- Length: 178 ft 9 in (54.48 m) (overall); 146 ft 5 1/2 in (44.641 m) (keel)
- Beam: 48 ft 0 3/4 in (14.649 m)
- Depth of hold: 21 ft 4 in (6.50 m)
- Propulsion: Sails
- Armament: French service: Lower deck: 28 × 36-pounder guns; Upper deck: 28 × 18-pounder guns; QD: 14 × 8-pounder guns; Fc: 4 × 8-pounder guns; British service: Not armed

Puissant was built in 1781–1782, to a design by Antoine Groignard as a Pégase-class 74-gun ship of the line. Her captain handed her over to the British at Toulon on 29 August 1793. She arrived at Portsmouth on 3 May 1794. She then remained there as an unarmed receiving ship, sheer hulk, and flagship until her sale in 1816.

== British career ==
On 28 August 1793, Admiral Lord Hood of the Royal Navy and Admiral Juan de Lángara of the Spanish Navy, committed a force of 13,000 British, Spanish, Neapolitan and Piedmontese troops to the French royalists' cause at Toulon. The next day, the royalists handed over a number of their vessels to the British.

Puissant was under the command of Mon. Ferrand. After her hand-over to British control she spent several weeks laying opposite and firing on a shore battery of 24-pounders at the head of La Seine in Toulon harbor. She then sailed to Portsmouth, arriving there on 3 May 1794. The British government awarded Ferrand a pension of £200 per annum for his services.

In February and March 1796, Puissant was fitted as a receiving ship (at a cost of £10,044) and was commissioned in April, under Commander David Hotchkiss. From March 1798, she was under the command of Lieutenant R. Allen, in March 1799, under Lieutenant J. Baker, and then between October 1799 and 1801, under Commander William Syme.

In 1803, Lieutenant James Bowen recommissioned her as a receiving ship. Later that year she became a sheer hulk.

Captain Robert Hall assumed command in 1809. Later that same year James Nehemiah Taylor, surgeon of HMS Jamaica, was held prisoner on board Puissant while awaiting execution for the crime of buggery. The sentence was carried out shortly before 11 o’clock on 30 December 1809, on board HMS Jamaica.

Commander James Irwin replaced Captain Hall in April 1810, who moved to HMS Royal William. Captain Charles William Paterson succeeded Irwin in 1811, and remained in command until 12 August 1812. In September 1812, Captain Benjamin William Page became captain of Puissant and she served as the flagship for Admiral Sir Richard Bickerton. She was paid off (decommissioned) in October 1815, and sold on 11 July 1816, for £2,250 to be broken up.

== Prize-money ==
Although Puissant was unarmed and confined to port, her crew did earn prize money on three occasions. On 26 October 1807, Tsar Alexander I of Russia declared war on Great Britain. The official news did not arrive there until 2 December, at which time the British declared an embargo on all Russian vessels in British ports. Puissant was one of some 70 vessels that shared in the seizure of the 44-gun Russian frigate Speshnoy (Speshnyy), then in Portsmouth harbour. The British seized the Russian storeship Wilhelmina (Vilghemina) at the same time. The Russian vessels were carrying the payroll for Vice-Admiral Dmitry Senyavin’s squadron in the Mediterranean. (Note: An able seaman on any one of the 70 British vessels received 14s 7½d in prize money.)

Then on 27 August 1808, Puissant and the "armed cutter" Linnet shared in the detention of the Danish ship Deodaris. At the time, Linnet may have been acting as a tender to Puissant.

Lastly, when news of the outbreak of the War of 1812, reached Britain, the Royal Navy seized all American vessels then in British ports. Puissant was among the Royal Navy vessels then lying at Spithead or Portsmouth and so entitled to share in the grant for the American ships Belleville, Janus, Aeos, Ganges, and Leonidas seized there on 31 July 1812. (Note: A first-class share was worth £20 19s 0d; a sixth-class share, that of an ordinary seaman, was worth 4s 1d; the Commander in Chief received £230 10s 8d.)

== Fate ==
Puissant was paid off in October 1815. She was then sold on 11 July 1816, for £2,250.

== See also ==
- List of ships captured in the 18th century
