= Charles William Paterson =

Royal Navy officer (1765–1841)

Admiral Charles William Paterson
- Born: 1765; Berwick
- Died: 10 March 1841 (aged 75–76)

Charles William Paterson (1765 – 10 March 1841) was a Royal Navy officer.

== Biography ==
Paterson was the son of James Paterson, a captain in the 69th regiment. He was born at Berwick in 1756. In 1765 his name was put on the books of the Shannon at Portsmouth, and in 1768 on those of the St. Antonio. His actual entry into the navy was probably in 1769, when he joined the Phœnix going out to the Guinea coast, with the broad pennant of his maternal uncle, Commodore George Anthony Tonyn. He afterwards served on the home and Newfoundland stations; in 1776 was in the Eagle, Lord Howe's flagship, on the coast of North America, and in 1777 was promoted by Howe to be lieutenant of the Stromboli, from which he was moved the next year to the Brune. In June 1779 he joined the Ardent, a 64-gun ship, which, on 17 Aug., was captured off Plymouth by the combined Franco-Spanish fleet. In April 1780 he was appointed to the Alcide of 74 guns, which joined Rodney in the West Indies in May; went to New York with him during the summer; returned to the West Indies in November, and in the following January was present at the reduction of St. Eustatius and the other Dutch islands. In February 1781 Paterson joined the Sandwich, Rodney's flagship; went home with the admiral in the Gibraltar, and returned to the West Indies with him in the Formidable. On arriving on the station in the end of February, he was appointed acting-captain of the St. Eustatius, armed ship, and on 8 April was promoted to command the Blast, in which he returned to England on the conclusion of the peace.

In 1793 Paterson was appointed to the Gorgon, in which he went out to the Mediterranean, where, on 20 January 1794, he was posted to the Ariadne. On the reduction of Corsica he was moved into the Melpomene, and returned to England in 1795. In 1797 he was inspecting captain of the quota men in Kircudbright and Wigtownshire, and in 1798 superintended the fitting of the Admiral de Vries, till she was turned over to the transport board. In 1800 he commanded the Montagu in the Channel, and in 1801–2 the San Fiorenzo. In 1810 he had charge of the French prisoners of war in Portchester Castle, Hampshire and in 1811–12 commanded the Puissant guardship at Spithead. He was promoted to be rear-admiral on 12 August 1812, vice-admiral 12 August 1819, and admiral 10 Jan. 1837, but had no further service, and died on 10 March 1841. On 28 December 1799 he married Jane Ellen, daughter of his first cousin, David Yeats, formerly registrar of East Florida.
