= French ship Alcide (1782) =

Ship of the line of the French Navy

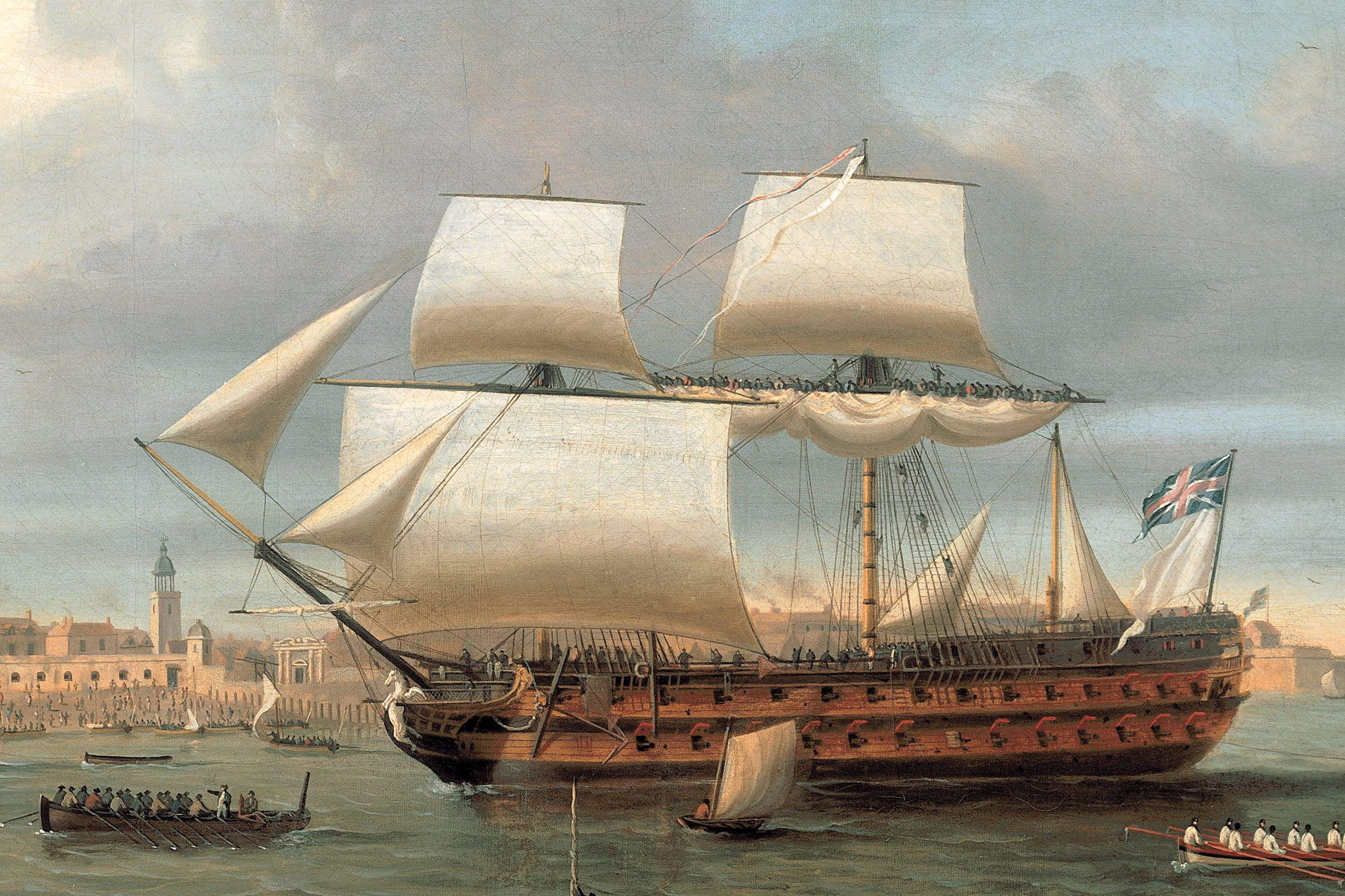
- Alcide's sister ship Pégase

History

France
- Name: Alcide
- Builder: Rochefort
- Laid down: July 1781
- Launched: 25 May 1782
- In service: January 1783
- Fate: Destroyed at the Battle of Hyères

General characteristics
- Class & type: 74-gun Pégase-class ship of the line
- Displacement: 3,000 tonneaux
- Tons burthen: 1,515 port tonneaux
- Length: 55.2 m (181 ft)
- Beam: 14.3 m (47 ft)
- Draught: 6.8 m (22 ft)
- Propulsion: Sails
- Sail plan: Full-rigged ship
- Complement: 600
- Armament: 74 guns of various weights of shot, later upgraded to 78

Alcide was a 74-gun Pégase-class ship of the line of the French Navy, launched in 1782. She served in the French fleet under François Joseph Paul de Grasse during the American Revolutionary War. During the French Revolutionary Wars Alcide took part in the Battle of the Hyères Islands, under Captain Le Blond Saint-Hilaire. She was the last ship of the French rear when she was becalmed and had to fight HMS Victory, Culloden, and Cumberland. Alcide damaged the rigging of Culloden, but was quickly battered by her overwhelmingly superior opponents. She surrendered to Cumberland at 2h. The French frigates Justice and Alceste attempted to take her in tow to safety, but were repelled by gunfire from Victory. Soon thereafter, a fire broke out, reportedly in her tops or by her own heated shots. She exploded 30 minutes afterwards with the loss of 300 men, including Saint-Hilaire.
