= French ship Pégase (1781) =

Ship of the line of the French Navy

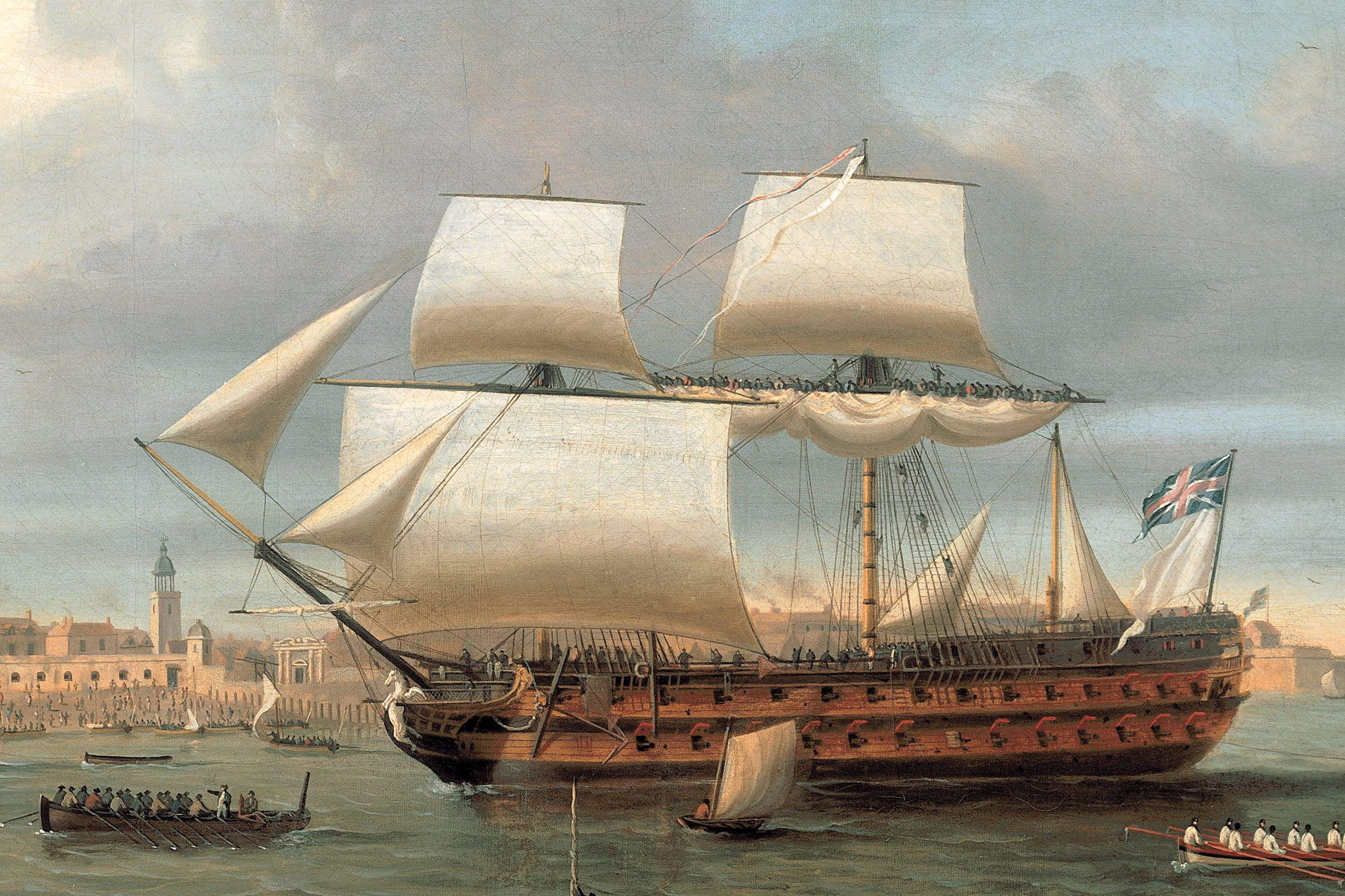
- Pégase entering Portsmouth Harbour on 30 April 1782

History

France
- Name: Pégase
- Launched: 5 October 1781
- Captured: 21 April 1782, by Royal Navy

Great Britain
- Name: Pegase
- Acquired: 21 April 1782
- Fate: Broken up, 1815

General characteristics
- Class & type: 74-gun Pégase-class ship of the line
- Displacement: 3,000 tonneaux
- Tons burthen: 1,515 port tonneaux
- Length: 55.2 m (181 ft 1 in)
- Beam: 14.3 m (46 ft 11 in)
- Draught: 6.8 m (22 ft 4 in)
- Propulsion: Sails
- Sail plan: Full-rigged ship
- Complement: 600
- Armament: 74 guns of various weights of shot, later upgraded to 78

Pégase was a 74-gun Pégase-class ship of the line of the French Navy. The lead ship of her class, she was launched in 1781 and captured on 21 April 1782 by a British fleet at the Battle of Ushant. Pégase was subsequently brought back to Portsmouth and commissioned into the Royal Navy as the third-rate HMS Pegase. Pegase was converted into a prison hulk in 1799 and decommissioned and broken up in 1815.

== Career ==
Pégase took part in the Battle of Ushant on 21 April 1782. She was captured by HMS Foudroyant, under Captain John Jervis. Jervis was invested Knight of the Order of the Bath for the capture. Pégase was bought into the Royal Navy and commissioned as the third-rate HMS Pegase. She served as a prison hulk in Portsmouth from 1799, and was broken up in 1815.

== See also ==
- List of ships captured in the 18th century
