= HMS Concorde =

Lead frigate of French Concorde-class

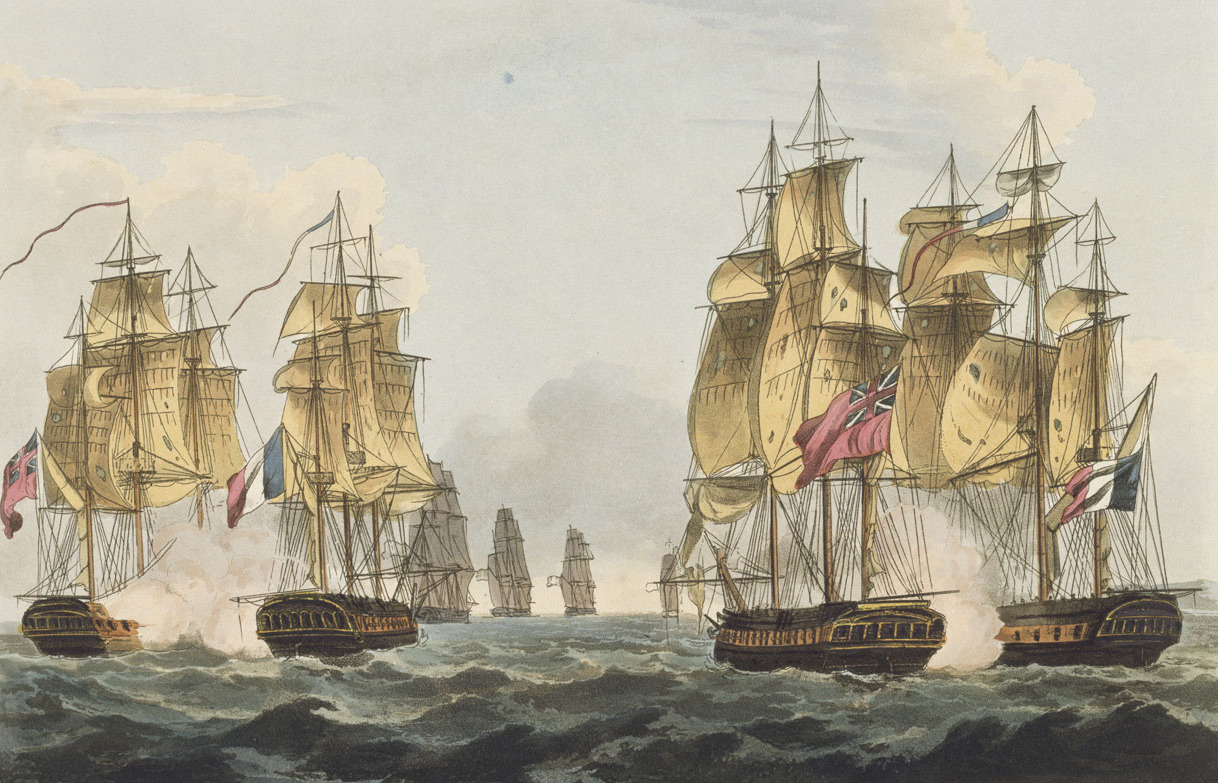
- Concorde (second from right) at the action of 23 April 1794

History

France
- Name: Concorde
- Builder: Rochefort
- Laid down: April 1777
- Launched: 3 September 1777
- Completed: January 1778
- Captured: By the Royal Navy on 15 February 1783

Great Britain
- Name: HMS Concorde
- Acquired: 15 February 1783
- Fate: Sold on 21 February 1811

General characteristics
- Class & type: 32-gun fifth-rate frigate
- Displacement: 1,100 tonneaux
- Tons burthen: 550 port tonneaux; 888 82/94 bm
- Length: 142 ft 11 in (43.6 m) (overall); 118 ft 10 in (36.2 m) (keel)
- Beam: 37 ft 6 in (11.4 m)
- Depth of hold: 11 ft 7 in (3.53 m)
- Sail plan: Full-rigged ship
- Complement: 220
- Armament: (as HMS Concorde); Upper deck: 28 × 12-pdrs; Quarter deck: 4 × 6-pdrs + 6 × 24-pdr carronades; Forecastle: 2 × 6-pdrs + 2 × 24-pdr carronades; (From 1793 all 6-pdrs were all replaced by 24-pdr carronades, later reinstated)

Concorde was a 32-gun frigate of the French Navy, lead ship of her class. Built in Rochefort in 1777, she entered service with the French early in the American War of Independence and was soon in action, capturing HMS Minerva in the West Indies. She survived almost until near the end of the war when HMS Magnificent captured her in 1783. Not immediately brought into service due to the draw-down in the navy after the end of the war, Concorde underwent repairs and returned to active service with the outbreak of war with France in 1793 as the fifth-rate HMS Concorde.

Initially part of squadrons cruising off the French coast, she played an important part in the action of 23 April 1794, capturing the French frigate Engageante. At a later engagement she helped capture the French frigate Virginie. From 1797 until the early 19th century she had especial success against privateers, capturing a large number in the West Indies and in the Atlantic. She had a narrow escape from a superior French force in 1801, but was able to batter her pursuer, the 40-gun French frigate Bravoure, into submission; only the arrival of French reinforcements saved Bravoure from capture. Concorde spent her last years on a variety of stations, including at the Cape of Good Hope and the East Indies. She was laid up in 1807 and sold for breaking up in 1811.

== Construction and French career ==
Concorde was one of three Concorde-class frigates built for the French Navy to a design by Henri Chevillard.^{[a]} She was built at Rochefort between April 1777 and January 1778, being launched on 3 September 1777. She went out to the West Indies after the French entry to the American War of Independence, and reached Martinique on 17 August 1778. On 28 August 1778, under Captain Le Gardeur de Tilly, she came up on the 32-gun HMS Minerva, under Captain John Stott, and after two and a half hours of fighting, captured her.^{[b]} Minerva was towed to Cap Français on Saint-Domingue, where she was joined shortly afterwards by the captured HMS Active, which a hurricane had dismasted in late August and which the French frigates Charmante and Dédaigneuse had captured on 1 September.^{[c]}

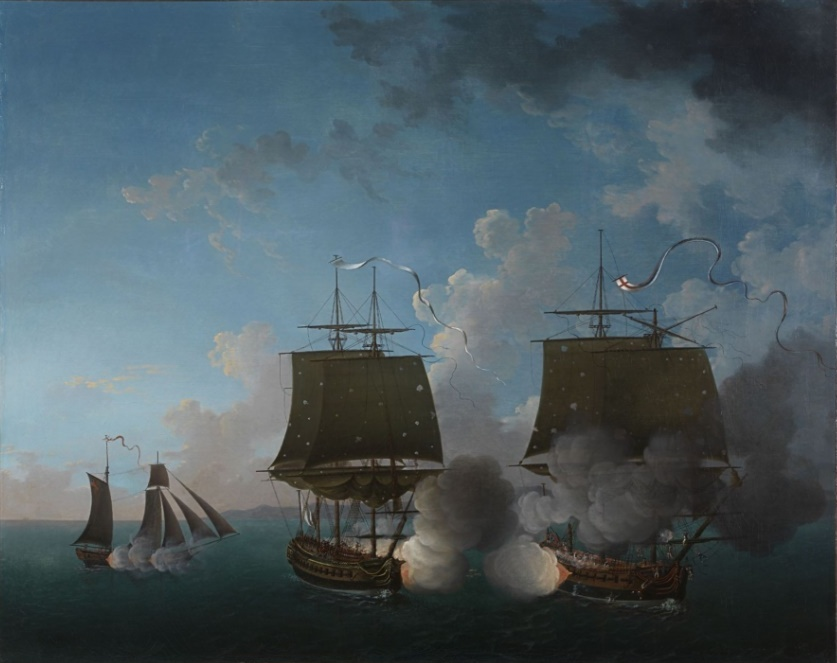
Combat de la Concorde contre la Minerve le 22 août 1778, by Auguste-Louis de Rossel de Cercy.

In France, the action was so highly regarded that the Navy Minister commissioned a painting of the battle.

In 1781 Concorde was responsible for vital transfers of personnel, funds, and communications that contributed to the allied victory at Yorktown. In March 1781 she carried despatches to George Washington and the Comte de Rochambeau from France. These despatches included a request from the comte de Grasse, commander of the West Indies fleet, for information on planned allied operations and the delivery of pilots familiar with the American coast. She also carried 6 million livres to support the war effort, and the new commander of the French naval squadron at Newport, Rhode Island, the comte de Barras. Following a conference of allied leaders in May, Concorde was sent to Cap-Français with despatches for de Grasse and the requested pilots. When de Grasse received these despatches, he made the critical decision to sail his fleet to the Chesapeake Bay to assist in land operations against British forces operating under the command of Charles Cornwallis in Virginia. Concorde carried de Grasse's letters for Washington, Rochambeau, and de Barras back to Newport; arrival of this news set in motion Washington's march to Virginia and the eventual entrapment of Cornwallis at Yorktown.

On 7 January 1783, Concorde was in company with Nymphe. They sighted HMS Raven, which initially sailed towards them until she realized that they were not British frigates. An all-day chase ensued until about 9p.m. when one of the French frigates got within pistol-shot and fired a broadside that took away Raven's main topgallant-mast. The chase continued until about 10:30 p.m. when one of the frigates was again in range, with the other coming up rapidly. At this point, Raven, which was under the command of Commander John Wells, struck. The French Navy took Raven into service under the name Cérès, which she had born when under French colours between 1778 and 1782.

=== Capture ===
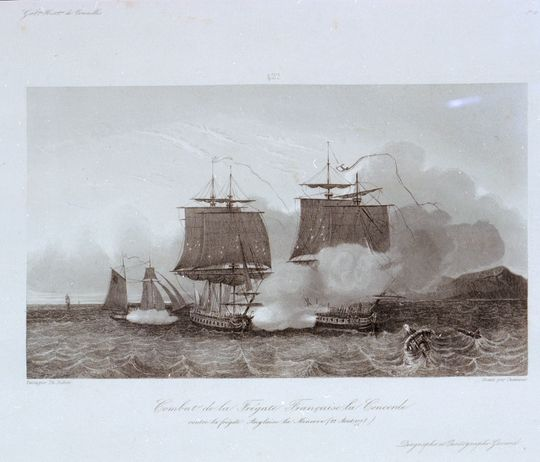
The battle between Concorde and HMS Minerva

On 15 February the 74-gun HMS Magnificent, under Captain Robert Linzee, sighted Concorde. Magnificent had sailed from Gros Islet Bay on 12 February on a cruise in company with the 64-gun ships HMS Prudent and HMS St Albans, and on sighting the strange sail, Magnificent gave chase. She was close enough to identify the mysterious ship as a frigate by 18:00, and by 20:00 as darkness fell Concorde opened fire on her pursuer with her stern guns. Magnificent overhauled the French ship by 21:15, and after fifteen minutes forced her to strike her colours. Magnificent took possession of Concorde, the latter being described as carrying 36 guns and 300 men, and being under the command of M. le Chevalier du Clesmaur. Shortly after surrendering the Concorde's maintopsail caught fire, forcing the crew to cut away the mainmast to extinguish it. Prudent and St Albans came up two hours later and Magnificent towed Concorde to St. John's, Antigua.

== Interwar years ==
Concorde was bought into the navy and commissioned in the West Indies for a return to Britain later in the year, though her commander for this voyage is unknown. She arrived in Britain and was paid off in September at Chatham. With the end of the American War of Independence and the draw-down in the navy, Concorde was not brought into immediate service but remained laid up at Chatham until November 1790, when Wilson, of Frindsbury. began a great repair. The work, which cost a total of £18,259, was completed by April 1793, by which time the French Revolutionary Wars had broken out. Concorde was fitted for service at Chatham between April and May 1793, at a cost of £6,600, and was commissioned in April under Captain Thomas Wells.

== French Revolutionary Wars ==
In 1794 command of Concorde passed to Captain Sir Richard Strachan, and she joined Commodore John Borlase Warren's squadron off the French coast. The squadron also included Warren's 36-gun HMS Flora, the 38-gun HMS Arethusa under Captain Sir Edward Pellew, and the 36-gun frigates HMS Melampus, under Captain Thomas Wells, and HMS Nymphe, under Captain George Murray.

=== Concorde and Engageante ===
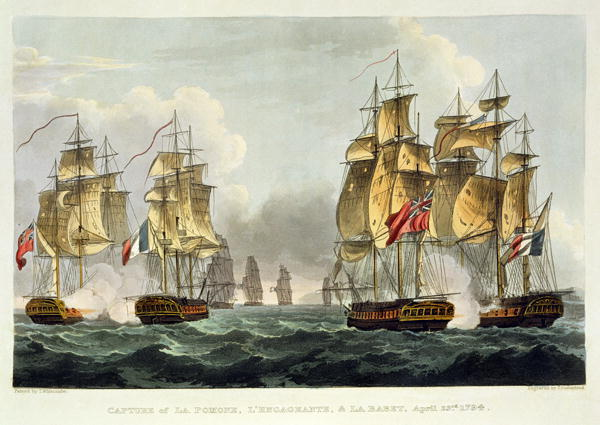
Depiction of the action of 23 April 1794 by Thomas Whitcombe

While sailing off the Channel Islands on 23 April the British squadron came across a French squadron under Commodore Desgareaux consisting of the 36-gun French frigate Engageante, the 44-gun Pomone, the 36-gun Résolue, and the 24-gun Babet. Warren chased and engaged them, leading the attack in Flora. When Flora was badly damaged from the combined fire from the French ships, the remaining British ships came up in support, and forced the rear-most French ships, Babet and Pomone, to surrender. Melampus, Nymphe and Concorde gave chase to the fleeing Résolue and Engageante. Strachan in Concorde attempted to damage the rearmost of the French ships, Engageante, before pushing on to chase Résolue, but Résolue dropped back to support Engageante, damaging Concorde's sails and rigging. With Nymphe and Melampus still too far astern, and unable to catch Résolue himself, Strachan engaged Engageante and after 105 minutes of fighting, forced her to surrender, while Résolue made her escape.^{[d]} Concorde lost one man killed and 12 wounded in the fighting.

=== Concorde and Virginie ===
Concorde was then assigned to Rear-Admiral George Montagu's squadron in May 1794, and took part in the manoeuvres during the Atlantic campaign of May 1794. Strachan left Concorde in July 1794 to take command of Melampus, and in August Captain Anthony Hunt took over command of Concorde. Concorde was part of John Warren's squadron off Quiberon between June and July 1795, supporting the Quiberon Expedition, after which she joined Sir Edward Pellew's squadron. On 20 April 1796 Pellew's squadron, then consisting of Concorde, Pellew's 38-gun HMS Indefatigable, and the 36-gun HMS Amazon under Captain Robert Carthew Reynolds, spotted and chased a mysterious sail. After chasing their quarry for 15 hours over 168 miles they caught up with her, with Indefatigable leading the attack. Both ships exchanged fire, considerably damaging each other, upon which Concorde came up under the quarry's stern and forced her to surrender. She was discovered to be the 40-gun French frigate Virginie, under Captain Jacques Bergeret. Virginie was towed to port and taken into the navy.

=== Later years ===
On 31 January 1795 Concorde was part of a squadron under Captain Sir John Borlase Warren that seized the Dutch East India Ship Ostenhuyson.

Command of Concorde passed from Hunt to Captain Richard Bagot in November 1796, and he in turn was succeeded by Captain Batholomew Roberts in June 1797. Concorde captured the 4-gun privateer Poisson Volant off Cape Finisterre on 24 July 1797. She was bound from Bordeaux to Guadeloupe carrying wines and merchandise, after which she intended to cruise as a privateer in the West Indies. Concorde was later commanded by Captain Robert Barton, who took a number of privateers in a series of cruises in the West Indies in 1798, capturing the 16-gun Caye du Pont off St Bartholomew on 3 January, the 8-gun Proserpine off Montserrat on 8 January, the 8-gun Hardi off Barbuda on 11 February, the 2-gun Hazard off Montserrat on 13 February, and the 2-gun Rosière off Montserrat on 1 April. In an action with HMS Lapwing on 8 and 9 September she captured four privateers, the 8-gun Buonaparte, 10-gun Amazone, 4-gun Sauveur, and 2-gun Fortune.

Concorde's success against privateers continued with the capture of the 18-gun Prudente on 14 February 1799, the 6-gun San Josef off Porto in December 1800, and the 1-gun San Miguel el Volante on 1 December 1800. Next, Concorde had a narrow escape from a French squadron under Rear-Admiral Honoré Joseph Antoine Ganteaume, which had sailed from Brest on 23 January 1801. The French sighted Concorde off Cape Finisterre on 27 January, and sent the 40-gun French frigate Bravoure to chase her down. Concorde cast off a Swedish ship she was towing and drew the French frigate away from the main body of the fleet. Barton then turned and engaged Bravoure for forty minutes, silencing her guns. By now the main French fleet was fast approaching, and with his sails and rigging damaged, Barton did not attempt to take possession of Bravoure. Instead he made for a British port to report the encounter. Concorde had four men killed and 19 wounded in the engagement; Bravoure had 10 killed and 24 wounded.

== Napoleonic Wars ==
Captain John Wood succeeded Barton in 1802, and the following year Concorde went out to the Cape of Good Hope. On 7 November 1804, she captured the 24-gun privateer Fortune, under François-Thomas Le Même, after a ten-hour running battle. In the battle Fortune lost two men killed and had four wounded; Concorde had no casualties. Fortune also suffered extensive damage to her rigging. A few days earlier at Qais Island Fortune had captured and scuttled Fly, a 14-gun brig belonging to the Bombay Marine of the British East India Company. Captain Wood received his prisoners "with distinction" and Concorde returned to Bombay. Fortune, reduced to a poor condition, limped in several days later.

Concorde was under Captain John Cramer, probably from February 1806. She was still in the East Indies in 1807, where in July she captured the 2-gun privateer Vigilant.

== Fate ==
Concorde returned to England and was paid off in September 1807. She spent several years laid up in Ordinary. The Navy sold her at Deptford on 21 February 1811.

== Notes ==
a. Concorde's sisters were the Hermione and Courageuse. Hermione was wrecked in 1793, while Courageuse was captured during the siege of Toulon, but was retaken in the fall of the city to the French. She was retaken by the British while sailing in the Mediterranean in 1799 and taken into the navy.

b. Stott was badly wounded in the engagement, losing a piece of his ear, and his hearing and eyesight to the resulting swelling. A ball remained lodged in his head, and he died shortly aftwerwards on Hispaniola. A young Horatio Nelson was serving in the West Indies at the time, and wrote to his friend and patron William Locker about the captures, noting that William Williams, commander of Active had also died shortly afterwards, apparently of a broken heart. The heavy British losses at the time speeded Nelson's own promotion, and he was made master and commander of the brig HMS Badger on 8 December 1778.

c. Minerva was retaken on 4 January 1781 and was renamed HMS Recovery. Active spent the rest of her career with the French Navy, until being condemned and broken up in November 1794.

d. This was not Strachan's first encounter with Résolue. While serving in the East Indies in command of the 36-gun HMS Phoenix in November 1791 Strachan received orders to stop and search a French convoy, escorted by Résolue, which was believed to be carrying supplies for the support of Tipu Sultan, whom the British were then fighting in the Third Anglo-Mysore War. Résolue resisted and a brief action took place before the French surrendered. As Britain and France were not at war, Résolue was then restored to the French.
