= HMS Nymphe (1780) =

Frigate of the Royal Navy

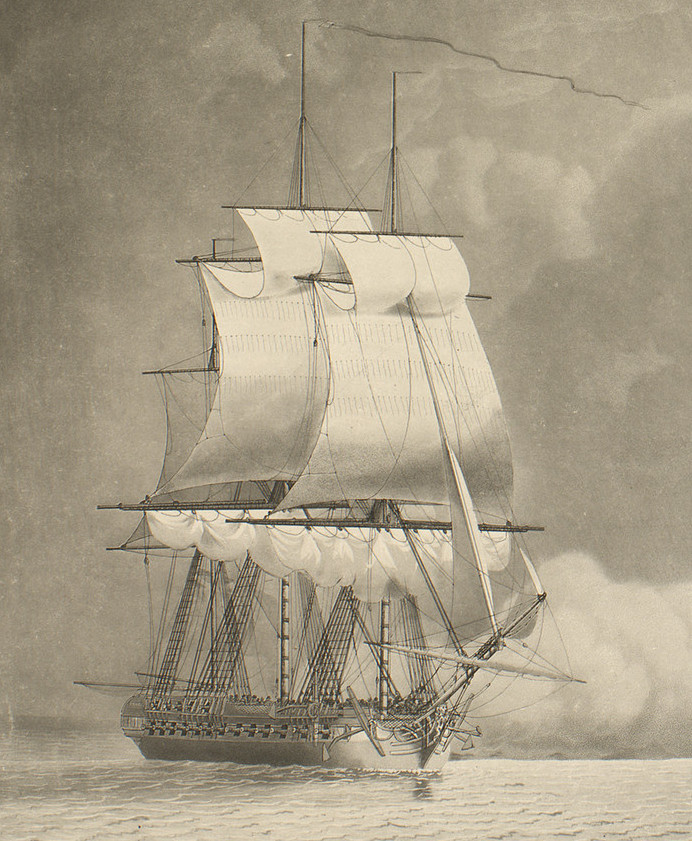
- HMS Nymphe off Start Point, Devon in 1793

History

Kingdom of France
- Name: Nymphe
- Namesake: Nymph
- Builder: Pierre-Augustin Lamothe, Brest
- Laid down: April 1777
- Launched: 18 August 1777
- Commissioned: November 1777
- Fate: Captured by HMS Flora, 10 August 1780

Great Britain
- Name: HMS Nymphe
- Acquired: by capture, 10 August 1780
- Honours and awards: Naval General Service Medal clasps: "Nymphe" 18 June 1793"; "23 June 1795"; "Nymphe 8 March 1797"
- Fate: Wrecked in the Firth of Forth, 18 December 1810

General characteristics
- Class & type: Nymphe class
- Type: Fifth-rate frigate
- Displacement: 1100 tonneaux
- Tons burthen: 600 port tonneaux; 937 72/94 (bm)
- Length: 141 ft 5 1/2 in (43.12 m) (gun deck); 120 ft 4 1/2 in (36.69 m) (keel)
- Beam: 38 ft 3 1/4 in (11.66 m)
- Depth of hold: 11 ft 9 in (3.58 m)
- Sail plan: Full-rigged ship
- Complement: 240
- Armament: 1777; UD: 26 × French 12-pounder guns; QD: 4 × French 6-pounder guns; FC: 2 × French 6-pounder guns; 1780; UD: 26 × 12-pounder guns; QD: 8 × 6-pounder guns; FC: 2 × 6-pounder guns; 1790; UD: 26 × 12-pounder guns; QD: 12 × 32-pounder carronades; FC: 2 × 9-pounder guns + 2 × 32-pounder carronades

Service record
- Operations: Battle of the Chesapeake (5 September 1781); Battle of the Saintes (9–12 April 1782); Action of 18 June 1793; Action of 23 April 1794; Battle of Groix (23 June 1795); Quiberon expedition (June–July 1795)

HMS Nymphe was a fifth-rate frigate of the British Royal Navy, formerly the French Nymphe, lead ship of her class. HMS Flora, under the command of Captain William Peere Williams, captured Nymphe off Ushant on 10 August 1780. Indiscriminately referred to as Nymph, Nymphe, La Nymph or La Nymphe in contemporary British sources, she served during the American, French Revolutionary and Napoleonic Wars. On 19 May 1793, while under the command of Captain Edward Pellew, she captured the frigate Cléopâtre, the first French warship captured in a single-ship action of the war. After a long period of service in which she took part in several notable actions and made many captures, Nymphe was wrecked off the coast of Scotland on 18 December 1810.

== Construction ==
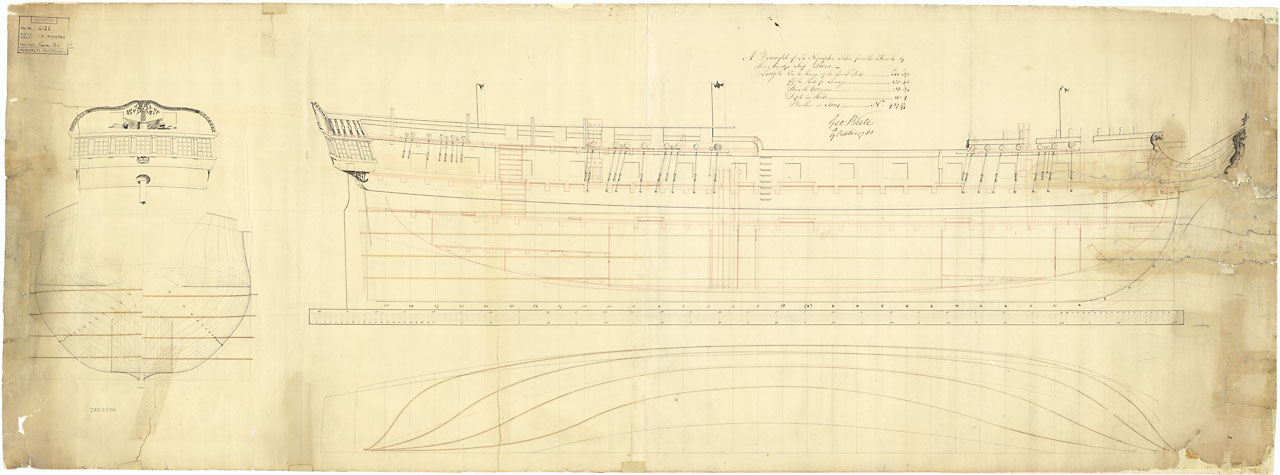
Nymphe

Nymphe was built as a 32-gun frigate at Brest, designed and constructed by Pierre-Augustin Lamothe. She was laid down in April 1777, launched on 18 August, and commissioned in November. She carried a complement of 290 men, and was armed with twenty-six French 12-pounder guns (Note: As the French pound (livre) was equal to 1.097 English pounds, the French "12-pounder" fired a slightly heavier (13.164 lb) ball than its British equivalent.) and six French 6-pounders.

== French service ==
Nymphe entered service in November 1777. In 1778, she was under Sainneville for a mission off Newfoundland.

In February and March 1779, Nymphe was off Senegal with Résolue to raid British factories, notably capturing Fort James of Kunta Kinteh Island on 11 February, and Îles de Los on 6 March.

In July 1780, Nymphe was returning to Brest from America, under Du Rumain, when she encountered the 64-gun HMS Bienfaisant, which she managed to escape.

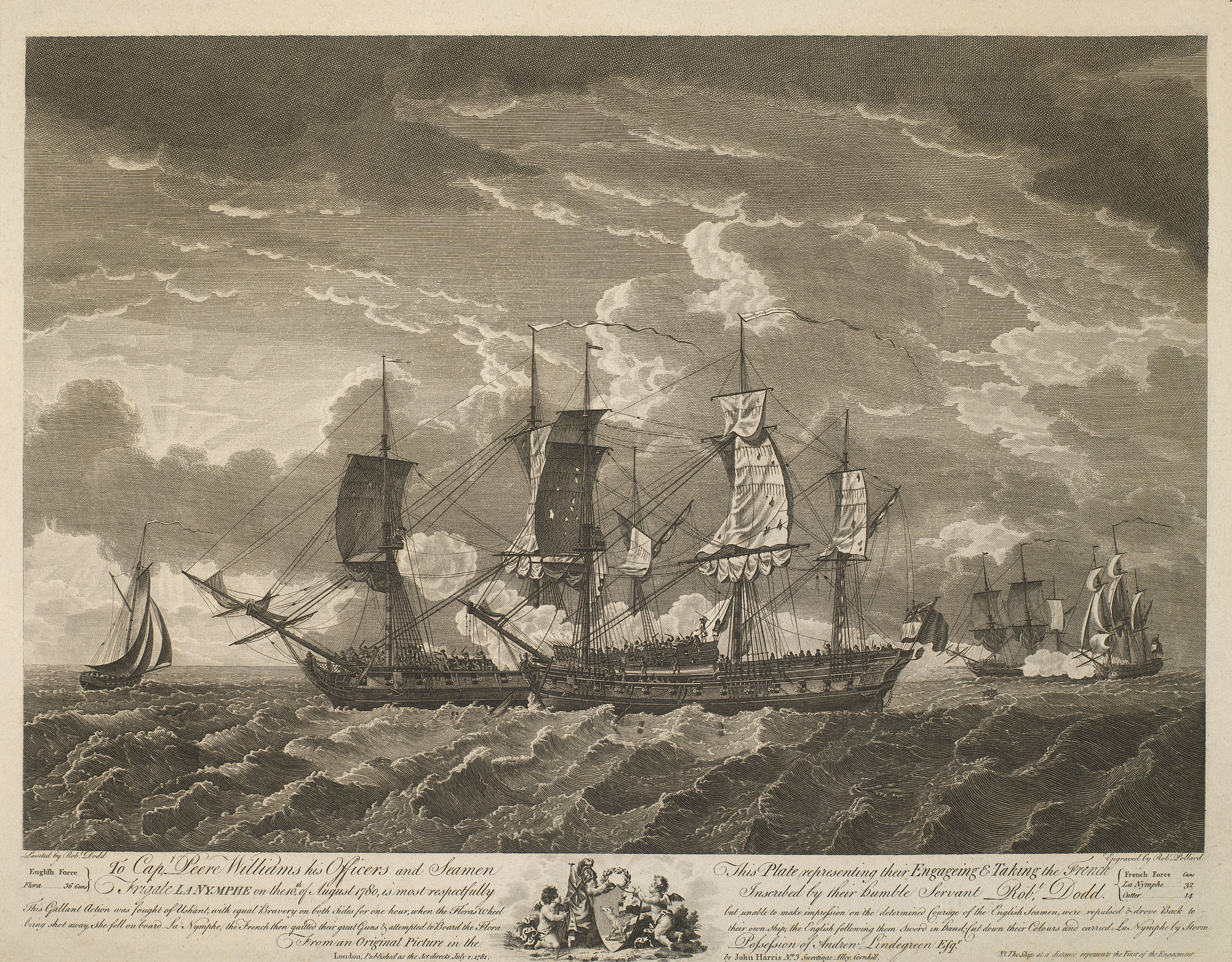
Naval battle at Ushant, 10 August 1780. Nymphe engaged by HMS Flora

On 10 August, 12 miles off Ushant, Nymphe met the 36-gun frigate HMS Flora (1780). The Action of 10 August 1780 started at 1715. Half an hour later, Du Rumain was mortally wounded by three bullets, and Lieutenant Pennandref de Keranstret took over. Around 1800, Flora closed in and the crew of Nymphe attempted to board her, but the British repelled them, killing Pennandref and wounding most of the officers. The British then counter-attacked, quickly conquering the deck of Nymphe. Lieutenant de frégate Taillard then surrendered to the British.

Nymphe was pierced for 40 guns, but mounted only 32. Flora, as well as her nominal armament of 36 guns, also carried six recently-introduced 18-pounder carronades, which swept the decks of the French ship with grapeshot. In addition Flora's guns were heavier, 18- and 9-pounders, against the French ship's 12- and 6-pounders. This is reflected in the number of casualties; 9 killed and 17 wounded on Flora out of a crew of 259, and 55 killed and 81 wounded aboard Nymphe, from a crew of 291.

== British Service ==
=== 1780–1793 ===
Nymphe was sent to Portsmouth Dockyard to be repaired and refitted. The work was completed on 27 March 1781 at a cost of £9,657.10s.7d., and she was commissioned under the command of Captain John Ford. Nymphe then served in the American War seeing action at the Battle of the Chesapeake on 5 September 1781, serving as a repeating ship (relaying signals to other ships) in the centre division of Rear Admiral Thomas Graves. She also, in company with Amphion, captured the American privateers Royal Louis, Juno, Molly, Lexington, Racoon, and Lively Buckskin. In 1782 she sailed to the Leeward Islands, and was present at the Battle of the Saintes on 12 April. In May 1783 she arrived back at Portsmouth, and was paid off in June, while under the command of Captain C. Knatchbull.

In March 1786 Nymphe began "middling repairs" at Portsmouth Dockyard, which were completed in January 1787 at a cost of £9,704. She was briefly recommissioned from October to December 1787 under the command of Captain Albemarle Bertie. Further repair work was carried out at Portsmouth in May and June 1790 at a cost of £2,004.

=== 1793 ===
In response to the looming threat of war, Nymphe was recommissioned under the command of Captain Edward Pellew on 11 January 1793. However, by the time Pellew arrived at Portsmouth on the 15th, the press gangs had swept the town clean of seamen. Pellew prepared his ship for sea, and did his best to recruit a crew. When, as expected, the government of revolutionary France declared war on Great Britain on 1 February 1793 Nymphe was still in dock, and not ready for sea until the 6th. Nymphe finally sailed on the 12th, with barely more than half her complement, which included 32 marines, and 80 Cornish tin-miners, all mere landsmen. Pellew was obliged to bring his crew up to strength by boarding several of the merchant vessels he was escorting in the Channel and impressing experienced sailors.

On 19 May 1793, Nymphe sailed from Spithead in company with the frigate Venus, commanded by Captain Jonathan Faulknor. After chasing some French vessels into Cherbourg, the two frigates lost touch with each other on the 24th. Later that day Nymphe captured the French 16-gun privateer brig Sans Culottes. Venus fared less well, encountering the Sémillante on the 26th off Finistère, and failing to take her. After a fight lasting some hours both ships were considerably damaged, and Sémillante returned to Cherbourg, and the Venus limped back to Portsmouth, meeting Nymphe on the 29th.

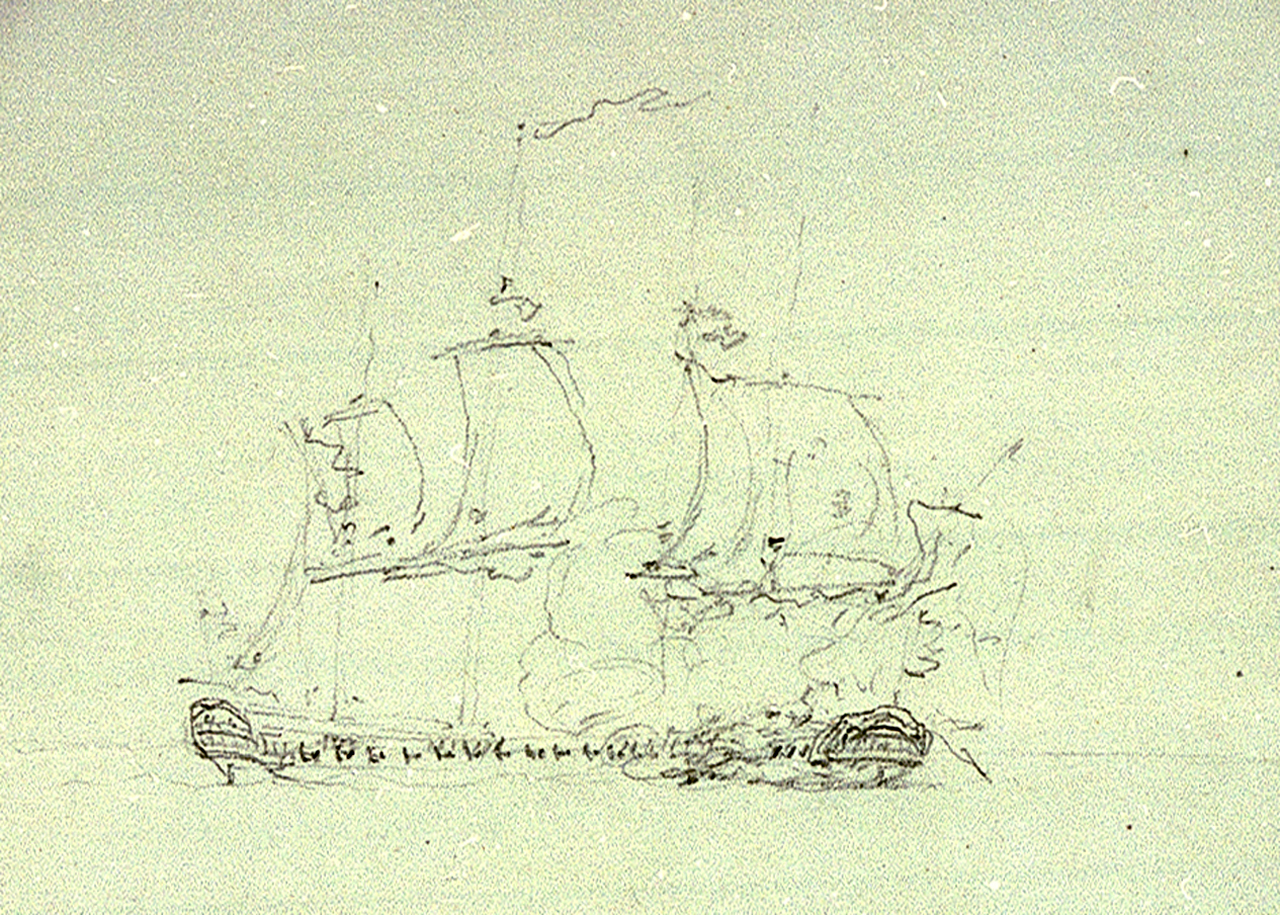
A sketch of the engagement between Nymphe and Cleopatre by Nicholas Pocock, 1793

At daybreak on 18 June 1793, Nymphe was sailing alone off Start Point, Devon, when she sighted the 40-gun Cléopâtre, commanded by Lieutenant de vaisseau Jean Mullon. In the resulting action Cléopâtre was captured at a cost of about 60 killed, including her captain, while Nymphe suffered 23 killed and 27 wounded. The arrival of the ship in Britain was greeted with much rejoicing as the first major French warship captured during the war, and earned Pellew a knighthood. His brother Israel, who was serving aboard as a volunteer, was promoted to captain, the first lieutenant Amherst Morris promoted to commander, and the master, Mr. Thomson, to lieutenant. In 1847 it was among the actions recognised by a clasp, marked "Nymphe 18 June 1793", attached to the Naval General Service Medal awarded upon application to all British participants from Nymphe still living.

Nymphe returned to sea on 26 July, after repairs at Plymouth which cost £6,308. She patrolled the Channel and Bay of Biscay, looking for further prizes. Finally, on 30 November, just outside Brest, she and Circe captured the French sloop, L'Espiegle.

=== 1794–1795 ===
In March 1794 Pellew was appointed to command of the more powerful 38-gun frigate Arethusa, and command of Nymphe was assumed by Captain George Murray. Nymphe was then part of the squadron of five frigates under Sir John Borlase Warren that engaged four French frigates off the Channel Isles on 23 April 1794, and captured three; the Pomone, Engageante and Babet.

Nymphe was then part of the Channel Fleet, under Lord Bridport, which sailed from Spithead on 12 June 1795 to Quiberon Bay. Early on 22 June, a French fleet was sighted west of Belle Île, and the British give chase. After a long pursuit, around 06:00 on the morning of the 23rd the fleets met in the Battle of Groix, in which three French ships were captured before action was broken off. The British fleet then remained off the French coast protecting the Quiberon Bay expedition. Nymphe returned to England in December 1795 under the command of Captain George Losack to be paid off.

=== 1796–1799 ===
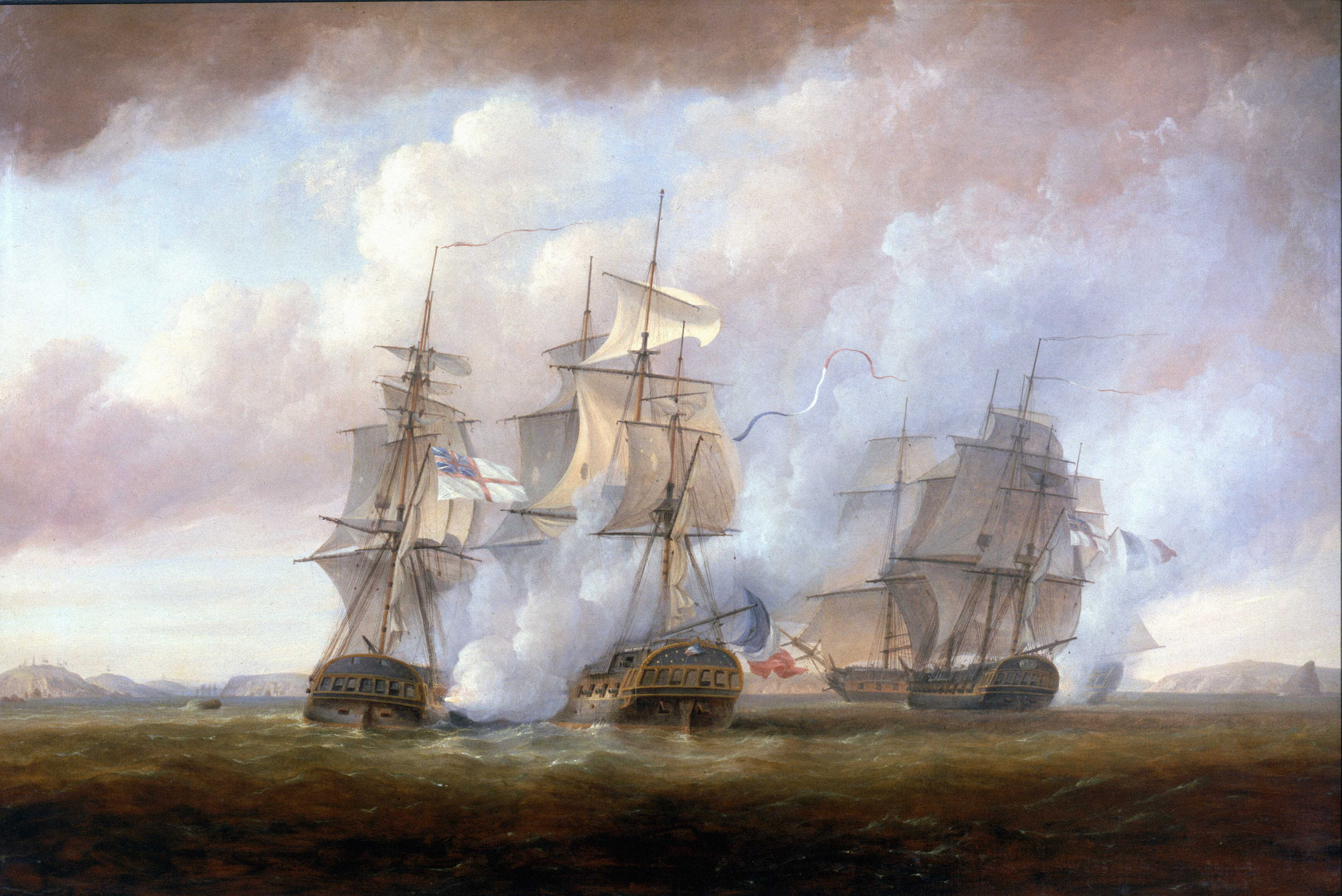
The capture of Résistance and Constance by HMS San Fiorenzo and Nymphe, 9 March 1797.

After repairs at Plymouth, during which she was coppered, the ship was recommissioned in May 1796 under the command of Captain John Cooke. On 9 March 1797 Nymphe and St Fiorenzo, while making a reconnaissance of Brest, sighted two French ships standing in towards the harbour. After a sharp action lasting no more than 30 minutes they captured both ships, which proved to be the 48-gun frigate Résistance and the 24-gun corvette Constance built in 1794, both returning from the failed expedition to Wales. There were no casualties or damage on either of the British ships. Resistance had ten men killed and nine wounded; Constance had eight men killed and six wounded. Resistance had 48 guns, with 18-pounders on her main deck, and a crew of 345 men. Constance had twenty-four 9-pounder guns, and a crew of 181 men. The Royal Navy took both into service. Résistance became Fisgard, while Constance retained her name. In 1847 the Admiralty awarded the Naval General Service Medal with clasp "Nymphe 8 March 1797" to surviving claimants from the action. (Note: The reason for the discrepancy between the date of the action and the date on the clasp was that the Admiralty considered that a day ran from noon to noon. Thus the morning of 9 March was, to the Admiralty, the end of 8 March.)

Nymphe was one of the ships involved in the Spithead Mutiny of April and May 1797, when the men of the Channel Fleet struck for improved pay and conditions. According to statements by the crew, no particular accusation was brought against Captain Cooke, but his conduct was considered unsatisfactory. The chief complaints were made against the lieutenants, particularly Irwin, the first lieutenant. On one occasion, after receiving a flogging, a seaman was seen to smile. Irwin promptly ordered that he receive an additional 36 lashes for "silent contempt". The lieutenants of the Nymphe made a practice of beating the men themselves if they considered that the boatswain's mates were not putting enough effort into it. They would order floggings for the most trivial offences. On one occasion two men were beaten for "slackness", in not carrying out an order fast enough, both received twelve lashes. For a similar offence another seaman was beaten and kicked so severely that he was advised to go on the sick list. The seaman refused, through fear of the officers. As a result Cooke and his two lieutenants were sent ashore by the mutineers.

Captain Percy Fraser was appointed commander of Nymphe in June 1797. On 21 February, 1798 she, Phaeton, and Mermaid recaptured American armed mechantman "Eliza" (49°10′N 10°30′W) that had been captured by French privateer "Don Guicote" on 13 February. He claimed that on 6 September 1798 Nymphe had been in company with Aurora and the privateer Lord Hawke, and had captured the Spanish ship L'Edad de Oro, which had sailed from La Guaira, Venezuela, with a cargo of cocoa, bound for Corunna, but was captured only a few miles from her destination. (Note: Nicholas Tomlinson, formerly commander of the brig HMS Suffisante, was Lord Hawke's owner at the time, and possibly onboard. He was criticised for being both a naval officer (though not at the time assigned to a vessel) and the owner of a privateer. The prize court upheld the claims by Nymphe and Aurora. Tomlinson published a letter that was reprinted in the Naval Chronicle defending his ownership and including an extract from Nymphe's log that makes clear that she was not present at the capture, did not know when it had taken place, had not heard Lord Hawke's shots and broadside, and made no mention of Aurora being in sight. The letter further makes clear that Captain Percy Fraser of Nymphe had used extortionate threats to force Captain Neale, of Lord Hawke to sign a document accepting Fraser's account of capture. Fraser's behavior is, of course, completely understandable as there was apparently a great deal of money at stake. Tomlinson was later taken off the list of post captains, ostensibly for inattention for not answering signals from Nymphe when Nymphe was in sight. A later report states that Tomlinson had been struck for using a private signal while on Lord Hawke, but that he had been restored to the list in recognition of his "very eminent services".)

On 7 September Nymphe recaptured the sloop Charlotte of London, originally bound for Newfoundland.

In April 1799 Nymphe was again assigned to a squadron under Lord Bridport's command, which was tasked with blockading the French port of Brest. Rumours had circulated that a French fleet would attempt to run the blockade. To forestall this escape, Lord Bridport instructed Captain Fraser to keep Nymphe close to shore to monitor French movements and report back if any ships set sail. On the morning of 26 April Nymphe was in the roadstead of Brest in heavy fog when Fraser observed what he took to be a French fleet of eleven ships of the line, sailing west. Nymphe immediately tacked to get ahead of the enemy, and signal flags were raised to alert Bridport's fleet that the French were on the move. These signals were not seen in the fog, and Fraser inexplicably lowered them shortly afterward. By midday Nymphe had lost sight of the French and Fraser instead raised new signals incorrectly advising that the enemy had returned to port. This second set of signals were relayed to Bridport's squadron without them having received the first, causing considerable confusion. On the morning of 27 April Nymphe returned to her station close to Brest and inaccurately reported that the French fleet was at anchor. In fact the entire French fleet had set sail the previous morning and escaped through the fog to the Mediterranean.

Fraser later acknowledged Nymphe's failure to maintain contact with the French, and the confusion caused by his signals, noting in a letter to Admiralty that "I suppose ... you are at a loss to understand what all the signals that have been made today meant," and "it is possible that the officer who will answer it may not feel quite competent to the explanation." Following these failures at Brest, Nymphe was withdrawn from the blockade and sailed for Ireland.

On 7 November 1799, Nymphe, Indefatigable, and Diamond recaptured the ship Brailsford from the French, and 10 November Nymphe recaptured the merchant ship Astrea.

=== 1800 ===
Operating in company with Amethyst, Nymphe made a series of valuable captures and recaptures in early 1800. The French privateer cutter Le Vaillant was taken on 15 February. On 24 February, off Bordeaux, they captured the 16-gun French merchant ship La Modeste, nine weeks out of Mauritius, and laden with cotton, coffee, tea, sugar and indigo. The Julius Pringle was recaptured 27 February, followed by the Active on 4 March, and the Amity the 21st. The 22-gun French privateer Mars was taken on the 31st, and the ship Caroline was recaptured on 14 April.

=== 1801 ===
Nymphe operated in the English Channel during 1801, under the command of Captain Stair Douglas. On 23 January 1801 Nymphe counted twenty-eight sail of the line and nine frigates at anchor in the outer roads at Brest. Two days later not a ship was to be seen. Douglas reported that although a squadron may have escaped the rest had probably gone into the inner roads to deceive the watching ships. He returned to Plymouth on 20 February and sailed again on 29 April for a long cruise off Corunna. On 14 July, she recaptured the ship Lady Arabella, returning to her home port on 31 August. Her next cruise was off Brest and, although news of the preliminary agreement of the Treaty of Amiens reached Plymouth on 4 October, she did not return until 15 November. On 29 December she was in Portsmouth.

=== 1802–1806 ===
During the temporary peace Nymphe operated on anti-smuggling patrols. At the end of January 1802 she intercepted a cutter, the Flora of Fowey, Captain Dunn, being chased by the frigate Fisgard. The cutter struck after her mizzen shrouds got entangled with Nymphe's bowsprit. During the action a midshipman had his hand so badly injured that it had to be amputated, and a seaman was washed overboard. On 13 February Nymphe sailed from Plymouth on a six-day cruise against smugglers, and was finally paid off at Portsmouth on 30 April 1802.

Nymphe was commissioned in 1803 under the command of Captain Somerville. During the night of 29 December a fierce gale wrecked a number of ships in Plymouth Sound. The men from a wrecked Prussian galliot were rescued by Nymphe.

Nymphe remained out of commission, maintained "in Ordinary" at Portsmouth until June 1806 when large repairs where undertaken at Deptford Dockyard.

=== 1807-1808 ===
Nymphe was recommissioned in March 1807 under the command of Captain Conway Shipley. On 25 July 1807 she joined the fleet assembling at Yarmouth for the expedition to Copenhagen. She sailed with the first division under Admiral Lord Gambier in the Prince of Wales the next evening. She was employed in the Great Belt, preventing Danish troops crossing to Zealand, before taking part in the siege and bombardment of Copenhagen and capture of the Danish Fleet. On 4 November 1807 she sailed for Portugal.

In April 1808 Nymphe was cruising off Lisbon, in company with the 18-gun sloop Blossom, Commander George Pigot, when Captain Shipley learned that the 20-gun brig Gaivota was lying by Belém Castle, making ready to sail. At 21:00 on the evening of 23 April a force of eight boats with 150 officers and men from Nymphe and Blossom set out to capture her. Unfortunately, a strong ebb tide fed by heavy rains set in, slowing their approach and it was not until 02:30 that the boats of Nymphe reached the brig. Captain Shipley led the boarders, climbing the fore-rigging and attempting to cut away the boarding-netting, but he was shot and fell into the river. His brother, Charles Shipley, serving as a volunteer, immediately ordered the gig to pick him up, but the boats fell afoul of each other and became entangled with a caulking stage moored astern. Having lost the element of surprise, and with the boats of Blossom failing to reach the brig, the enterprise was abandoned. As well as her captain, Nymphe lost a seaman, and one marine was wounded. Captain Shipley's body was later recovered and it was evident that he had been killed instantly by a musket ball through the forehead. Commander Pigot was appointed by Admiral Sir Charles Cotton, the commander-in-chief on the coast of Portugal, to be Captain Shipley's successor on board Nymphe; and on 17 September he was confirmed in his post-rank. Captain The Hon. Josceline Percy, was later appointed to command her, while operating off the coast of Spain.

=== 1810 & loss ===
On 14 May 1810 Captain Edward Sneyd Clay assumed command. On 26 October 1810 he captured the 2-gun Danish privateer Norwegian Girl. On the evening of 18 December 1810 Nymphe and Pallas, were wrecked off Dunbar at the mouth of the Firth of Forth. All the crew except nine were saved. Captain Clay and his officers were cleared of blame at the subsequent court martial with the exception of Mr G. Scott, the master, and C. Gascoigne, the pilot, who were judged to have mistaken fires from a lime kiln on shore for the light on the Isle of May.
