= Action of 23 April 1794 =

Part of the War of the First Coalition

- Part of the War of the First Coalition
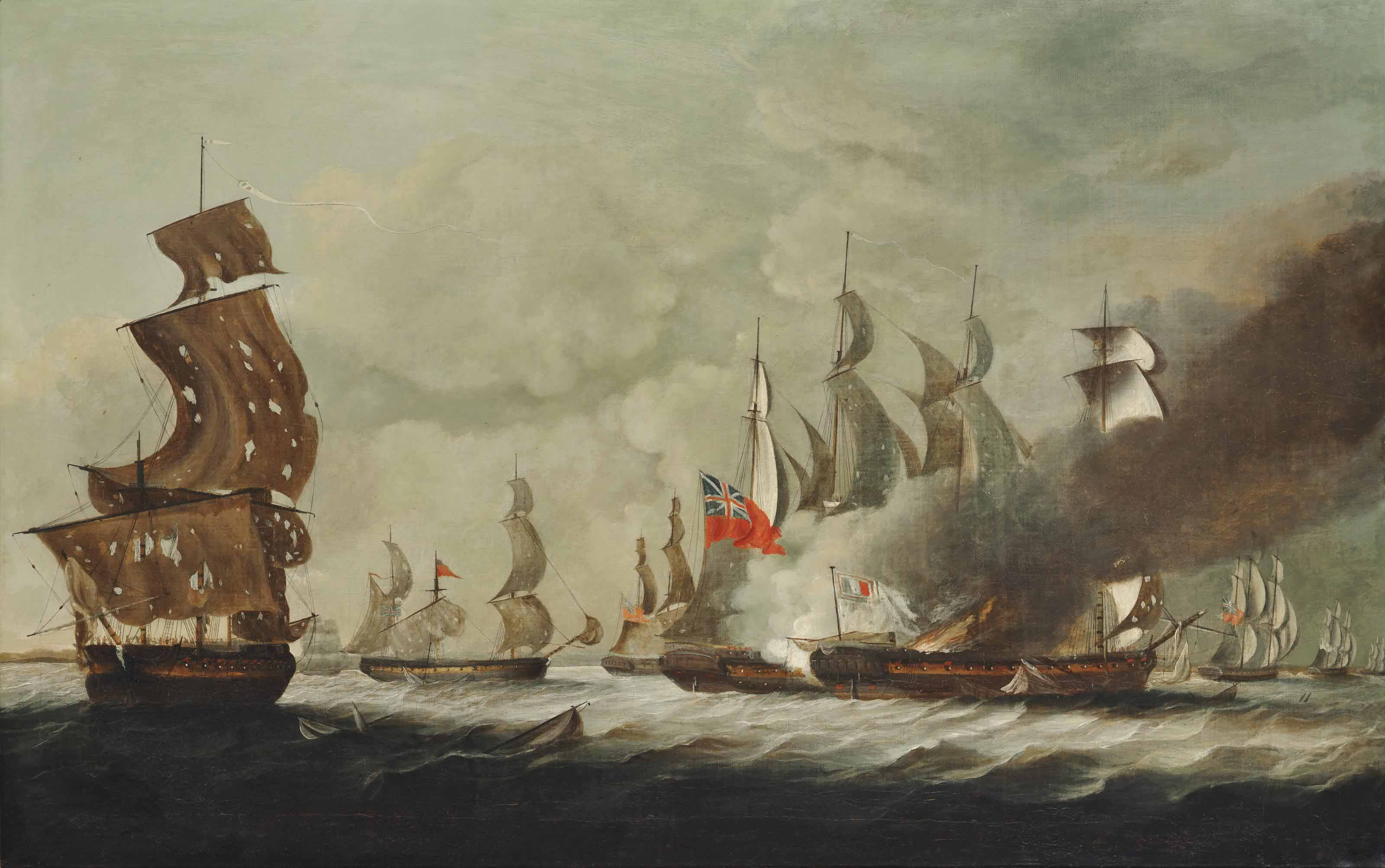
- H.M. frigate Arethusa inflicting the final blows on the French frigate Pomone, 23 April 1794, off the Channel Islands; John Askew, 1805
Date	23 April 1794
Location	Off Guernsey, English Channel
Result	British victory

Belligerents
Great Britain	France

Commanders and leaders
Sir John Borlase Warren; Richard Strachan	Georges Desgarceaux †

Strength
5 frigates	3 frigates 1 corvette

Casualties and losses
10 killed 25 wounded	140 killed or wounded 2 frigates captured 1 corvette captured

The action of 23 April 1794 took place between a British squadron of five frigates under the command of Sir John Borlase Warren and three frigates and a corvette under the command of Chef d'escadre Georges Desgarceaux during the War of the First Coalition. Three of the French ships were captured.

== Battle ==
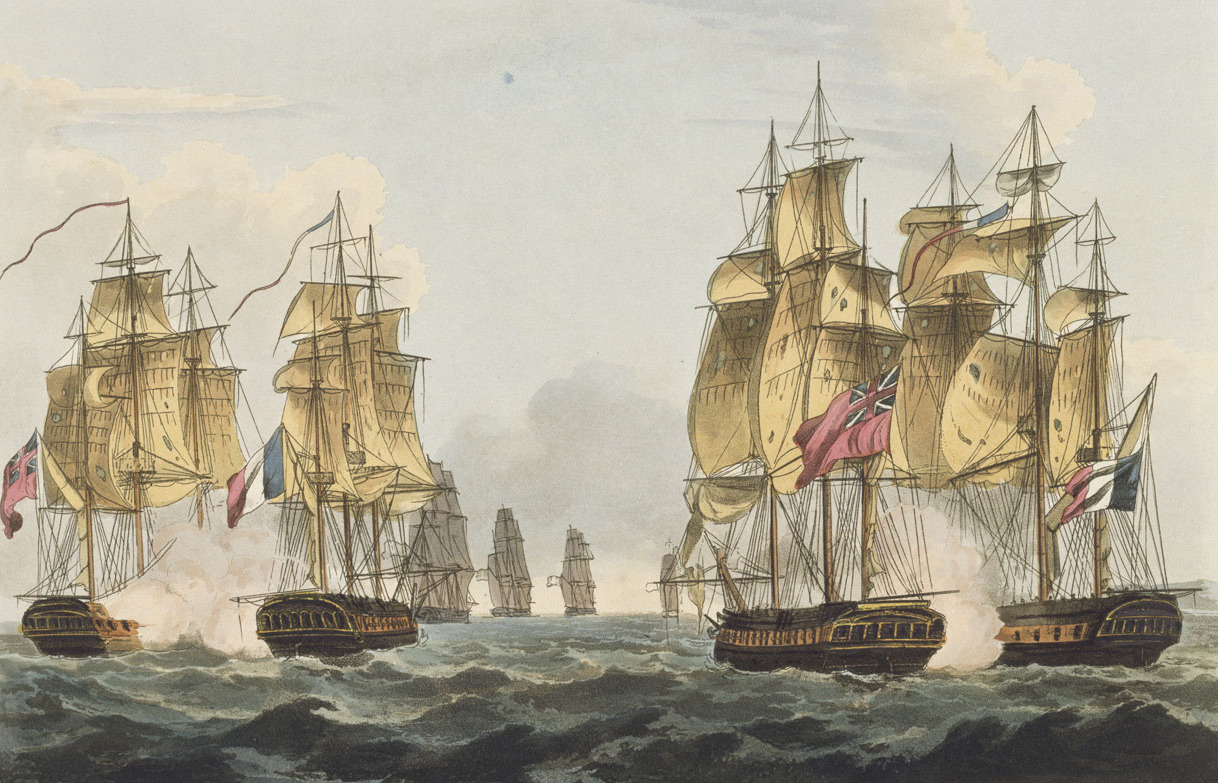
Capture of La Pomone L' Engageante & La Babet April 23rd 1794 (Thomas Whitcombe, 1816)

On 21 April the frigate Minerva sighted four distant ships in the English Channel. The next morning Minerva met Warren's squadron, and passed this information on. Warren promptly set off in pursuit, and at dawn the next day, around 4 a.m., sighted three frigates and a corvette about seven or eight leagues (24.5–28 nautical miles) south-west of Guernsey. The French formed a line of battle, and Warren signalled his squadron to engage, with his own flagship Flora in the lead, supported by Arethusa. Taking advantage of the weather gage the British were able to force the French into a close action which lasted for nearly three hours, before the Pomone and Babet surrendered at around 11 a.m.

The Engageante and Résolue attempted to escape, and Warren ordered Concorde, Melampus and Nymphe to pursue, as Flora was in no condition to do so. After an hour Concorde caught up with Engageante and attempted to disable her, intending to then attack the Résolue, leaving Engageante to Melampus and Nymphe, which were following.

However, while Concorde was engaged with Engageante, the Résolue dropped back and laid herself across Concorde's bows, badly damaging her sails and rigging to the point where she was disabled. Having made hasty repairs Concorde came up again to re-engage the Engageante, which eventually surrendered at about 1.45 p.m. Résolue fired a few shots and then made off, pursued by Melampus and Nymphe, who chased her into Morlaix, before returning to assist Concorde which was towing the crippled Engageante to port.

== Ships ==
=== Britain ===
- Flora, (36) Sir John Borlase Warren, flagship
- Arethusa, (38) Sir Edward Pellew
- Melampus, (36) Thomas Wells
- Concorde, (32) Sir Richard Strachan
- Nymphe, (36) George Murray

=== France ===
- Engageante, (36) Georges Desgarceaux, flagship – captured by Concorde
- Pomone, (36) Étienne Pévrieu – captured by Arethusa
- Résolue, (34) Antoine Marie François Montalan – escaped
- Babet, (20) Pierre-Joseph-Paul Belhomme – captured by Arethusa

== See also ==
Media related to Action of 23 April 1794 at Wikimedia Commons
