= François-Thomas Le Même =

French privateer

François-Thomas Le Même (13 January 1764 – 30 March 1805) was a French privateer.

== Career ==
Le Même was born in Saint-Malo in the family of an accountant, and studied in order to enlist in the navy. At the age of 14, he enlisted as a volunteer on the merchantman Pouponne, which departed Saint-Malo in early 1778, bound for Northern America. After the outbreak of the War of American Independence, Le Même returned to Brest on the Gentille.

Le Même enlisted on the privateer Prince-de-Montbarrey which, after taking a number of prizes, was herself captured by a frigate on 28 June 1779. Exchanged the following year, Le Même served on the ships Lys, Pilote-des-Indes and Petite-Guêpe, which he learnt that the war had ended. Replacing the lieutenant of the ship Marie-Constance, Le Même sailed to Le Havre.

Le Même then sailed on various merchantmen, rising to the rank of captain on 5 January 1790. He served as a lieutenant on the Mississippi, before taking command of the Liberté, bound for the Indies. He departed on 3 September 1791 and arrived at Mauritius before sailing to Pondicheri and Bengal, before returning to Port-Louis. Le Même then took command of the 130-ton brig Hirondelle, and cruised to Java and Sumatra, returning to Mauritius in March 1793.

At the outbreak of the French Revolutionary Wars, Le Même converted Hirondelle into a privateer, arming her with twelve 4-pounder guns and recruiting a 110-man crew. He then departed to prey on Dutch commerce. On 16 August 1793, Hirondelle met the brig 18-gun Good-Werwgting, under Lieutenant Raken, and captured her by boarding. Le Même sent a prize crew under Lieutenant Legars on Good-Werwgting and continued his cruise. On 25 August, Hirondelle met the 40-gun East Indiaman Williams-Thesied, under Captain John Thomson; boarded at once by both Hirondelle and Good-Werwgting, Williams-Thesied surrendered after a 40-minute battle. Hirondelle then returned to Port-Louis with her prizes.

Le Même transferred on the 32-gun privateer Ville-de-Bordeaux, with a 200-man complement, keeping Legars as his lieutenant. He reached Padang in mid-December 1793, stormed the fortress, and captured the Dutch trading post, which he ransomed. He then sailed to Sunda Strait to patrol the area, but an epidemic aboard forced him to abbreviate his cruise and return to Mauritius. While in transit, on 12 February 1794, Ville-de-Bordeaux met the Portuguese Saint-Sacrement (Note: Name in Cunat, p.406, but evidently translated to French.) sailing from Bengal to Lisbon, and captured her. A few days later, a storm separated Ville-de-Bordeaux from her prize; Saint-Sacrement reached Mauritius on 25 February and Ville-de-Bordeaux, on the day after. Le Même was awarded 1 100 000 livres tournois in prize money.

Le Même next captained the privateer Amphititrite, (Note: Cunat (p.407) refers to Amphitrite as a "frigate"; however, no frigate Amphitrite of the French Navy operated in the Indian Ocean circa 1794 (Roche, p.40). Cunant probably means that Amphitrite was a three-masted privateer of the approximate strength of a naval corvette, instead of the more usual brigs used by privateers.) a prize taken by Sercey's squadron in the Indian Ocean and sold by the colonial government of Mauritius; Amphititrite was old and in poor condition, and after cruising off Cape of Good Hope without taking any prize, she sprang leaks and foundered in Bombetoka Bay, forcing her crew to return to Mauritius on small ships.

Le Même then sailed on the privateer Uni before transferring on Clarisse, and retired. He started a career and a businessman, in which he lost his 1,400,000 livre tournois fortune.

In 1803, with the outbreak of the War of the Third Coalition, Le Même took command of the 360-ton three-masted privateer Fortune; on 26 January 1804, Fortune fought an indecisive battle against the British frigate Bombay. (Note: Possibly HCS Bombay) After a six-month cruise, he returned to Mauritius with eight prizes. On 20 August 1804, Fortune departed Mauritius to take station in the Persian Gulf area, where she captured the 16-gun East Indiaman brig Fly after a 30-minute battle. Fly carried 50,000 piastres for the British government. Fortune continued her patrol and captured a number of smaller prizes.

Le Même then decided to cruise off Gujarat; on 7 November, around 10:00, Fortune met the frigate HMS Concorde, under Captain John Wood. Concorde had been dispatched specifically to hunt for Fortune, and even had a 60-man reinforcement to her crew for the battle. Fortune attempted to flee and Concorde gave chase, resulting in a race that lasted for several hours before Concorde overhauled her opponent. Le Même resisted fiercely before striking his colours at 22:15. Captain Wood treated his prisoner with great courtesy and returned to Bombay; Fortune, in poor state after the battle, limped in several dayslater.

== Fate ==
Le Même embarked on the East Indiaman Waltherstow, bound for England, which departed on 15 February 1805. Aboard, he fell ill and died of sickness on 30 March at 30S 79E.
