= French frigate Pomone (1785) =

36-gun frigate of the French Navy launched in 1785

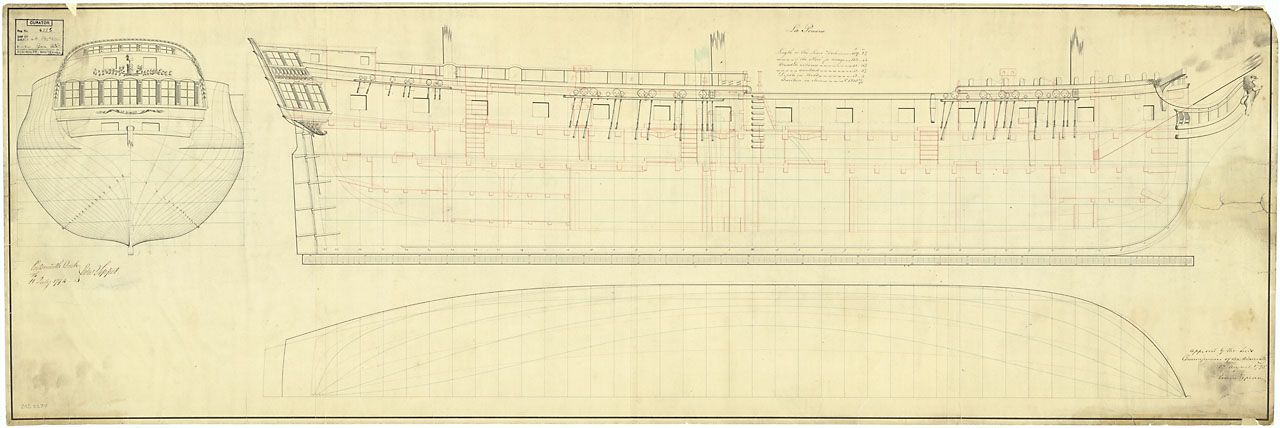
- Pomone

History

France
- Name: Pomone
- Namesake: Pomona
- Ordered: 13 April 1782 (named)
- Builder: Rochefort (Builders: Hubert Pennevert & Henri Chevillard)
- Laid down: 20 February 1783
- Launched: 16 November 1785
- In service: May 1787
- Captured: 23 April 1794

Great Britain
- Name: Pomone
- Acquired: 23 April 1794
- Fate: Sold in 1802

General characteristics
- Class & type: 36-gun frigate
- Displacement: 1400 tonneaux
- Tons burthen: 700 port tonneaux; 1,238 67/94
- Length: 48.7 m (160 ft);
- Beam: 12.2 m (40 ft)
- Draught: 5.1 m (17 ft)
- Propulsion: Sail
- Complement: French service: 325; British service: 300
- Armament: French service: Battery: 26 (later 28) × 18-pounders; Battery at capture: 26 × 24-pounder guns; Forecastle and quarterdeck: 6 (1794 - 12) × 8-pounder guns and 4 × 36-pounder obusiers; British service: Battery: 26 × 24-pounder guns; Battery 1799: 26 × 18-pounder guns; Fc: 4 × 32-pounders + 2 × 9-pounder guns; QD: 14 × 32-pounders (Note: Although the description in Winfield does not distinguish between guns and carronades, considerations of weight and stability make it most probable that the 32-pounders were carronades.)

Pomone was a 36-gun frigate of the French Navy, launched in 1785. The British captured her off the Île de Batz in April 1794 and incorporated her into the Royal Navy. Pomone subsequently had a relatively brief but active career in the British Navy off the Atlantic and Mediterranean coasts of France before suffering sufficient damage from hitting a rock. Due to this, the ship was taken out of service and then broken up in 1803.

== French service ==
Pomone was built to a one-off design by Baron Charles-Etienne Bombelle. After her capture, her design inspired that of the Royal Navy's Endymion-class frigates.

Between 17 February and 28 August 1793, Pomone was stationed at Rochefort under the command of captain de vaisseau Dumoutier. She cruised along the coasts of the Vendée and then arrived at Brest. Dumoutier continued in command in late September. From 26 February 1794 Pomone was at Cherbourg under the command of lieutenant de vaisseau Étienne Pévrieu. He sailed her from Cancale.

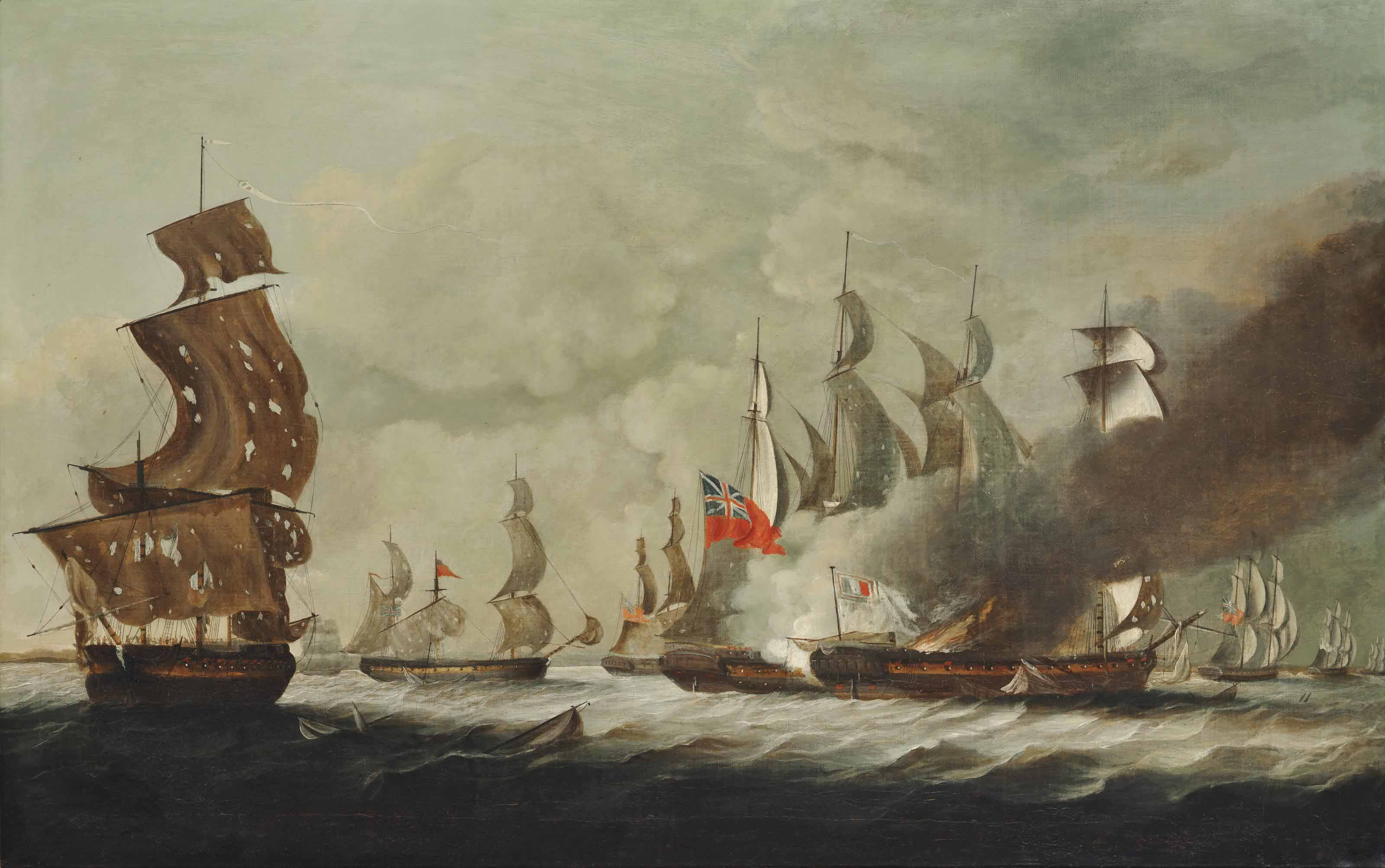
H.M. frigate Arethusa inflicting the final blows on the French frigate Pomone, 23 April 1794, off the Channel Islands. Painting by John Askew

The British captured her, along with Babet and Engageante, off the Île de Batz during the action of 23 April 1794.

== British service ==
She was recommissioned in the Royal Navy as HMS Pomone and the Endymion-class frigates were built to her lines, but with the more robust British practice of framing and fastening.

=== 1795 ===
On 6 and 17 January 1795, Pomone, under Captain Sir John Borlase Warren, with Arethusa, Concorde, Galatea and Diamond, captured the French vessels David and Ormontaise, and recaptured the Phoenix.

On 31 January, Pomone was part of a squadron that seized the Dutch East India Ship Ostenhuyson.

On 12 February, Pomone put to sea with a squadron comprising the frigates Anson, Artois and Galatea, and the hired lugger Duke of York. Anson lost her topsail mast in bad weather on the 14th so Warren sent her back to Plymouth.

On 18 February, the British squadron spotted three French transports. Warren followed them and on the 21st caught up with a convoy of 20 vessels under the escort of a frigate that he believed to be the French frigate Néréide. Warren pursued the convoy from the lighthouse on Île d'Oléron halfway up the Pertuis d'Antioche, capturing or destroying several of the vessels, before he had to break off the chase.

Then on 26 February, the squadron captured a schooner of eight brass guns off the Île de Groix, near Lorient. She was the American-built Curieuse (later corrected to Coureuse) and she was escorting a convoy of three brigs and two luggers. They were sailing from Nantes to Brest with clothing for the Army. (Note: The British took Coureuse into service briefly as a dispatch vessel in the Mediterranean. reports that Coureuse's guns were only 2-pounders. Coureuse was sold in 1799.)

Between 13 and 26 February, Warren's squadron captured and sent to England the following vessels: the sloop Petit Jean, the brig St. Pierre, the brig Deux Frères, the ship Petite Magdalène, the packet boat De Cayene, the schooner Curieuse (Coureuse), the lugger Liberté, the lugger Gloire, and the brig transport Biche. The squadron burned seven vessels: the schooner brig Désirée, the brig Three Friends, the brig Trois Frères, the brig Guerrier, the brig Liberté, the brig Espérance, and the lugger Patriote. The British scuttled four brigs:Graley, Jean et Marie, Pierre, and Anne. In all, Warren's squadron had taken nine prizes and destroyed 11 vessels.

On 15 April, Warren and his squadron chased the French privateer Jean Bart, of 26 guns and 187 men, off the Île de Ré. Artois made the actual capture. The next day Pomone, Artois, Anson and Galatea captured two vessels. Galatea captured Expédition, a corvette of 16 guns and 120 men, which had at one time been a British packet. The British also captured the Maria François Fidelle.

Off Belle Île, the squadron then caught up with a French convoy. The squadron burned and sank a brig and a sloop that were sailing in ballast. Artois captured two sloops with cargoes of fish. Later Artois reported that she had chased a ship and a brig from the convoy onto the rocks near the island of Hedic, where they were wrecked.

In June, Pomone participated at the landing of the ill-conceived and ill-fated Royalist expedition to Quiberon Bay. Pomone shared in the prize money for the capture, on 23 June, of the French men of war, Alexander, Formidable and Tigre.

On 2 September, Pomone caught Rude, of 12 guns, in Bourneaux Bay and burnt her. (Note: Rude was a brig-rigged gunboat launched on 15 November 1793 at Paimboeuf. The French had armed her with three 24-pounders from nearby fortifications. In 1794 she had participated in the reconquest of Noirmoutier from the Royalists.) However, there are discrepancies between the British and French records. French records show that the crew of Rude, of three guns (not 12), and under the command of enseigne de vaisseau non-entretenu Cheneau, ran her aground on Noirmoutier on 25 September to block the British from capturing her. The records do agree on the approximate location: Bourneaux Bay was a British name for Bourgneuf Bay, and Noirmoutier is on that bay.

On 15 October, Melampus and Latona, and later Orion and Thalia, and later still Pomone and Concorde, chased three French frigates, Tartu and Néréide, and the 50-gun frigate Forte, and the brig-aviso (or corvette) Éveillé. The British ships had to give up on the frigates due to the closeness of the shore. However, Pomone and the 74-gun third rate Thunderer, which had joined the chase, were able to take the Eveillé, of 18 guns, and 100 men. (Note: Éveillé had been launched at Bayonne in April 1788. The Royal Navy may have taken her into service, but she was never commissioned. She disappears from the records in 1796. When captured, Éveillé had on board Captain Gardiner, of the merchantman Esther, which the French had captured in October. A year earlier, Esther had repulsed an attack by the French corvette Republicaine.) The French force had been out for 60 days and had captured 12 West Indiamen, two of which, Kent and Albion, the British had already recaptured. Pomone and her squadron had recaptured Kent on 9 October. Orion recaptured Albion. Warren's squadron returned to England in December with the remnants of the expedition to Quiberon Bay.

=== 1796 ===
On 6 and 7 March 1796, the squadron captured Sultana and Nancy. Then on 11 and 13 March the squadron captured Harmony, Sans Peur and Agréable, on the coast of France. On the 15th, Pomone captured the 22-gun corvette Robuste, which had a crew of 145 men. She was sailing from Brest to L'Orient. The Royal Navy took Robuste into service as HMS Scourge.

Some two weeks later, on 20 March, Pomone, Artois, Anson, and Galatea engaged a French squadron escorting a convoy near the Bec du Raz. The British captured four brigs from the convoy and Warren instructed the lugger Valiant to take them to the nearest port. (The four brigs were Illier, Don de Dieu, Paul Edward, and Félicité.)

The British squadron then engaged the French warships escorting the convoy but were not able to bring them to a full battle before having to give up the chase due to the onset of dark and the dangerous location. Galatea was the only vessel in the British squadron to suffer casualties; she lost two men killed and six wounded. The store-ship Etoile, under the command of lieutenant de vaisseau Mathurin-Théodore Berthelin, struck. She was armed with thirty 12-pounder guns and had a crew of 160 men. Four French frigates, a corvette, a brig and the rest of the convoy escaped.

Another small convoy fell to Warren's squadron on 7 April also near the Bec du Raz. The squadron captured four brigs and a sloop, four of which they sent in to England. One brig they scuttled. All were carrying flour and corn. One sloop escaped, as did the aviso Voltigeur, of 16 guns, which was escorting the convoy. The four captured vessels were Marie, Union, Bonne, and a brig of unknown name. On 18 April the squadron captured Jean Marie.

On 25 May, Pomone captured the French privateer Fantaisie, of 14 guns and 75 men, near Morlaix. She was only one day out of port and had not captured anything.

Commodore Warren's squadron, including Pomone, ran the 44-gun French frigate Andromaque ashore on 23 August near the river Gironde. Boats from Galatea and Artois then boarded her. Some of Andromaque's crew had endeavored to get to shore, many drowning in the surf in the attempt. Warren's squadron took on board the captain, a number of the officers, many of her crew, and a number of Portuguese prisoners from two vessels that the French squadron to which Andromaque had belonged had taken. The 18-gun brig Sylph then destroyed the French vessel with gunfire.

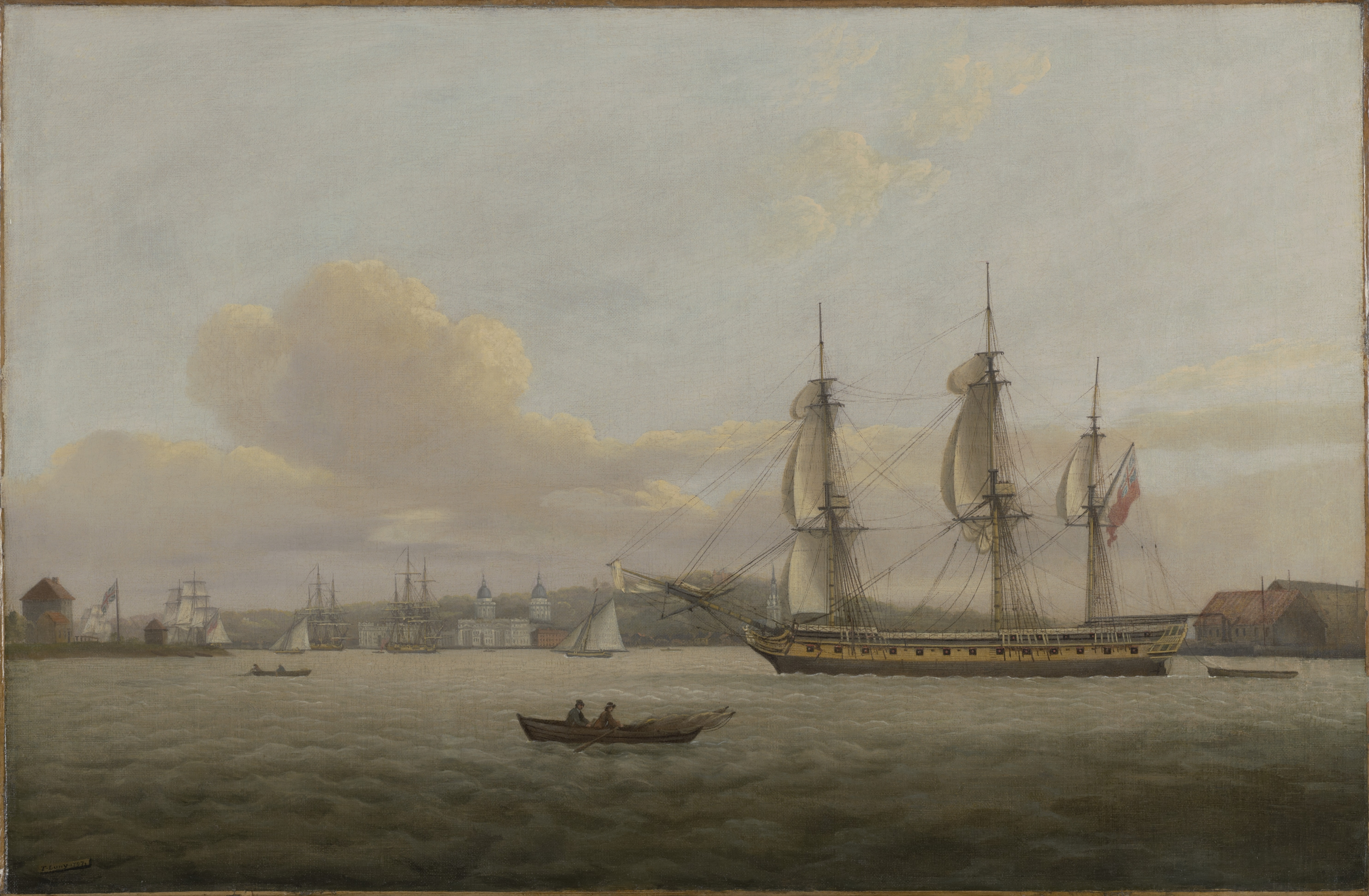
HMS Pomone off Greenwich, by Thomas Luny, 1797

Between 9 August and 10 September Warren's squadron captured or destroyed a number of small merchant vessels as well as Andromache. These were:

- Jean Porte, a gabarre, of 140 tons burthen.
- Jean de Blaignal, gabarre, of 140 tons.
- Liberté, chasse maree, of 95 tons.
- Catherine, chasse maree, of 80 tons.
- Marie Anne, chasse maree, of 95 tons.
- St. Pierre, chasse maree, of 90 tons.

All these were burnt at the mouth of the Garonne. The remaining three were captured.

- Charlotte, chasse maree, of 80 tons, loaded with wine and brandy.
- Véronique, chasse maree, 95 tons, loaded with wine and brandy.
- Sloop, loaded with canvas, taken by the lugger Argus and the cutter Dolly on their return from Plymouth to rejoin the squadron.

On 2 November, Thalia and Artois were in a chase that Pomone joined. Artois finally caught their quarry about 11 leagues from Ushant. The quarry turned out to be Franklin, armed with twelve 6-pounder guns and with a crew of 100 men.

=== 1797 ===
Between 24 January and 7 March, Warren's squadron sank or burnt four French vessels and two Spanish vessels. The French vessels were the sloops Providence and Intrépide, the brig Jenée, and another brig of unknown name. The Spanish vessels were the brigs Santa Theresa and St Jago de Compostella.

In July, Pomone and Warren's squadron intercepted a convoy in Hodierne Bay consisting of 14 cargo vessels with a frigate, a ship, a corvette, and a brig as escorts. The British drove the French 36-gun frigate Calliope onshore and holed her hull with gunfire, Sylph being particularly aggressive. The brig they sank with gunfire also. They burnt Freedom, a large British-built ship armed en flute and laden with squared timber. The French had run her onshore and the crew, with the wounded, had gotten away in their boats. The British also captured eight vessels:

- Thalia, a transport carrying an anchor weighing 6000 lbs., a crane, flour, bread, beef, pork, brandy, soldiers' clothing, etc.
- Brig, name unknown, laden with brandy and wine.
- Brig, name unknown, laden with brandy and salt.
- Brig, name unknown, laden with flour, biscuit and a mooring chain.
- Three chasse marees, name of unknown names, laden with brandy, wine and provisions.
- St. René, chasse maree, laden with coffee, sugar, etc.

A few days later, boats from the squadron destroyed two French merchant ships, the brig Fidèle and the sloop Henri, also in Hodierne Bay. The next day the squadron captured Boston. In August, the squadron destroyed one French vessel and captured another. On 28 August, the squadron chased and captured vessels from a French convoy. On 27 August Pomone ashore near Arcachon the French naval cutter Petit Diable, where she was lost. (Note: Petit Diable had been launched at Bayne in 1793 and was armed with twelve 4-pounder guns.)

=== 1798 ===
On 5 January, Pomone was 94 leagues off Ushant when she encountered a large ship which she pursued. In the haze, the quarry underestimated Pomone's size and armament and opened fire. The two vessels exchanged several broadsides before the quarry struck. She was the French privateer Chéri, from Nantes, and was armed with a mix of twenty-six 12, 18 and 24-pounder guns. She had a crew of 230 men under the command of Mons. Chaffin. The engagement cost Pomone one man killed and four wounded, plus damage to masts and rigging. Chéri had 12 men killed and 22 wounded, and had lost her mizzen mast and all sails, and had taken several holes to her hull as well. Reynolds took her in tow and sent over his carpenter to plug the holes when she started to sink. He sent over Pomone's boats and they were able to get everyone off Chéri, including the wounded, before she sank. Six days later, Pomone captured the French privateer Emprunt Fossé, of two guns, in the Channel.

In September, Pomone, HMS Argo, and HMS Cormorant convoyed a large fleet of merchantmen and transports to Lisbon. The convoy included the East Indiamen Royal Charlotte, Cuffnells, Phoenix, and Alligator. On 25 September the convoy encountered a French fleet of nine sail, consisting of one eighty-gun ship and eight frigates. The convoy commander signalled the Company's ships to form line of battle with the Royal Navy ships, and the convoy to push for Lisbon. This manoeuvre, and the warlike appearance of the Indiamen, deterred the French admiral from attacking them; the whole fleet reached Lisbon in safety.

=== 1799 ===
On 18 March, Pomone recaptured the West Indiaman Minerva, of Liverpool. She had been a prize to the French privateer brig Argus, of Bordeaux.

On 3 April, Pomone had the good fortune to meet and capture Argus after a pursuit of 108 miles that hit 12 knots. Argus was only six months old and was pierced for 22 guns, though she carried 18 brass 9-pounders. In addition to Minerva, Argus had captured two brigs from Teignmouth whose masters and crews were aboard her. Argus had a crew of 90 men.

Six days later Pomone recaptured an American schooner that had been sailing from Caracas to Corunna with a cargo of cocoa and indigo. She had had the misfortune to meet the French privateer Gironde on 1 April. Earlier, Pomone had captured two vessels off Cartagena, Spain, the French privateer Mucius Scaevola, of Genoa, and a Spanish coaster.

In April Pomone returned to Plymouth after having convoyed three ordnance transports to Minorca. She then went in for a refit.

=== 1801 ===
On 3 August, while cruising off the west side of Elba during the Siege of Porto Ferrajo, Pomone, Captain Edward Leveson-Gower commanding, took another prize, the Carrere, of 44 guns and 356 men. Pomone lost two men dead and three wounded, one of whom died of wounds shortly thereafter.

Less than a month later, on 2 September, the frigates Phoenix, Minerve and Pomone recaptured Success and destroyed the 46-gun frigate Bravoure. (The French had captured Success, a 32-gun frigate, in February, off Toulon.) In the middle of the month, men from Pomone were involved in operations ashore at Portoferraio, Elba.

Pomone shared with Vincejo, Pigmy, and the privateer Furioso in the proceeds of the capture on 2 October of the Bella Aurora.

=== 1802 ===
In April Pomone and Kangaroo escorted a convoy to the Mediterranean. She returned to Portsmouth on 16 July and then on 23 July sailed with a number of other ships for Lymington and Jersey to collect Dutch troops they were to carry to Cuxhaven.

== Fate ==
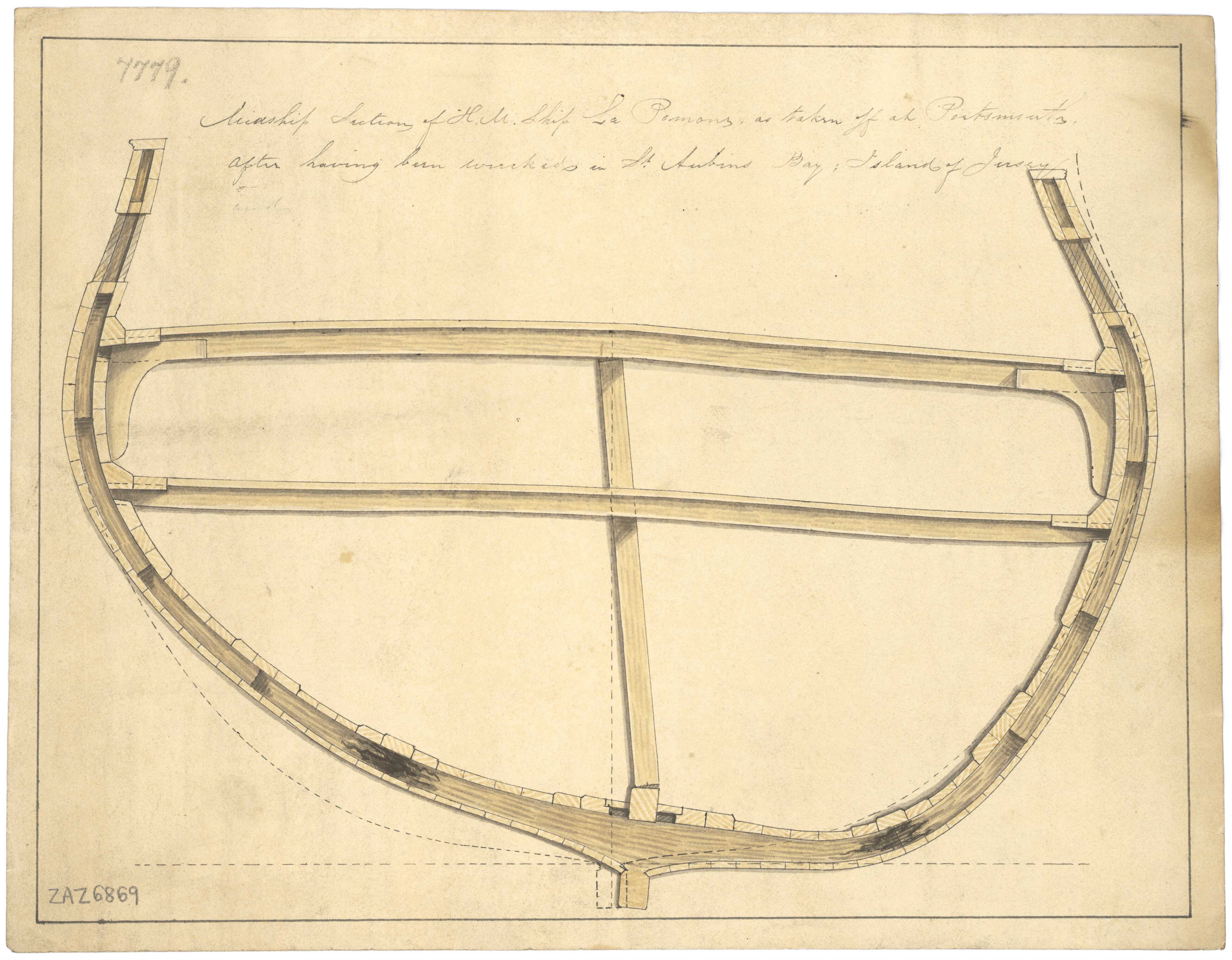
A plan taken off at Portsmouth Dockyard, illustrating the damage sustained to the hull framing after having been wrecked at St. Aubin's Bay, Jersey

On 23 September 1802, Pomone struck a rock while entering St. Aubin's Bay and sank. HMS Starling shuttled back and forth between Portsmouth and Jersey bringing back stores and taking out artificers. Pomone was refloated and towed into Portsmouth in October but was not worth repairing. On 31 October HMS Alonzo arrived from Jersey with more stores.

A court martial on 27 October on Neptune in Portsmouth Harbour, tried the pilot, John Geram, for her loss. The court ruled that he should not have attempted to enter the bay at night as he could have safely waited at sea until daylight. The court fined him all pay and allowances due to him for his services as pilot on Pomone and sentenced him to imprisonment in the Marshalsea for three months.

Pomone was broken up in 1803.

== See also ==
- List of ships captured in the 18th century
