= George Murray (Royal Navy officer, born 1759) =

Royal Navy Vice-Admiral (1759–1819)

Vice-Admiral Sir George Murray KCB
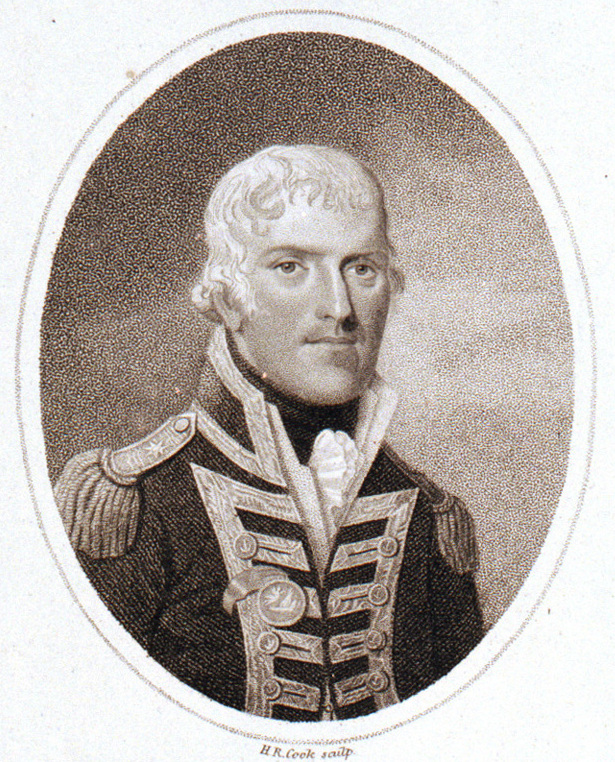
- Born: January 1759; Chichester
- Died: 28 February 1819 (aged 60); Chichester
- Military career
- Allegiance: United Kingdom of Great Britain and Ireland
- Branch: Royal Navy
- Service years: 1770–1819
- Rank: Vice-Admiral
- Commands: HMS Combustion; HMS San Carlos; HMS Triton; HMS Nymphe; HMS Formidable; HMS Colossus; HMS Achille; HMS Edgar; HMS Spartiate
- Conflicts: American Revolutionary War; Battle of Porto Praya; Battle of Sadras; Battle of Providien; Battle of Negapatam; Battle of Trincomalee; Battle of Cuddalore; French Revolutionary Wars; Action of 23 April 1794; Battle of Groix; Battle of Cape St Vincent; Battle of Copenhagen; Napoleonic Wars; British invasions of the Río de la Plata
- Awards: Knight Commander of the Order of the Bath; Naval Gold Medal

Vice-Admiral Sir George Murray KCB (January 1759 – 28 February 1819) was an officer in the Royal Navy who saw service in a wide range of theatres and campaigns. His active naval career spanned the American War of Independence and the French Revolutionary and Napoleonic Wars. Murray served under many of the most notable commanders of his age and participated in several of their greatest victories. He was with Parker and Howe in the West Indies and North America, Johnstone and Hughes in the East Indies, Jervis at Cape St Vincent, Nelson at Copenhagen, and took part in a host of other actions and engagements. Temporarily a captive of the French he was a keen scholar and spent time learning the French language and their naval customs, as well as being a competent surveyor, experience that was to help him in later life. He had a particularly enduring friendship with Nelson, who personally requested his services as his captain of the fleet. It was only chance that prevented Murray from serving as such at Trafalgar. With Murray absent, Nelson declined to appoint a replacement, one biographer reasoning that "none but Murray would do".

== Family and early life ==
George Murray was born in Chichester in January 1759. His father was Gideon Murray, Alderman of that city. He began his naval career at the age of 11, when he was entered in the books of Captain Francis Banks's HMS Niger, which was serving in the Mediterranean, as a captain's servant. His proper service in the navy probably began in 1772, when he joined HMS Panther, the flagship of Commodore Molyneux Shuldham, for service on the Newfoundland Station. He then transferred to the flagship of John Montagu, the 50-gun HMS Romney, and again in time to join Sir Peter Parker's flagship HMS Bristol for the attack on Sullivan's Island on 28 June 1776. He moved into HMS Chatham after this and continued to serve with Parker along the North American coast, participating in the occupation of Rhode Island in December 1776. After receiving favourable reports of his conduct, Vice-Admiral Lord Howe requested Murray's services and he was transferred to HMS Eagle. Murray went on to see action in Howe's campaigns to disrupt the French fleet under comte d'Estaing in the summer of 1778.

== Home waters ==
Howe and Murray returned to England in 1778. Howe was disaffected by his experiences of command in North America, and consequently did not bestow patronage on those junior officers under his command, as was the custom. Instead a friend of Murray's father, Captain George Montagu arranged for him to draw up a record of his service and good conduct in the North American campaign, which was then passed on to the First Lord of the Admiralty, John Montagu, 4th Earl of Sandwich. He passed his lieutenant's examination on 19 November 1778, and quickly received his commission on 31 December that year. He was to be second lieutenant aboard the 32-gun HMS Arethusa, under Captain Charles Holmes Everitt. It was to be a short-lived appointment as on 19 March 1779 she ran aground and was wrecked on the Breton coast while chasing a French frigate. Murray was captured and became a prisoner of war, spending the next two years in captivity and occupying himself with the study of the French language and naval regulations. He was released and exchanged when he came to the attention of the French authorities after chastising an American privateersman for wearing a British uniform.

== East Indies ==
Murray had made it back to England by early 1781 and received an appointment to the 64-gun HMS Monmouth as her first lieutenant. The Monmouth, commanded by fellow townsman James Alms, set sail to the East Indies in April 1781. Murray also took part in the Battle of Porto Praya against the Bailli de Suffren, and went on to face him again with Sir Edward Hughes's fleet off the coast of India at the Battle of Sadras on 15 February 1782, and at the Battle of Providien on 12 April 1782. Murray moved aboard Hughes's flagship, the 74-gun HMS Superb shortly after the engagement at Providien, and went on to take part in the battles of Negapatam and Trincomalee, being wounded in the latter.

Murray received his first command on 9 October 1782, that of the fireship HMS Combustion, but he was promoted to post-captain three days later and appointed to the 22-gun storeship and former Spanish privateer HMS San Carlos. He remained with her during the last engagement between Hughes and de Suffren, the Battle of Cuddalore on 20 June 1783, after which he was transferred to the 64-gun HMS Inflexible for his return to England.

== Years of peace ==
Without active employment following the Peace of Paris and the end of the American War of Independence, Murray spent several years in study, residing in France for a two-year period in order to refine his language skills. The Nootka Crisis in June 1790 led to Murray's return to service in command of the 32-gun frigate HMS Triton. He continued in her for the next few years, and by April 1791 he was occupied in surveying the Great Belt, and the approaches into Copenhagen. He spent the remainder of the peace serving at Halifax and Jamaica, returning to England in June 1793 after the outbreak of the French Revolutionary Wars.

== French Revolutionary Wars ==
He was appointed to the 36-gun HMS Nymphe in March 1794 and went on to serve as part of Sir John Borlase Warren's squadron. He was present at the action of 23 April 1794 off Guernsey, where Warren's four frigates fought an engagement with three French frigates and a corvette, capturing two frigates and the corvette. He was still in command a year later when he and the Nymphe were engaged in Lord Bridport's victory at the Battle of Groix on 23 June 1795. He took advantage of a brief period of shore leave after this to marry Ann Teesdale on 15 September 1795, but was back at sea two weeks later, in command of the 90-gun HMS Formidable.

=== Jervis and Cape St Vincent ===
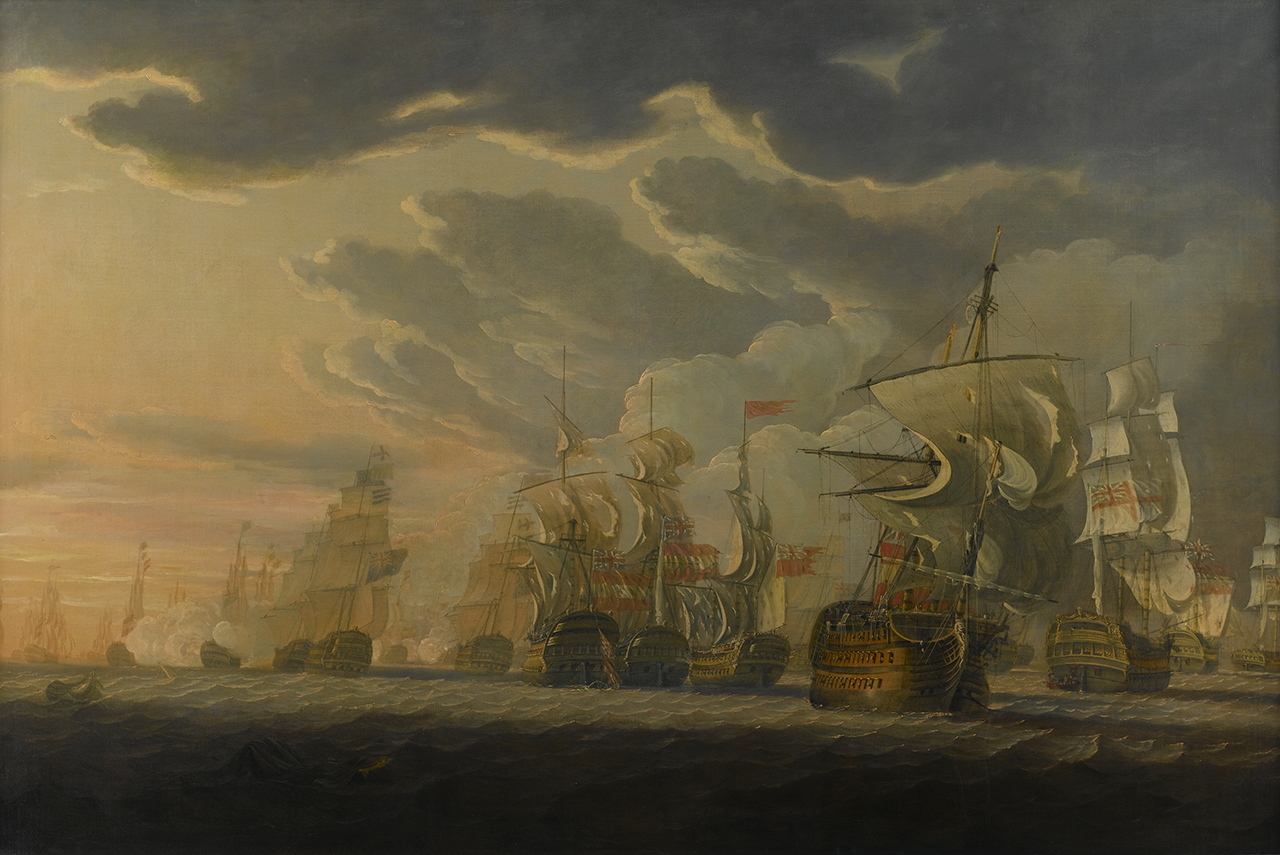
The Battle of Cape St Vincent, 14 February 1797 by Robert Cleveley. Murray's ship Colossus was damaged early in the engagement.

Murray's next assignment was to take command of the 74-gun HMS Colossus in 1796. He sailed to join Sir John Jervis's fleet and took up station commanding the inshore squadron blockading Cádiz. While there the Spanish admiral of the port invited Murray to attend a bullfight, offering his nephew as a temporary guarantee of Murray's safety. Murray saw action at the Battle of Cape St Vincent on 14 February 1797, where he and Colossus formed up near the centre of the British line. As the British ships broke through the Spanish line and tacked around to engage their van, Spanish Vice-Admiral Joaquin Moreno in the rear saw an opportunity to exploit a weakness in the British formation. Pulling forward in his flagship Principe de Asturias he came across the bows of the British line, cutting between HMS Orion, which had already tacked, and HMS Colossus, which was just preparing to. He then fired a broadside at the vulnerable bows of Colossus, damaging her main foreyard and causing her to miss stays. She began to drift out of the line while Murray and his crew struggled to regain manoeuvrability. Seeing her predicament, Orion dropped back to cover Colossus with a broadside. Despite this setback Colossus only sustained five wounded during the course of the battle, which ended in a British victory.

=== Loss of the Colossus ===
Murray continued to serve with Jervis until he was despatched to join Horatio Nelson in the Mediterranean. He rendezvoused with him at Naples, but the Colossus was by now so worn out that Nelson sent Murray back to Britain as a convoy escort, and carrying a cargo of artefacts from Sir William Hamilton's collection. The Colossus reached the Channel safely but a north-east gale blew up, forcing Murray to seek shelter in the waters off the Isles of Scilly. He initially anchored in St Marys Roads but the storm worsened and her anchors dragged, and on 7 December 1798 she ran onto a ledge of rocks and was wrecked. There was one casualty in the sinking, and many of Sir William Hamilton's treasures in his collection were lost with her. A court-martial was convened, at which Murray was honourably acquitted of blame and assigned to command the 84-gun HMS Achille with the Channel Fleet. In March 1801 he was moved to the 74-gun HMS Edgar and assigned to Sir Hyde Parker's Baltic expedition, where it was anticipated that his previous experience in the Baltic would be an asset.

=== Nelson and Copenhagen ===
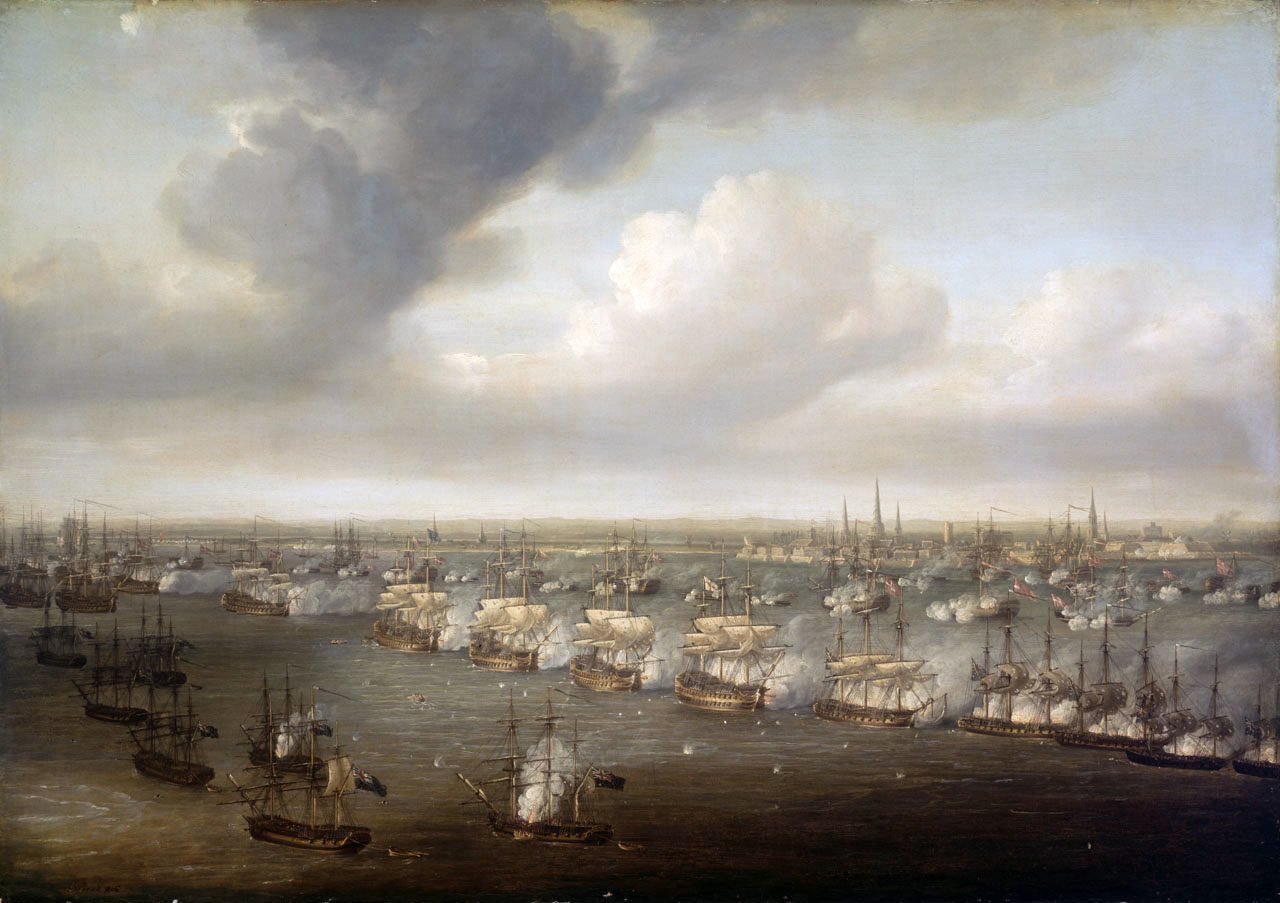
The Battle of Copenhagen, as painted by Nicholas Pocock. Murray was instrumental in leading Nelson's force into the harbour.

Detached with Nelson's expeditionary squadron for the expeditionary assault on Copenhagen on 2 April, Murray was given the task of leading the British force into the harbour, using channels he had helped to chart a decade earlier. She eventually passed by four Danish ships, taking fire from each one, before anchoring opposite the Jylland, which she engaged for the next four hours of the battle. By the time the truce was concluded, the Edgar had taken casualties of 31 killed and 104 wounded. During the peace negotiations with the Danish, and the subsequent foray to watch the Swedish forces at Karlskrona, Murray developed a strong rapport with Nelson, who had replaced Parker after the latter's recall to Britain.

=== Captain of the fleet ===
With the resumption of hostilities after the Peace of Amiens, Murray returned to sea in command of the 74-gun HMS Spartiate, but word soon reached him that Nelson had requested that Murray be his captain of the fleet in the Mediterranean. Murray was initially reluctant to accept the offer, and on being asked why, replied that

the nature of the service was such, as very frequently terminated in disagreement between the admiral and the captain; and he should be extremely unwilling to hazard any possible thing that should diminish the regard and respect which he should ever entertain for his lordship.

Nelson's response was to express agreement with Murray that such situations could occur, but reminded him that

on whatever he [Murray] might be called, or whatever measure he might be directed to carry into execution, he never should forget the intimacy which subsisted between them; and even, should anything go contrary to his wishes, he would wave the rank of admiral, and explain, or expostulate with him, as his friend, Murray.

Murray then accepted the post, and remained with Nelson as his captain of the fleet during the blockade of Toulon between 1803 and 1805, and the subsequent chase of Villeneuve and his fleet to the West Indies and back in 1805. He had been promoted to rear-admiral on 23 April 1804, but declined to raise his flag so as to be able to continue on with Nelson. The fleet returned to England in August 1805, where Murray learnt that his father-in-law had died, leaving him as executor of his estates. While Nelson sailed to take up command of the fleet blockading Cádiz, Murray was compelled to remain in England and attend to family affairs. Nelson did not therefore have a captain of the fleet at Trafalgar, for as one biographer stated "none but Murray would do".

=== Later service ===
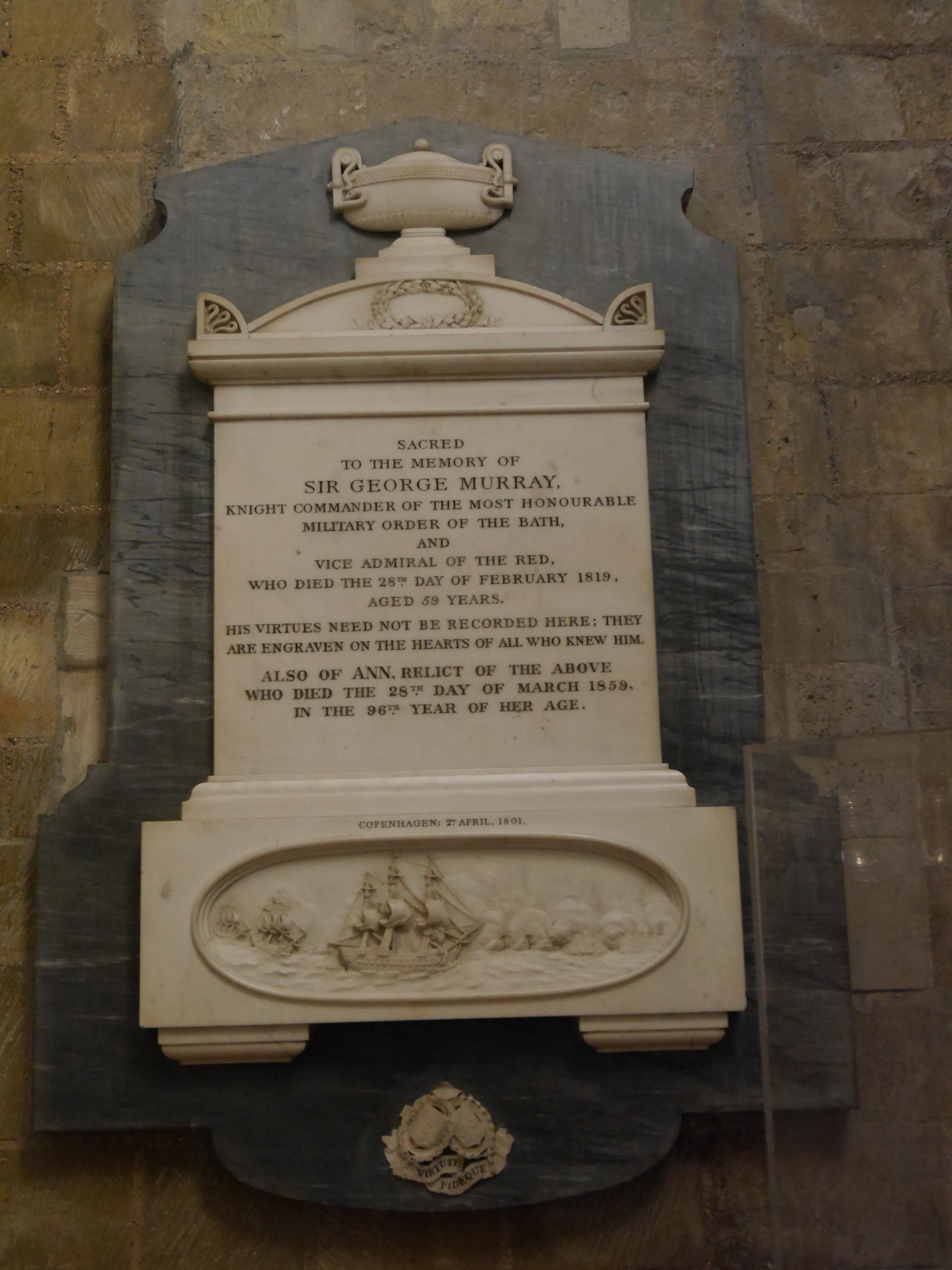
Memorial, Chichester Cathedral

Murray's last operational command was in November 1806, when he was assigned as commander-in-chief of the naval forces involved in the operations to capture Buenos Aires, supporting General John Whitelocke's soldiers. Murray and the naval forces were for the most part limited to conveying troops, and subsequently organising their evacuation. He returned home in January 1808, and was promoted to vice-admiral on 25 October 1809. A nomination to be a Knight Commander of the Order of the Bath followed on 2 January 1815 and later the same year he was elected Mayor of Chichester.

He died suddenly at his home in Chichester on 28 February 1819. His obituary reported that he had gone to bed "in good health, and was seized by a spasmodic affectation in his chest, which terminated his existence at 8 o'clock". The Naval Chronicle declared that

Admiral Murray's disposition is so gentle, and his manners are so mild, that but few men are equally well beloved in the navy; while few possess the facility of commanding with such ease, and, at the same time, with such energy and effect.

His wife Ann outlived him by a considerable number of years. She died in Boulogne in 1859, at the age of 95.
