= Walter Boyd (1796 ship) =

History

Dutch East India Company
- Name: Oosthuizen
- Builder: Hoorn shipyard
- Launched: 1789
- Fate: Seized by the British December 1795

Great Britain
- Name: Walter Boyd
- Namesake: Walter Boyd (financier)
- Owner: Calcleugh & Co., London
- Acquired: c.1796 by purchase of a prize
- Fate: Foundered September 1801

General characteristics
- Tons burthen: 759, or 792, (bm)
- Length: 140 Amsterdam voet (approx.93 ft (28 m))
- Propulsion: Sail
- Complement: 1796: 35; 1801: 62
- Armament: 1796: 20 × 9&6&4-pounder guns; 1801: 28 × 6&9&12-pounder guns + 4 swivel guns
- Notes: Dutch records refer to her as being of 880 tons

Walter Boyd was the East Indiaman Oosthuizen of the Dutch East India Company. Oosthuizen was launched in 1789 and made one voyage to the Far East. She was on her second voyage in 1794 when the British seized her. In 1795 British interests purchased her and named her Walter Boyd. She made one voyage for the British East India Company. She then became a West Indiaman. On her last voyage, in 1801, Walter Boyd captured a Spanish schooner but then foundered on the way back to London from Martinique.

== Oosthuizen ==
Oosthuizen was built in 1789 by the Hoorn shipyard for the Hoorn chamber of the Dutch East India Company. The Hoorn chamber was probably the first of the chambers to adopt copper sheathing for (Dutch) East Indiamen, and she may have been coppered.

Captain Gerrit Scheler sailed from the Texel on 17 December 1791. Oosthuizen arrived at the Cape on 3 April 1792, and Batavia on 9 July. She returned to the Netherlands via China. She left China on 3 December, arrived at the Cape of Good Hope on 14 March 1793, left on 1 April, and arrived at Texel on 27 July

On 22 December 1794 Captain Scheler again sailed from the Texel, bound for China. This was some weeks before the French invaded the Netherlands. Nevertheless, when Oosthuizen called at the Isles of Scilly some six days later the British put her under an embargo. On 31 January 1795 a squadron under Captain Sir John Borlase Warren detained the Dutch East India Ship Ostenhuyson.

A year later, in December 1795, the English confiscated Oosthuizen. They auctioned her off for £9000, and Calcleugh & Co., London, purchased her and renamed her Walter Boyd.

== Walter Boyd ==
Captain James McCulloch acquired a letter of marque on 4 June 1796. McCulloch sailed from Portsmouth on 12 August, bound for the Cape, Madras, and Bengal. Walter Boyd reached the Cape on 18 November and Madras on 12 February 1797. She arrived at Kedgeree on 28 February. She was at Diamond Harbour on 28 March and left on 31 August. Homeward bound, she left Kedgeree on 17 September, reached the Cape on 22 December and Saint Helena on 31 March 1798. She was at Cork on 24 June, and arrived in the Downs on 8 July.

On her return Walter Boyd became a West Indiaman. On 30 September 1800, Walter Boyd ran down the transport Nelly in Cadiz Bay.

Captain William Davis acquired a letter of marque on 13 January 1801. Lloyd's List reported on 14 July that he had arrived at Barbados after having captured the Spanish schooner Francis de Paola, which had been sailing from Cape Verde to Teneriffe with a cargo of cotton, tobacco, and hides. Walter Boyd had been sailing from Portsmouth and Madeira at the time.

== Fate ==
Walter Boyd foundered on 4 September 1801 in a gale on passage from Martinique for London. At the time she had a schooner alongside that also foundered.
