= French frigate Engageante =

Age of Sail frigates of France

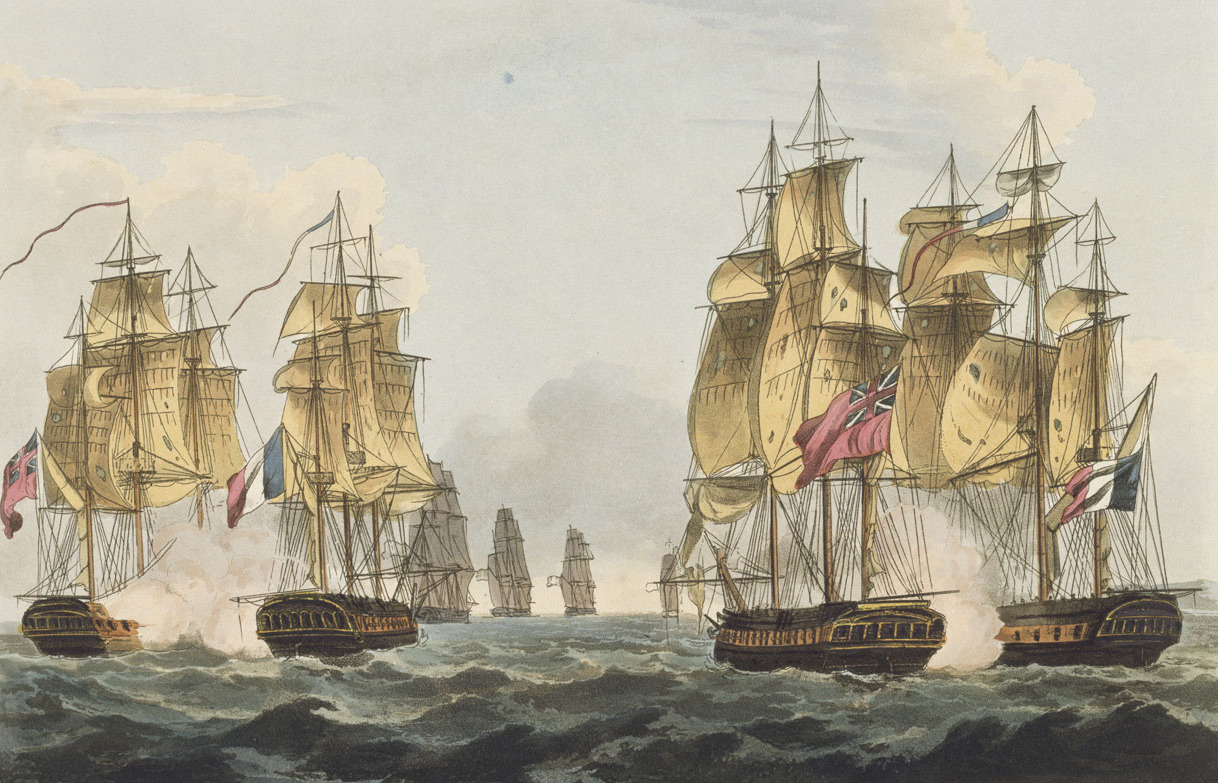
- Engageante at the action of 23 April 1794

History

France
- Name: Engageante
- Builder: Toulon dockyard (constructeur: Joseph Chapelle)
- Laid down: October 1765
- Launched: 27 September 1766
- In service: April 1768
- Captured: 23 April 1794

Great Britain
- Name: HMS Engageante
- Acquired: 23 April 1794
- Fate: Broken up in May 1811

General characteristics
- Displacement: 1010 tonneaux
- Tons burthen: 600 port tonneaux; 930 77/94 (bm)
- Length: 45.5 m (149 ft)
- Beam: 11.5 m (38 ft)
- Draught: 4.7 m (15 ft)
- Propulsion: Sail
- Complement: French service: 190 (later 250); British hospital ship:70
- Armament: French service: UD:26 × 12-pounder guns; QD/Fc: 6 × 6-pounder guns; 4 × 36-pounder obusiers added in 1794; British service: 8 × 4-pounder guns

Engageante was a 32-gun frigate of the French Navy. The only ship of her class, she was built to a design by the shipwright Jean-François Etienne and launched in 1766. The British captured her in the action of 23 April 1794 and converted her to the hospital ship HMS Engageante. She was broken up in 1811.

== French service ==
Engageante was built in Toulon to a design by Jean-François Etienne. She was the sole ship of her class.

From July 1778, Engageante was under the command of Captain Gras-Préville. On 5 July 1778, as Engageante was scouting in front of D'Estaing's squadron, she detected the 26-gun British privateer frigate Rose, under Captain James Duncan. (Note: Rose was armed with twenty]two 6-pounder guns and four 9-pounder bow and stern chase guns. She had a crew of about 100 men.) Engageante gave chase and caught up with her quarry around 2000hrs. The battle lasted until 0100hrs of 6 July, by which time Rose had been reduced to a wreck and struck her colours. Engageante returned to her squadron to report on the event; deeming Rose irretrievable, the French scuttled her.

Engageante took part in the Battle of St. Lucia on 15 December 1778.

In February 1779, Engageante departed Toulon for America, where she arrived in late March, but had to be quarantined. In April 1779, she escorted a convoy from Martinique to France, successfully fending off a British attack.

From 1781, she took part in the American Revolutionary War, including the Hudson Bay Expedition in 1782, with Astrée and the 74-gun Sceptre. The copper sheathing of the ships made them especially vulnerable in arctic waters, and Engageante suffered the most, damaging her bow so much that she had to call into Cadiz for repair. The crew also suffered from scurvy: by the time Engageante arrived in Europe, all had been affected; around 100 were too sick to work, and 15 had died.

== Capture ==
Engageante was captured, along with Pomone and Babet, off the Île de Batz during the action of 23 April 1794. Her captor was HMS Concorde. On Engageante 30 to 40 men were killed or wounded. On Concorde one man was killed and 12 were wounded. In the evening after the action Engageante's masts fell overboard, and Concorde's masts were kept upright only with great difficulty.

== British service ==
Engageante was subsequently recommissioned in the Royal Navy and registered as the hospital ship HMS Engageante on 27 July 1794.

She was commissioned at Cork in February 1795 under Lieutenant William Fry. She served for a while as Vice-Admiral Robert Kingsmill's flagship.

In 1796 Lieutenant Henry Parker replaced Fry, but drowned in January 1797. In 1798 Fry returned to command, but he died in 1801. In 1801 Lieutenant Barrington Mansfield assumed command, only to die within the year.

In June 1802 Glenmore escorted Engageante, Lieutenant Donocliff, to Plymouth. There Engageante became a hospital ship; later she was a receiving ship at Cork. Although it was expected that Engageante would be broken up at Plymouth, that did not take place for almost a decade.

== Fate ==
Engageante was broken up at Plymouth in May 1811.
