= HMS Babet =

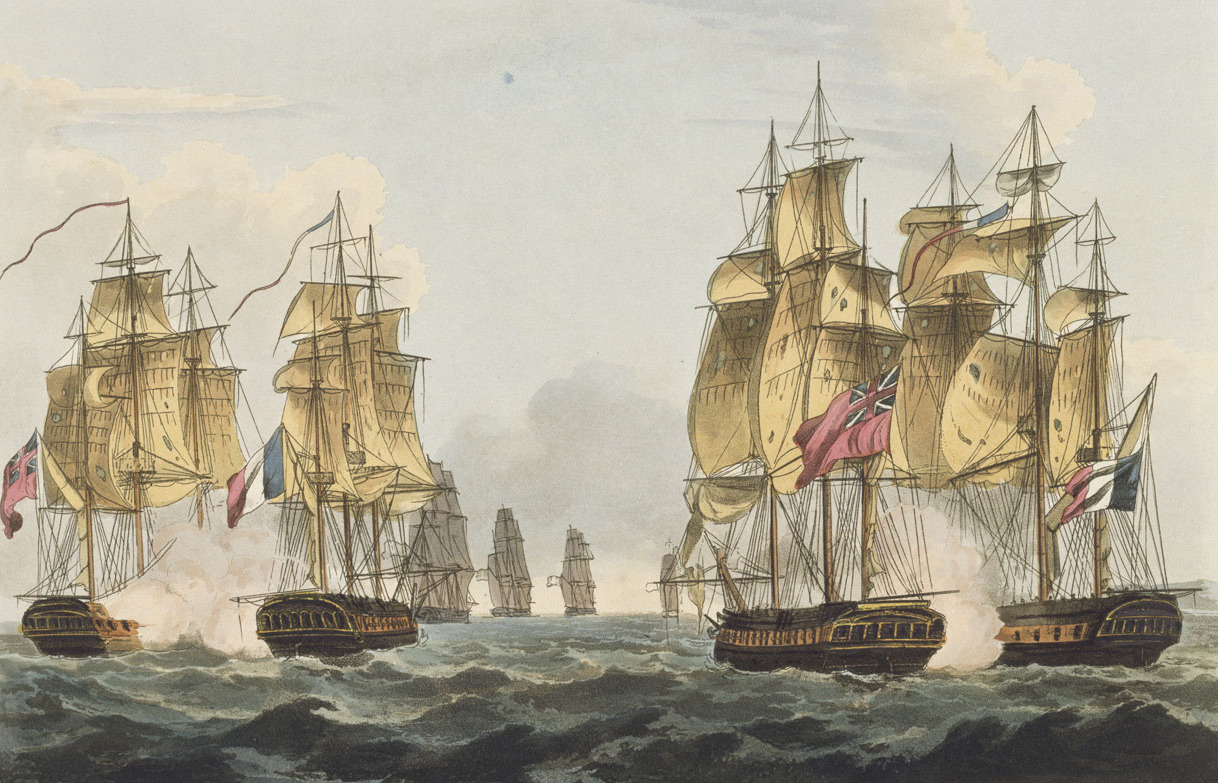
- Babet at the action of 23 April 1794

History

France
- Name: Babet
- Builder: Pierre Mauger
- Laid down: September 1792
- Launched: 12 February 1793
- Commissioned: May 1793
- Captured: By April 1794

Great Britain
- Name: HMS Babet
- Acquired: April 1794 by capture
- Commissioned: December 1794
- Honours and awards: Naval General Service Medal with clasp "23rd June 1795"
- Fate: Lost at sea in October/November 1800

General characteristics
- Class & type: 20-gun sixth-rate post ship
- Type: Prompte-clas corvette
- Displacement: 603 tons (French)
- Tons burthen: 511 1/94 (bm)
- Length: 119 ft 1 in (36.3 m) (overall); 91 ft 8 in (27.9 m) (keel)
- Beam: 31 ft 1 in (9.5 m)
- Depth of hold: 9 ft 4 1/2 in (2.9 m)
- Sail plan: Full-rigged ship

General characteristics (French service)
- Complement: some 178 men (c. 200 at capture)
- Armament: Originally: 20 to 26 × 8-pounder guns; Later: 20 or 22 × 6-pounder guns + 4 × 4-pounder guns; At capture: 22 × 9-pounder guns

General characteristics (British service
- Complement: 165 men (later 170)
- Armament: UD: 20 × 9-pounder guns; QD: 6 × 12-pounder carronades; Fc: 2 × 12-pounder carronades

HMS Babet was a 20-gun sixth-rate post ship of the Royal Navy. She was launched as Babet, a corvette of the French Navy, and was captured by the British navy at the action of 23 April 1794 during the War of the First Coalition. As HMS Babet, she captured several French privateers and other vessels, and fought at the Battle of Groix. She disappeared with all hands in the Caribbean in 1800, presumably having foundered during bad weather.

== French career and capture ==
Babet was built at Le Havre, one of a two-ship Prompte class of 20-gun corvettes built to a design by Joseph-Marie-Blaise Coulomb.

In the Bay of Biscay, on 18 May 1793, Captain Andrew Snape Douglas's HMS Phaeton captured her sister, Prompte, which the Royal Navy took into service as HMS Prompte. (Note: 20041996) Babet was laid down in September 1792, fitted out in May 1793 and launched on 12 December 1793. (Note: Winfield reports that she was launched on 12 February 1794. However, French records indicate that by that time she had already been to sea.)

Her commander from 9 January 1793 to October was lieutenant de vaisseau Rolland. Rolland's replacement on 23 October was enseigne de vaisseau non entretenu Pierre-Joseph-Paul Belhomme.

Babet's French career was brief. Under Belhomme's command she sailed from Havre to Cherbourg via La Hogue. She then cruised the Channel before sailing from Honfleur to Cherbourg, on to Brest, and returning to Cancale. She was part of a squadron consisting of two frigates (Pomone and Engageante) and another corvette that a British squadron under John Borlase Warren engaged off the Île de Batz in the action of 23 April 1794. HMS Flora and HMS Arethusa captured Babet and brought her into Portsmouth, arriving on 30 April. The action had cost Babet some 30 to 40 of her crew killed and wounded. Flora had one man killed and three wounded; Arethusa had three men killed and five wounded.

== British career ==
Babet was registered for service on 19 June 1794, and was commissioned in December that year under Captain the Honourable John Murray, for service with Lord Howe's fleet. Captain Joshua Mulock replaced Murray in April 1795 while Babet was being fitted for service at Portsmouth, a process completed on 10 May that year, having cost £2,544. Captain Edward Codrington replaced Mulock; Babet was Codrington's first command after he had made post captain

Codrington then sailed Babet to join Lord Bridport's fleet. On 23 June 1795 she was with the fleet at the battle of Groix. In 1847, the Admiralty awarded any remaining survivors who claimed it, the Naval General Service Medal with clasp "23rd June 1795".

Captain William Lobb replaced Codrington in December 1795 and sailed Babet to the Leeward Islands in February the following year. There Babet was present at the capture of Demerara on 23 April, and the capture of Berbice on 2 May 1796.

In July 1796, Babet, Prompte, Scipio and Pique captured the Catherina Christina in July 1796. At some point Babet sailed in company with Prompte and the two vessels captured the Danish brig Eland Fanoe. On 23 July, Scipio, Babet, Pique and Prompte shared in the capture of the Ariel and the Zee Nymphe.

On 16 September Thorn, Scipio and Babet captured the John and Mary. The first, fourth and fifth-class shares of the prize money were shared, by agreement, with Madras and Prompte. Thorn captured the schooner Abigail on 24 September. This time the first, fourth and fifth-class shares were shared with Scipio, Babet, Madras and Prompte. Then on 16 November Thorn and Resource captured the Spanish schooner Del Carmen. Once again the first, fourth and fifth class shares were shared with Scipio, Babet, Madras and Prompte.

On 10 January 1797, Babet and Bellona drove a small French privateer schooner ashore on Deseada. They tried to use the privateer Legere, of six guns and 48 men, which Bellona had captured three days earlier, to retrieve the schooner that was on shore. In the effort, both French privateers were destroyed. Then Babet chased a brig, which had been a prize to the schooner, ashore. The British were unable to get her off so they destroyed her. Babet and Bellona were paid headmoney in 1828, more than 30 years later.

Captain Jemmett Mainwaring took command of Babet in June 1797. Between 25 July and 5 October Babet captured three merchant vessels:

- brig Decision (or Decisive or Maria), of 200 tons and eight men, recaptured while sailing from Cape to Puerto Rico in ballast;
- brig Schylhill (probably Schuylkill), of Philadelphia, of 100 tons and eight men, sailing from New York to Puerto Rico with a cargo of flour, supposedly Spanish property; and
- barque Æolus, of Copenhagen and of 180 tons and 10 men, sailing from Marseilles to St. Thomas, with a cargo of wine, French property.

Then on 16 January 1798 Babet's boats captured the French schooner Désirée. The schooner was sailing towards Babet as Babet was sailing between Martinique and Dominique. As soon as the schooner realized that Babet was a British warship she attempted to escape. The wind failed and the schooner then took to her sweeps. Lieutenant Samuel Pym of Babet took 24 men in her pinnace and launch and went after the schooner. After rowing several leagues the boats closed to within range of their cannon, which they then commenced to fire. The British closed on their quarry despite a strong counter-fire. The British then boarded Désirée and took her. She was armed with six guns and had a crew of 46 men. The British lost one man killed and five wounded; the French had three men killed and 15 wounded. Désirée was six days out of Guadeloupe and had taken one American brig that had been sailing from St. Vincent to Boston.

Babet was refitted at Portsmouth between July and December 1798 at a cost of £5,194. Then, in December she recaptured the American ship Helena.

On 18 and 19 January 1799, Babet captured two French fishing vessels, Deux Freres Unis, with a cargo of herring, and the Jacques Charles. On 3 June Babet was in company with Harpy when they captured the John. Then on 24 June they captured the ship Weloverdagt.

Then Babet took part in the Anglo-Russian invasion of Holland in 1799. There she briefly served as Vice-Admiral Andrew Mitchell's flagship in the Zuider Zee. On 28 August 1799, the fleet captured several Dutch hulks and ships in the New Diep, in Holland. Babet was listed among the vessels qualifying to share in the prize money. However, by the time this was awarded in February 1802, Babet had been lost at sea. Similarly, Babet was also present at the subsequent Vlieter Incident on 30 August.

Babet was among the numerous vessels that shared in the proceeds after Dart cut out the French frigate Desirée from Dunkirk harbour on 8 July 1800.

== Fate ==
Babet left Spithead on 14 September 1800, arrived at Fort Royal Bay, Martinique, on 24 October, and sailed the next day for Jamaica. She was not seen again; she had probably foundered at sea during a tropical storm. (Note: Two key sources give the year as 1801, but other evidence makes clear that these references have shifted the loss by a year, possibly reflecting when the Admiralty had formally acknowledged her loss. Perhaps most tellingly, there is no mention of Babet in Lloyd's List's ship arrival and departure data after July 1800.)

General John Knox was a passenger on Babet. He was sailing out to Jamaica to take up the position of governor. With him were his aide-de-camp, and possibly some other members of his entourage or other passengers.

== See also ==
- List of people who disappeared mysteriously at sea
- List of ships captured in the 18th century
