= John Borlase Warren =

Royal Navy officer, politician and diplomat (1753–1822)

Admiral The Right Honourable Sir John Borlase Warren GCB Bt GCH
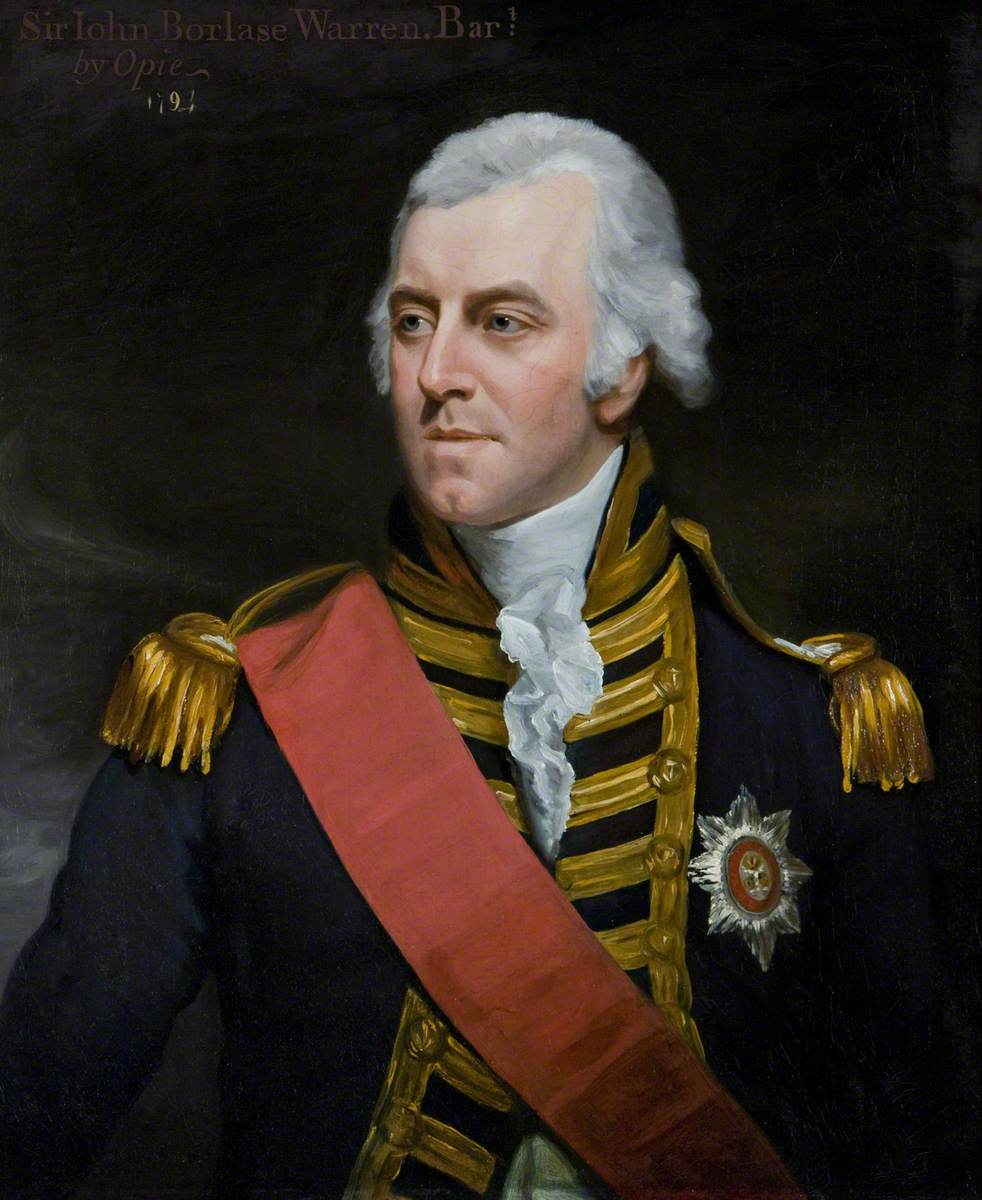
- Portrait by John Opie, 1794
- Born: 2 September 1753; Stapleford, Nottinghamshire,
- Died: 27 February 1822 (aged 68); Greenwich Hospital, London
- Alma mater: Winchester College; Emmanuel College, Cambridge
- Spouse: Caroline Clavering
- Relatives: George Venables-Vernon, 5th Baron Vernon (grandson)
- Military career
- Allegiance: Great Britain; United Kingdom
- Branch: Royal Navy
- Service years: 1771–1822
- Rank: Admiral of the White
- Commands: HMS Helena; HMS Ariadne; HMS Winchester; HMS Flora; Western Squadron; HMS Pomone; HMS Canada; North America Station
- Conflicts: American War of Independence; French Revolutionary Wars; Action of 23 April 1794; Invasion of France (1795); Battle of Tory Island; Napoleonic Wars; Action of 13 March 1806; War of 1812

Admiral of the White Sir John Borlase Warren, 1st Baronet (2 September 1753 – 27 February 1822) was a Royal Navy officer, diplomat and politician who sat in the British House of Commons between 1774 and 1807.

== Early life ==
Born in Stapleford, Nottinghamshire, he was the son and heir of John Borlase Warren (died 1763) of Stapleford and Little Marlow. He entered Emmanuel College, Cambridge in 1769, but in 1771 entered the Royal Navy as an able seaman; in 1774 he became member of Parliament for Great Marlow; and in 1775 he was created a baronet, the baronetcy held by his ancestors, the Borlases, having become extinct in 1689.

== Career ==
His career as a seaman really began in 1777, and two years later he was promoted to master and commander and made captain of HMS Ariadne. Warren was promoted to post-captain on 25 April 1781. On 23 April 1794, as Commodore of the frigate squadron off the north-west French coast assisting in the blockade of Brest, Warren and his squadron captured a number of French frigates. In 1795, he commanded one of the two squadrons carrying troops for the Quiberon expedition and in 1796 his frigate squadron off Brest is said to have captured or destroyed 220 vessels. In October 1798, a French fleet—carrying 5,000 men—sailed from Brest intending to invade Ireland. The plan was frustrated in no small part due to the squadron under his command during the action of 12 October 1798 off Donegal. Warre was promoted to Rear-Admiral of the Blue on 14 February 1799 and again to Rear-Admiral of the White on 1 January 1801.

=== Diplomatic career ===
In 1802, Warren became a member of the Privy Council and sent to St. Petersburg as ambassador extraordinary, though he continued his career in the British navy, being promoted to Rear-Admiral of the Red on 23 April 1804. On 9 November 1805 Warren was promoted to Vice-Admiral of the Blue and in the action of 13 March 1806 he captured the French ship of the line Marengo. Warren served as commander-in-chief of the North American Station from 1807 to 1810, during which he was promoted to Vice-Admiral of the White on 28 April 1808.

He was promoted to Admiral of the Blue on 31 July 1810 and again served as commander-in-chief of the North American Station from 1812 to 1813. On 4 June 1814 Warren was promoted again to Admiral of the White. While in Halifax he determined the late commander John Shortland's dog had been stolen from London and brought to Halifax. He had the dog returned to London to Shortland's widow. During the War of 1812, Warren held ultimate command over the British forces which carried out the raid on Havre de Grace on 3 May 1813, though he did not physically participate in the raid.

== Personal life ==
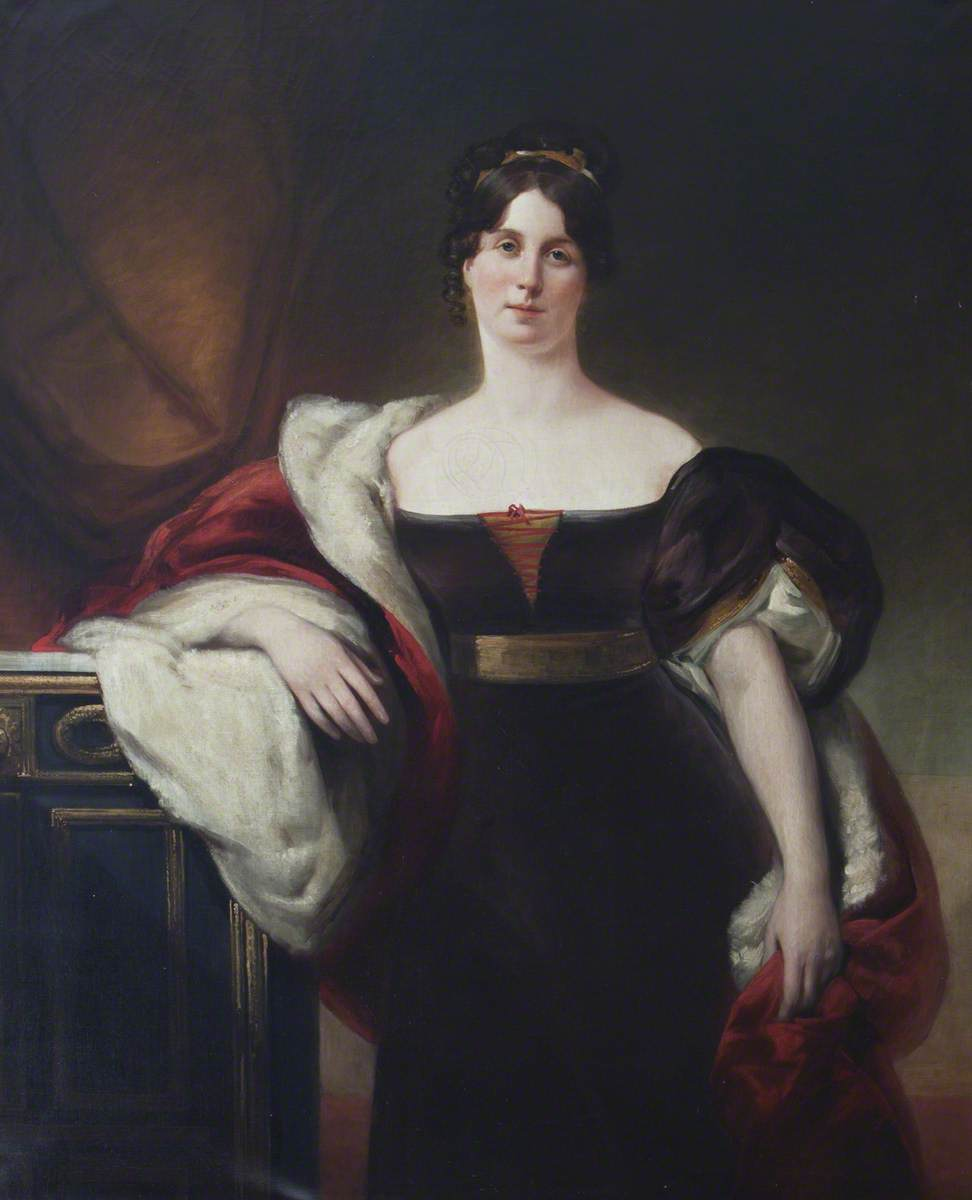
Portrait of his daughter, Frances Maria Warren, between c. 1820 and c. 1830

On 12 December 1780, he married Caroline Clavering, a daughter of Lt.-Gen. Sir John Clavering. She died in 1839.

He died on 27 February 1822. His two sons predeceased him. His daughter and heiress, Frances Maria Warren (1784–1837), married George Venables-Vernon, 4th Baron Vernon. Their son was George Venables-Vernon, 5th Baron Vernon.

=== Legacy ===
There is a monument to him in St Mary's Church, Attenborough in Nottinghamshire. A popular figure in the area of his birth, there are a number of pubs named after him in Nottingham and nearby towns.

== Notes ==
Parliament of Great Britain
| Preceded by William Clayton; William Dickinson | Member of Parliament for Great Marlow; 1774–1784; With: William Clayton 1774–83; William Clayton 1783–84 | Succeeded by William Clayton; Sir Thomas Rich |
| Preceded by Robert Smith; Daniel Parker Coke | Member of Parliament for Nottingham; 1797–1800; With: Daniel Parker Coke | Succeeded by Parliament of the United Kingdom |
Parliament of the United Kingdom
| Preceded by Parliament of Great Britain | Member of Parliament for Nottingham; 1801–1806; With: Daniel Parker Coke 1801–02, 1803–06; Joseph Birch 1802–03 | Succeeded by Daniel Coke; John Smith |
| Preceded by Thomas Grenville; Sir William Young, Bt | Member of Parliament for Buckingham; 1807; With: Thomas Grenville | Succeeded by Thomas Grenville; Richard Neville |
Military offices
| Preceded by George Cranfield Berkeley | Commander-in-Chief, North American Station; 1807–1810 | Succeeded by Herbert Sawyer |
| Preceded by Herbert Sawyer | Commander-in-Chief, North American Station; 1813–1814 | Succeeded by Sir Alexander Cochrane |
Baronetage of Great Britain
| New creation | Baronet (of Little Marlow); 1775–1822 | Extinct |
| Preceded by Pepperell baronets | Warren baronets of Little Marlow; 1 June 1775 | Succeeded by Boyd baronets |
