= Pellew =

Pellew may refer to:

== People ==
=== As a given name ===
- Pellew Hawker, pen name of Cora Minnett (1868–later than 1918), Australian author and confidence trickster

=== As a surname ===
- Caroline Pellew (1882–1963), geneticist
- Charles Pellew, 7th Viscount Exmouth (1863-1945), chemistry professor and British peer
- Claughton Pellew, English painter
- Edward Pellew, 1st Viscount Exmouth (1757–1833), British naval officer and admiral
- Edward Pellew, 3rd Viscount Exmouth (1811–1876), British peer
- Edward Pellew, 4th Viscount Exmouth (1861–1899), British army officer and landowner
- Edward Pellew, 5th Viscount Exmouth (1890-1922), British army officer and landowner
- Fleetwood Pellew (1789–1861), British naval officer and admiral
- Henry Pellew, 6th Viscount Exmouth (1828–1923), philanthropist and British peer
- Israel Pellew (1758–1832), British naval officer and admiral
- Mark Pellew (born 1942), British diplomat
- Nip Pellew (1893–1981), Australian cricketer
- Pownoll Pellew, 2nd Viscount Exmouth (1786–1833), British naval officer and MP

=== As a middle name ===
- Edward Quinan (1885–1960), full name Edward Pellew Quinan, British army officer
- Edward and Fleetwood Pellew Wilson, founders of the shipping line Wilson, Sons
- Edward Pellew Wilson, Jr. (1832–1899), British businessman
- Godfrey Edward Pellew Arkwright (1864–1944), British musicologist
- Henry Pering Pellew Crease (1823–1905), British lawyer, judge, and politician

== Other uses ==
- Sir Edward Pellew Group of Islands, off Australia, named for Edward Pellew, 1st Viscount Exmouth
- HMS Pellew, several ships of the Royal Navy
