= Canonteign =

Structure in South Devon, England

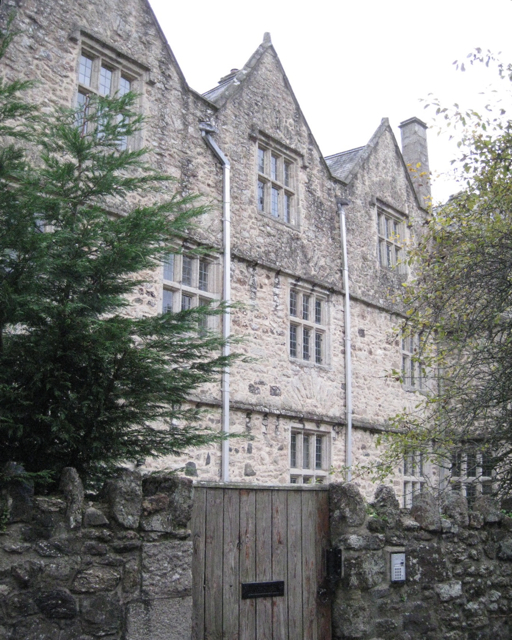
Canonteign Manor House, a Grade I listed 16th-century building. View of the rear of the central bays

Canonteign (originally "Canons' Teign") is an historic tything in the parish of Christow, near Chudleigh, in South Devon, England and situated in the valley of the River Teign. The 'canon' in the name refers to the Augustinian canons regular, either of St Mary du Val in Normandy or of Merton Priory, which owned it for several centuries. It is best known today for the Canonteign Falls waterfall. Canonteign contains three significant houses: the original Grade I listed 16th-century manor house ("Canonteign Manor House"), the ancient barton house (home farm) ("Canonteign Barton") situated nearby behind a granite wall, and a new mansion house built by the Pellew family in the early 19th century nearby ("Canonteign House"), to which that family moved their residence thereby abandoning the old manor house.

== Nomenclature ==
Its name serves to distinguish it from several other ancient manors or estates situated in the valley of the River Teign such as Teigncombe, Drewsteignton (held by the Drewe family), Teigngrace (held by the Grace family), Kingsteignton (a royal manor), Bishopsteignton (held by the Bishop of Exeter) and Teignharvey.

== Descent ==
=== Montbray ===
In the Domesday Book of 1086 'Teigne' is listed as the 97th of the 99 manors or other landholdings held by Geoffrey de Montbray (died 1093), Bishop of Coutances, and was occupied by his tenant Geoffrey de Trelly, lord of the manor of Trelly in Normandy, today in the département of Manche, France. Teign passed to the Feudal barony of Gloucester.

=== de la Pomeroy ===
It later came into the possession of the de la Pomeroy family, feudal barons of Berry Pomeroy in Devon.

=== St Mary du Val, Bayeux ===
In about 1125 it was granted by Jocelyn de la Pomeray to the Canons of the Augustinian Abbey of St Mary du Val, Bayeux, Normandy, as is evidenced by the following charter of the Augustinian Abbey of St Mary du Val, Bayeux, published in 1899 by J. Horace Round in his Calendar of Documents Preserved in France: 918-1206

(No.1455) Charter of Goslin de Pomeria, giving, with consent of Emma his wife, and Henry, Roger, Philip, Goslin, and Ralph his sons, by the hand of Richard (1107–1133) Bishop of Bayeux, to the church of St. Mary du Val (que dicitur “Valle”) to the canons there serving God, according to the rule of St. Augustine, in cloistered community, with all that follows: 60 acres in the parish of St. Omer, etc. … and half his swine and those of his heirs, when killed (occisionem porcorum) in Normandy, and the tithe of his mares in Normandy and England and 40 shillings sterling (de Esterlins) from the rents (gablo) of Berry-Pomeroy (Bercium) every year on August 1, and the church and tithe of Berry, etc. and in England (sic) the tithe of his swine and of his mills of Berry etc. … and in England a manor called (Canon) Teign (Tigneam), and his chaplainry in England, namely, the tithe of wool, and cheese, and porkers, and lambs at Ottery (Otrevum), and all belonging to his chaplainry (capellarie) in England etc. … (Other gifts in Normandy by William son of Payn and Richard his son, a canon of the abbey, by Roger Capra, with consent of his wife Petronilla and son William, etc.) Testibus istis: ("with these witnesses:") Goslino de Pomeria cum filiis suis, Henrico, Rogerio, Philippo, Goslino; et Willelmo filio Pagani, cum filiis suis; et Hugone de Rosello, et Christino de Olleyo; Willelmo filio Ricardi; Waltero de Petra ficta; Willelmo de Rosello; Willelmo de Braio; Goslino de Braio; Roberto Buzone; Roberto de Curcell(is).

=== Merton Priory ===
In 1267, Merton Priory swapped various lands in Normandy for St Mary du Val's lands in Devon and Cornwall, including Tregony, Buckerell and Canonteign. In 1298-9, the priory was in litigation with Henry Pomeroy over this and other lands, but they settled their disputes and Merton retained its Devon lands.

=== Post-Dissolution ===
After the Dissolution of the Monasteries Canonteign was granted by the crown to John Russell, 1st Earl of Bedford (c.1485-1554/5), Lord Lieutenant of Devon, amongst the huge grants he received in Devon (most notably Tavistock Abbey) and elsewhere from King Henry VIII.

=== Berry ===
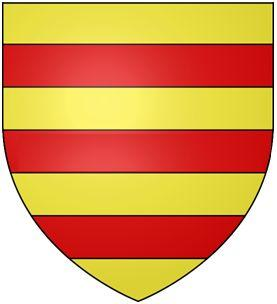
Arms of Berry, lords of the manor of Berry Narbor, Devon: Or, three bars gules

Russell sold it to John Berry (alias Bury), who having been engaged in the Prayer Book Rebellion of 1549, was taken prisoner, carried to London, and executed for treason. John Berry's role in the Rebellion is described as follows in a contemporary tract:

"The chief captain of all, saving one, was the Marquis of Exeter's man, and setteth forth the matter of the Cardinal so much, as indeed he maketh no other matter. His name is Berry, one of them which subscribed the Articles."

The Western Rebellion (1913) states:

"A thorough search through the detailed lists of the Marquis's servants does not disclose this name. According to his own account at the time of the first disturbance in Exeter, in June, 1549, he was servant, i.e. wore the livery of, Sir Thomas Denys, [of Holcombe Burnell] and he lived at Silverton. He had estates at Hartland, Ugborough, Tavistock, Plympton, Widecombe-in-the-Moor, and elsewhere. He was the son of Lewis Bury or Berry by his wife Margaret, who afterwards married Thomas Darke. The latter had the guardianship of John for four years, and then gave it to John Ashe of Sowton, who married Bury to his daughter". A footnote adds: "He was probably of the Berrynarbor family and his wife's name may have been Cove; through her John inherited the estates of John Kyrton, in Blisland, where he usually lived. His second wife was Katherine, daughter of Lawrence Courtenay, of Ethy. He survived the Rebellion, dying the 28th April, 1569, leaving two sons, Robert and John, by his first wife".

The estate was then granted to William Gibbs, having presumably escheated to the crown.

=== Gibbon ===
In the 17th century Canonteign was owned by the Gibbon family, and a monument survives in Christow Church to Elizabeth Gibbon (died 1660) and Thomas Gibbon (no date). An heiress of the Gibbon family is supposed to have brought it to the Davie family.

=== Davie ===
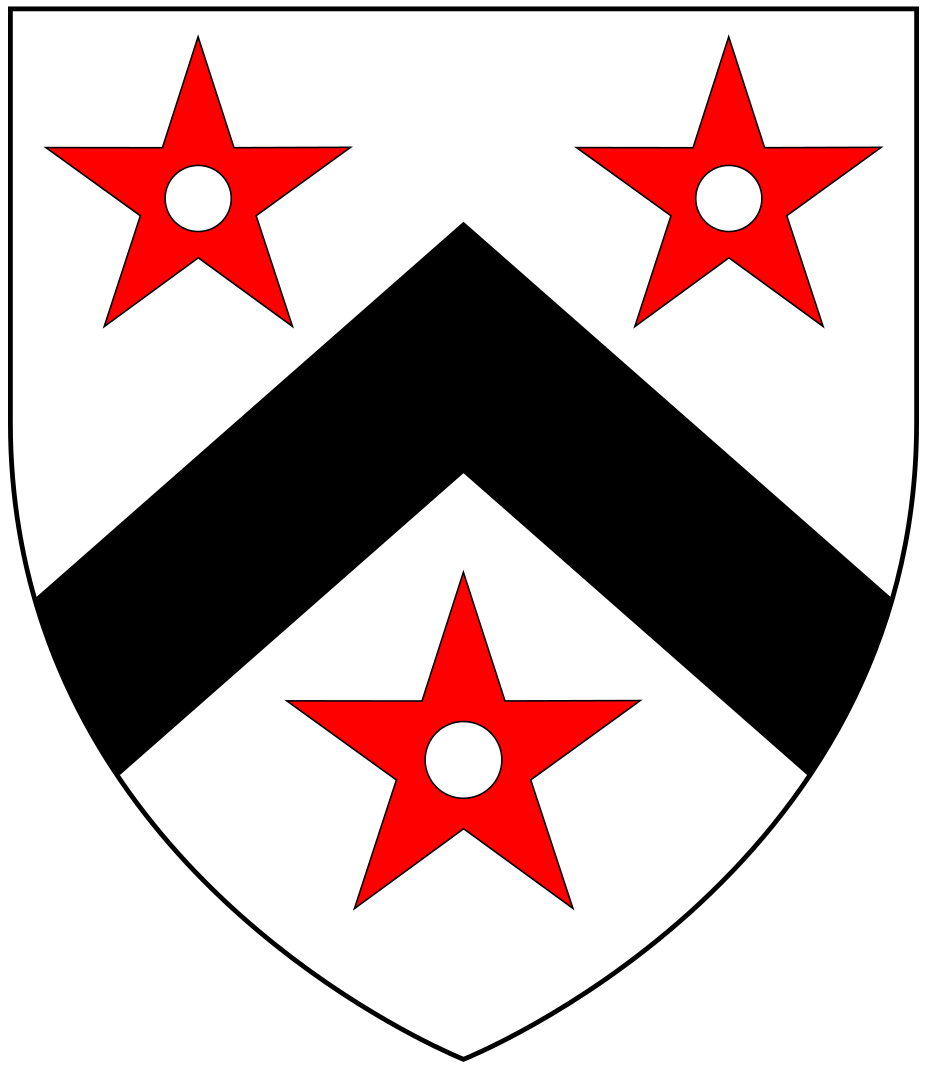
de la Way or de Via arms: Argent, a chevron sable between three mullets pierced gules

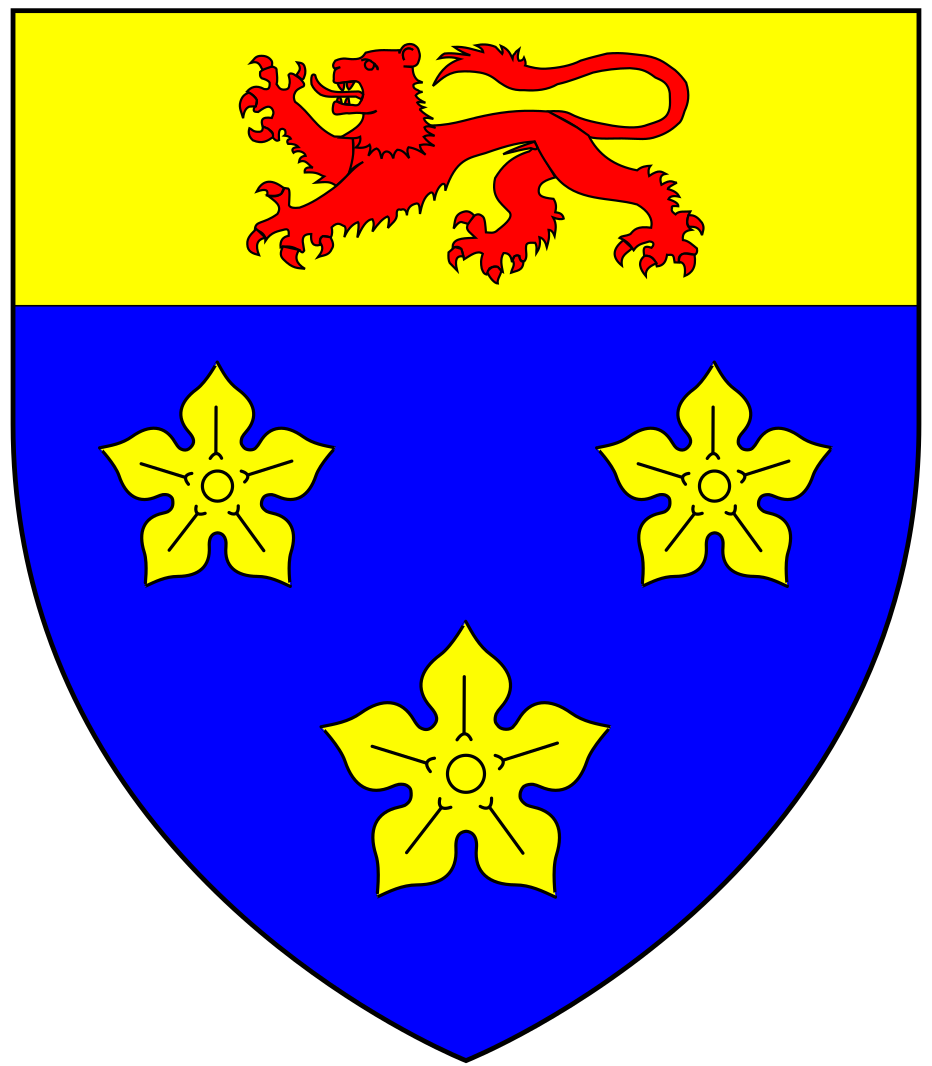
Bardolph arms Davie of Creedy: Azure, three cinquefoils or on a chief of the last a lion passant gules These arms were used by John Davie (died 1611/12) and by his son the 1st Baronet

==== Gilbert Davie (16th c.) ====
The first member of the Davie family to have lived at the estate of Canonteign appears to have been Gilbert Davie (fl.16th c.), the second son of Robert Davie (d. circa 1570), a wealthy cloth merchant from Crediton, Devon. At sometime between 1559 and 1578 Gilbert Davie (or possibly his father) acquired the manor of Combe Lancey, near Ruxford and Creedy, which remained a possession of the Davies of Canonteign until the deaths in 1637 of Gilbert’s great-grand-daughter Anne Davie (the widow Parker, and wife of John Trelawny) and her heir and uncle John Davie of Christow, at which time it passed to a their cousin Sir John Davie, 1st Baronet of Creedy.

Gilbert Davie married Mary Gere (alias Geer), daughter of John Gere of Hevitree near Exeter. By his wife he had 2 sons:

- Robert Davie (1564-pre-1617), eldest son and heir
- Emanuel Davie, 2nd son, living in 1617, whose daughter Anne Davie married Lewis Dowrich.

==== Robert Davie (1564-pre-1617) ====
Robert Davie (1564-pre-1617), eldest son and heir, baptised at Crediton in 1564. His seal survives on a lease granted by him of Combe Lancey dated 8 April 1614 (Devon Record Office Z1/10/202, Shelley Archive), which shows the Davie "Bardolph" arms supposedly granted in 1594 to his uncle John Davie of Exeter and Creedy. He married Anne Northcote (1564–1637), a daughter of John Northcote (died 1587) of Crediton by his wife Elizabeth Dowrish (died 1587) of Dowrish, near Crediton. Anne's brother was John Northcote (1570–1632), of Hayne, Newton St Cyres, near Crediton (whose splendid monument with standing effigy exists in Newton St Cyres Church) who married Susan Pollard, a daughter of Sir Hugh Pollard, lord of the manor of King's Nympton, and was the father of Sir John Northcote, 1st Baronet (1599–1676), ancestor of the Northcote Earls of Iddesleigh.

==== Gilbert Davie (1583–1627) ====
Gilbert Davie (1583–1627), eldest son and heir, who in 1616 married Gertrude Pollard, a daughter of Sir Hugh Pollard, lord of the manor of King's Nympton, and a sister of Sir Lewis Pollard, 1st Baronet. He left a daughter and sole heiress Anne Davie (1617–1637), who married a member of the Trelawny family but died without issue, when her heir to Canonteign became her uncle John Davie of Christow.

==== John Davie of Christow ====
John Davie of Christow (uncle), second son of Robert Davie (1564-pre-1617).

==== Robert Davie (fl.1633) ====
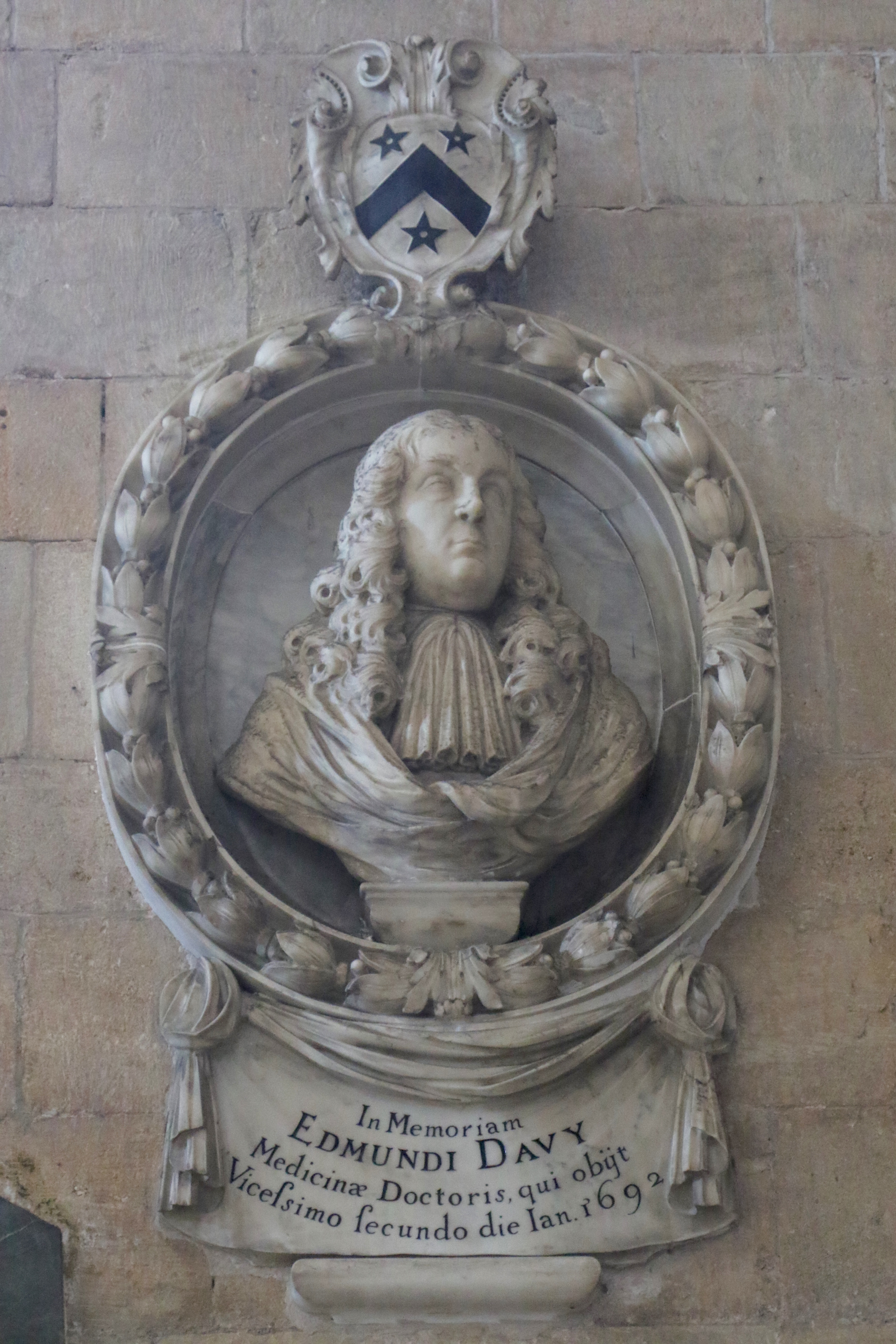
Mural monument to Dr Edmund Davie (1630–1692) in Exeter Cathedral

Robert Davie (fl.1633), younger brother, third son of Robert Davie (1564-pre-1617). He married a certain Rachell (fl.1633), and the couple emigrated to New England. He had two sons:

- William Davie, eldest son and heir, of Canonteign, see below.
- Dr Edmund Davie (1630–1692), 2nd son, a Doctor of Physick, who lived at the Chantry in Exeter, one of the Worthies of Devon of John Prince (1643–1723), of whom he was an acquaintance. Prince described him as "The great Aesculapius of his time in these western parts". According to Lysons Magna Britannia (1822) he was the last in the male line of the Davie family of Canonteign. His mural monument survives in the south aisle of the Lady Chapel of Exeter Cathedral and displays his sculpted bust, inscribed in Latin as follows: In memoriam Edmundi Davy, Medicinae Doctoris, qui obiit vicessimo secundo die Jan(uarii) 1692 ("In memory of Edmund Davy, Doctor of Medicine, who died on the twenty second day of January 1692"). Above are shown the arms of Davie Argent, a chevron sable between three mullets pierced gules, but with mullets shown sable.

==== William Davie ====
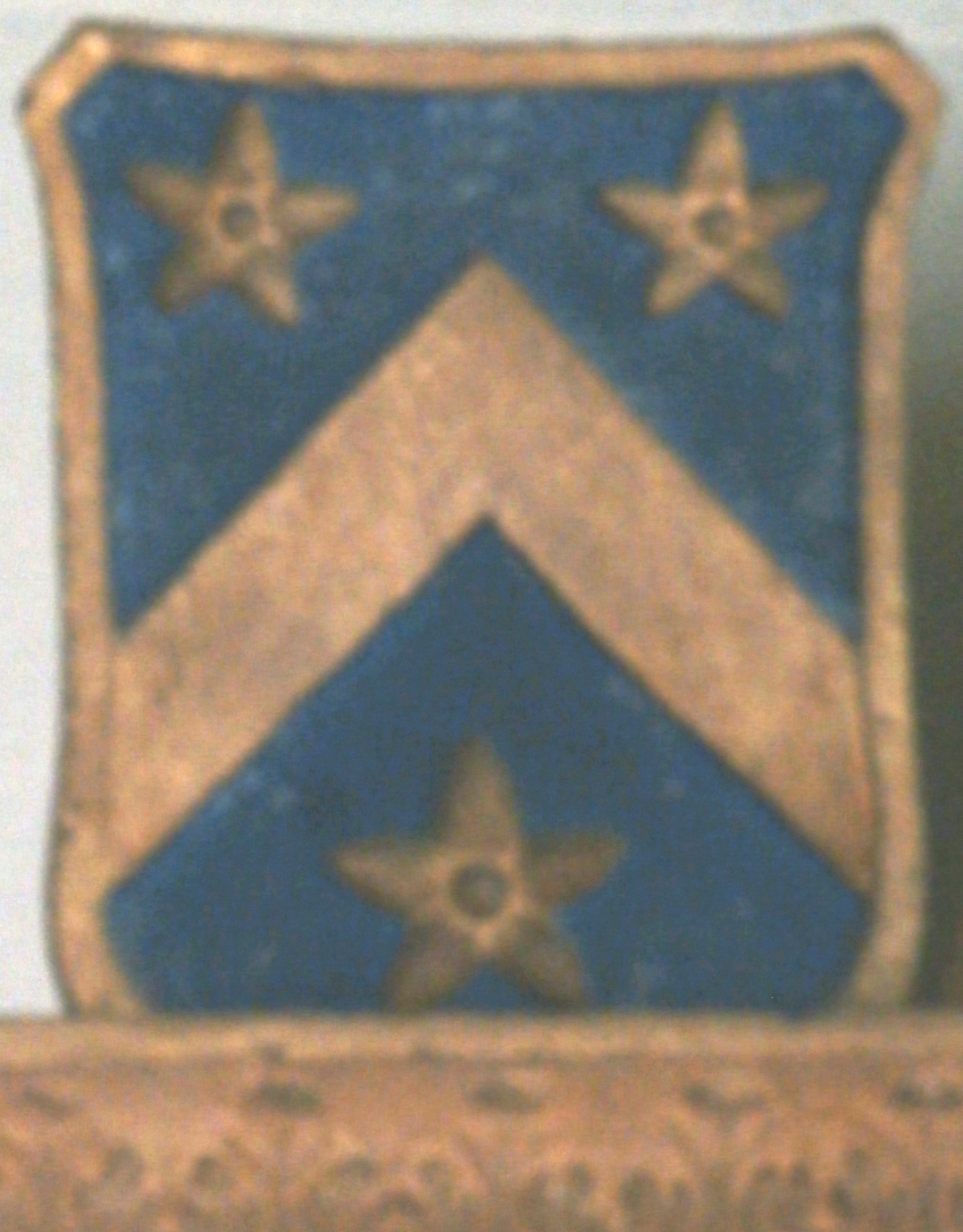
Arms of Davie of Canonteign: Azure, a chevron between three mullets pierced or (a difference of Davie of Creedy, Sandford). Dexter top of mural monument in All Saints Church, Clovelly, Devon, to Dr. George Cary (1611–1680), lord of the manor of Clovelly, and representing his daughter-in-law Martha Davie, daughter and heiress of William Davie of Canonteign, and second wife of his eldest son and heir, Sir George Cary (1654–1685) of Clovelly, who erected the monument

William Davie, eldest son and heir, a Counsellor at Law and a Justice of the Peace for Devon, whose daughter and sole heiress was Martha Davie who married Sir George Cary (1654–1685) lord of the manor of Clovelly, but who left no children. The de Via arms of Davie of Canonteign are shown on the mural monument in All Saints Church, Clovelly, to Dr. George Cary (1611–1680), lord of the manor of Clovelly, representing his daughter-in-law Martha Davie.

=== Helyar ===
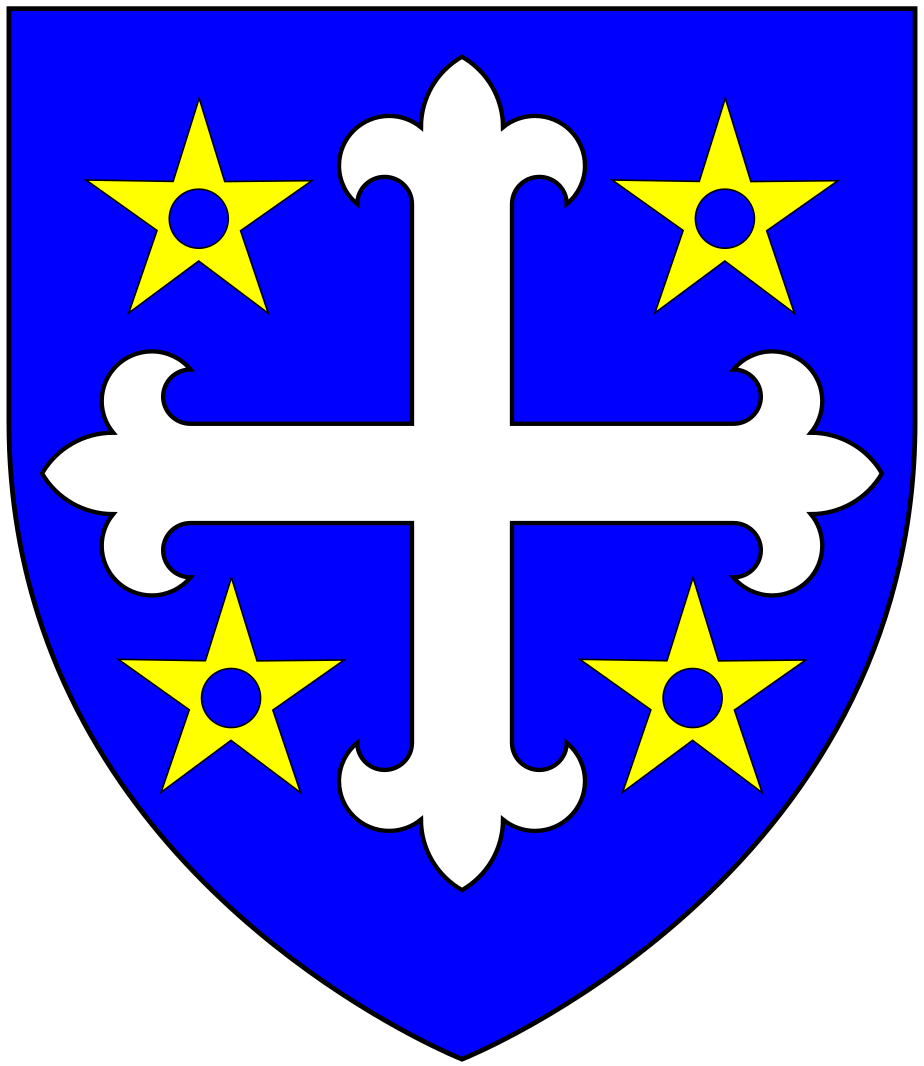
Arms of Helyar: Azure, a cross flory argent between four mullets pierced or

Due to the foreclosure of a mortgage, Canonteign passed to the Helyar family, which lived for some time there. The Helyar family of Canonteign traces its ancestry back to Rev. William Helyar (1559–1645) Doctor of Divinity, Archdeacon of Barnstaple, Devon, and a chaplain to Queen Elizabeth I, who purchased the manor of Coker and obtained a grant of arms from the herald William Camden in 1607: Azure, a cross flory argent between four mullets pierced or. An earlier member of this family was Richard Helyar (died 1446), Archdeacon of Cornwall in 1442 and Archdeacon of Barnstaple in 1445, who was buried in the North Choir aisle of Exeter Cathedral.

==== William Helyar (1662–1742) ====
William Helyar (1662–1742) of Coker Court in East Coker, Somerset, and of Canonteign, and owner of a plantation in Jamaica, was Sheriff of Somerset in 1701 and Member of Parliament for Ilchester, Somerset, 1688–90 and for Somerset 1714-22. He was the son and heir of Colonel William Helyar (1621/2-1697) of Coker, Sheriff of Somerset in 1661, who as a Royalist during the Civil War had raised a troop of horse for King Charles I and was a colonel in the king's army. In 1643 he had surrendered to Fairfax and was in the City of Exeter at its surrender in 1646. His estates were sequestered and he compounded for £1,522. Col. Helyar married Rachel Wyndham (died 1678), a daughter and co-heiress of Sir Hugh Wyndham, 1st Baronet (died 1663) of Pilsden Court, Dorset.

In 1690 William Helyar (1662–1742) married Joanna Hole (died 1714), a daughter and co-heiress of Robert Hole of Blackhall in the parish of South Tawton, Devon.

==== William Helyar (1720–1783) ====
William Helyar (1720–1783) (grandson), of Coker Court in East Coker, Somerset, and of Canonteign and of Blackhall, Devon. He was Sheriff of Somerset in 1764. He was the only son of William Helyar (1693–1723) (eldest son and heir apparent of William Helyar (1662–1742), whom he predeceased) by his wife Mary Goddard, daughter of John Goddard of Gillingham, Dorset. In 1743 he married Betty Weston (died 1786), a daughter and co-heiress of William Weston of Callew Weston in Dorset.

==== William Helyar (1745–1820) ====
William Helyar (1745–1820), eldest son and heir, of Coker Court and Sedghill, Wiltshire, Justice of the Peace. In 1777 he married Elizabeth Hawker (died 1834), second daughter and co-heiress of William Hawker of Luppitt, Devon, by his wife Elizabeth Welman, daughter and heiress of Thomas Welman of Poundisford Lodge, Somerset, youngest son of Isaac Welman of Poundisford Park, Pitminster, near Taunton, Somerset. In 1812 he sold the manors of Canonteign and Christow to Sir Edward Pellew, 1st Baronet, later Viscount Exmouth "of Canonteign". The Helyar family continued to reside at Poundisford Lodge until after 1937.

=== Pellew ===
- Edward Pellew, 1st Viscount Exmouth (1757–1833). "Viscount Exmouth of Canonteign in the County of Devon", was the title granted in 1816 to the prominent naval officer Edward Pellew, 1st Baron Exmouth, who had already been created a baronet in 1796.
- Pownoll Bastard Pellew, 2nd Viscount Exmouth (1786–1833), who in 1828, when "Captain Pellew" and five years before his father's death, built (to the design of C.R. Ayers of London) a new stucco-fronted neo-classical mansion a few hundred yards to the south-west of the old manor house, called "Canonteign House". The old manor house was then converted and subdivided into a farmhouse and suffered thereafter a "gentle decline".
- Edward Pellew, 3rd Viscount Exmouth (1811–1876)
- Edward Fleetwood John Pellew, 4th Viscount Exmouth (1861–1899)
- Edward Addington Hargreaves Pellew, 5th Viscount Exmouth (1890–1922)
- Henry Edward Pellew, 6th Viscount Exmouth (1828–1923)
- Charles Ernest Pellew, 7th Viscount Exmouth (1863–1945)
- Edward Irving Pownoll Pellew, 8th Viscount Exmouth (1868–1951)
- Pownoll Irving Edward Pellew, 9th Viscount Exmouth (1908–1970). Between 1972 and 1975, the old manor house, until then suffering from "gentle decline", underwent a "radical restoration" by Lady Exmouth, his Spanish-born widow, née Maria Luisa, Marquesa de Olias, daughter of Luis de Urquijo, Marques de Amurrio.
- Paul Edward Pellew, 10th Viscount Exmouth (born 1940), who married firstly a Spanish wife and lives in Mallorca, Spain. One of his sisters is Hon. Mary Pellew (born 1947), High Sheriff of Devon in 2010/11, the wife of Robin d'Erlanger of Hensleigh, near Tiverton, Devon.

== 21st century ==
The old manor house was restored in the 1970s and in November 2015 the Grade I listed 16th century "Canonteign Manor House" with 10 acres (4 ha) of garden and parkland was sold to Chinese investor Liqun Peng for £2 million by estate agents Savills, Exeter branch. In 2015, the manor had been listed as featuring four reception rooms, a long gallery (serving as a gym), 7 bedroom suites, a 2nd floor office & staff flat and a sunken walled garden with swimming pool.

News reports in January 2020 indicated that the owner had attempted in 2019 to obtain consent from the Dartmoor National Park Authority to turn the property into a holiday let for up to 17 guests on a short term basis for no more than 90 days per year. Residents in the area objected to the plan. The application was denied and was modified by the property owner. The revised application was tentatively approved on 16 June 2020 on the basis that the property would not be used as a holiday let until the outdoor swimming pool was "decommissioned and fenced from the application site".

A Country Life (magazine) article on 20 June 2020 indicated that the property was on the market through estate agents Fine & Country South Devon with a guide price of £3.5 million; the "heated swimming pool" was stated as one of the amenities. Other sources indicated that the manor had received "extensive and sympathetic renovation". It was listed as a 10-bedroom home over three floors, with a great hall, library, a huge gym and a self-contained flat.
