= Edward Pellew (disambiguation) =

Edward Pellew, 1st Viscount Exmouth (1757–1833) was a British naval officer.

Edward Pellew may also refer to:

- Edward Pellew, 3rd Viscount Exmouth (1811–1876), British peer
- Edward Pellew, 4th Viscount Exmouth (1861–1899), British peer
- Edward Pellew, 5th Viscount Exmouth (1890–1922), British peer

== See also ==
- Edward Pellew Wilson Jr. (1832–1899), British-Brazilian businessman
