= William Jay (jurist) =

United States jurist, abolitionist and peace activist

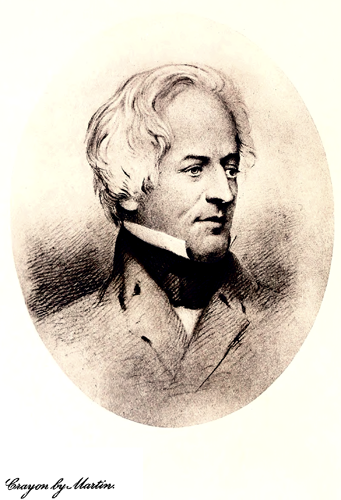
- Born: June 16, 1789; New York City, U.S.
- Died: 14 October 1858 (aged 69); Bedford, New York, U.S.
- Education: Yale College
- Occupation: Judge
- Spouse: Augusta McVickar (m. 1812; died 1857)
- Children: 8, including John
- Parent(s): John Jay; Sarah Livingston Jay
- Relatives: William Livingston (grandfather); Charles Pellew, 7th Viscount Exmouth (grandson)

Signature
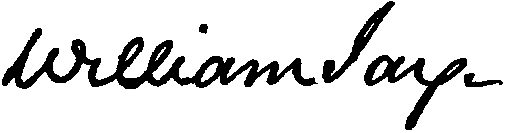

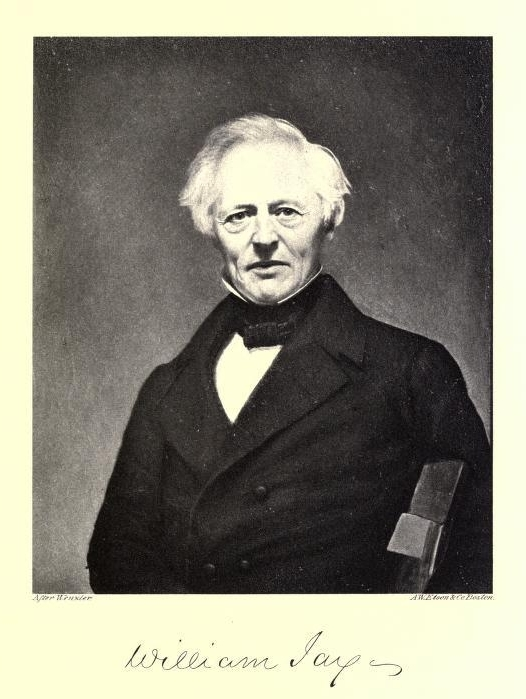
Portrait of William Jay by Anthon Henry Wenzler

William Jay (June 16, 1789 – October 14, 1858) was an American abolitionist and jurist, son of Governor of New York and first Chief Justice of the United States John Jay.

== Early life and education ==
Jay was born in New York City on June 16, 1789, in between his father's terms as United States Secretary of Foreign Affairs in the Washington administration. He was the son of John Jay (1745–1829) and Sarah Van Brugh (née Livingston) Jay (1756–1802). Among his older siblings was Peter Augustus (who served as Recorder of New York City under Richard Riker), Susan, Maria, and Ann Jay.

His maternal grandparents were Susannah (née French) Livingston and William Livingston, an attorney who was a signer of the United States Constitution and later served as the first post-colonial Governor of New Jersey during the American Revolutionary War. His paternal grandparents were Peter Jay, a wealthy trader in furs, wheat, timber, and other commodities, and Mary (née Van Cortlandt) Jay (daughter of New York mayor Jacobus Van Cortlandt).

He graduated from Yale College in 1808.

== Career ==
After his graduation, he took up the management of his father's large estate in Westchester County, New York, and also studied law in Albany. Poor eyesight soon compelled him to give up the legal profession. He early became interested in various philanthropic enterprises and reforms and identified himself especially with the temperance, antislavery, and antiwar movements. He was one of the founders (in 1816) of the American Bible Society, which he defended against the vigorous attacks of the High Church party, led by Bishop John H. Hobart. He was Judge of Common Pleas in New York from 1818 to 1820, and was first judge of Westchester County from 1820 to 1842, when he was removed on account of his anti-slavery views.

A member of the American Anti-Slavery Society, whose constitution he drafted, Jay stood with James Birney at the head of the conservative abolitionists, and by his calm, logical, and judicial writings exerted for many years a powerful influence.

From 1835 to 1837, he was the society's corresponding foreign secretary. In 1840, however, when the society began to advocate measures which he deemed too radical, he withdrew his membership, but with his pen he continued his labor on behalf of the slave, urging emancipation in the District of Columbia and the exclusion of slavery from the territories, though deprecating any attempt to interfere with slavery in the states. He vociferously attacked the U.S. federal government for what he perceived to be favoritism toward slavery interests, writing in 1844:

RECAPITULATION OF THE ACTION OF THE FEDERAL GOVERNMENT IN BEHALF OF SLAVERY.

This action we have found exhibited (omitting constitutional provisions) in

1. Its effort to degrade the free people of color by excluding them from the militia; prohibiting them from driving a mail waggon—denying naturalization to foreigners of their complexion—subjecting them to odious disqualifications and restrictions in the City of Washington; and above all in permitting them without trial, at the discretion of the marshal, to be sold as slaves to pay their JAIL FEES.
2. In its tolerance of slavery in territories under its exclusive jurisdiction.
3. In its arbitrary, unconstitutional, and wicked laws for the arrest of fugitive slaves.
4. In its negotiation with Great Britain and Mexico for the surrender of fugitive slaves.
5. In its invasion of Florida, in pursuit of fugitive slaves.
6. In its negotiations with Great Britain, for compensation for slaves who had taken refuge on board British ships of war.
7. In its negotiation with Great Britain, for compensation for slaves, ship-wrecked in the West Indies.
8. In its tolerance, protection, and regulation of the American slave trade.
9. In its duplicity, with regard to the abolition of the African slave trade.
10. In its efforts to prevent the abolition of slavery in Cuba.
11. In its conduct towards Hayti.
12. In its conduct towards Texas.
13. In its attempt to establish a censorship of the press.
14. In its invasion of the right of petition, and the freedom of debate.

Such has been the action in behalf of human bondage, of a Government which, in the language of the Constitution, was formed to establish JUSTICE, and secure the blessings of LIBERTY.

He was also a proponent of antiwar theories and was for many years president of the Peace Society. His pamphlet War and Peace: the Evils of the First with a Plan for Securing the Last, advocating international arbitration, was published by the English Peace Society in 1842, and is said to have contributed to the promulgation, by the powers signing the Treaty of Paris in 1856, of a protocol expressing the wish that nations, before resorting to arms, should have recourse to the good offices of a friendly power.

== Personal life ==
In 1812, Jay was married to Augusta McVickar (1790–1857), the daughter of John McVickar, Esq. of New York. Together, William and Augusta were the parents of eight children, all but two who survived to adulthood. Their children included:

- Augusta Jay, who married John Nelson.
- Maria Banyer Jay (1802–1851), who married John F. Butterworth.
- John Jay (1817–1894), who served as U.S. Minister to Austria-Hungary under President Ulysses S. Grant.
- Sarah Louisa Jay (1819–1905), who married Dr. Alexander M. Bruen.
- Eliza Constable Jay (1823–1869), who married Henry Edward Pellew, later 6th Viscount Exmouth, a son of George Pellew, who was Dean of Norwich (himself the third son of Edward Pellew, 1st Viscount Exmouth).
- Augusta Jay (1833–1917), who married Henry Edward Pellew after Eliza's death.

Jay died at his residence in Bedford, New York on 14 October 1858. Through his daughter Eliza, he was a grandfather of Charles Pellew, 7th Viscount Exmouth, a former professor of chemistry at Columbia University.

== Assessment ==
According to Frederick Douglass, Jay "was our wise counsellor, our fine friend, and our liberal benefactor." Lewis Tappan described him as "one of the most talented and useful abolitionists in this country, who, by his pen and active labours, has performed a greater service to the cause than perhaps any other man".

== Publications ==
- Jay, William (1833). The life of John Jay: with selections from his correspondence and miscellaneous papers. New York: J. & J. Harper. ISBN 9780836968583.
- Jay, William (1835). An Inquiry into the Character and Tendency of the American Colonization and American Anti-Slavery Societies. Republished 1838 by the American Anti-Slavery Society. New York: Leavitt, Lord & Co.
- Jay, William (1837). A View of the Action of the Federal Government in Behalf of Slavery. Utica, New York: J. C. Jackson, for the New York Anti-Slavery Society.
- Jay, William (1842). War and Peace: the evils of the first and a plan for preserving the last. Reprinted [1919] from the original edition of 1842, with an introductory note by James Brown Scott, Director of the Division of International Law of the Carnegie Endowment for International Peace. New York: Oxford University Press.
- Jay, William (1849). A Review of the Causes and Consequences of the Mexican War. Boston: Benjamin B. Mussey.
- Jay, William (1850). Reply to remarks of Rev. Moses Stuart, lately a professor in the theological seminary at Andover, on Hon. John Jay, and an examination of his Scriptural exegesis, contained in his recent pamphlet entitled, "Conscience and the Constitution". New York. (On slavery.)
- Jay, William (1853). Letters respecting the American Board of Commissioners for Foreign Missions, and the American Tract Society. New York: Lewis J. Bates. (On their positions on slavery.)
- Jay, William (1853). Miscellaneous Writings on Slavery. Boston: John P. Jewitt & Company.

== Attribution ==
- Jay, John (1892). "Jay, John" . In Wilson, J. G.; Fiske, J. (eds.). Appletons' Cyclopædia of American Biography. New York: D. Appleton. (Follows article on his father John Jay.)
- Rines, George Edwin, ed. (1920). "Jay, William, American jurist" . Encyclopedia Americana.
- (Follows article on his father John Jay.)
