= Susan Pellew =

- Born: Susan Frowde; 1756; East Knoyle, Wiltshire, England
- Died: 29 October 1837 (aged 80–81)
- Title: Viscountess Pellew
- Spouse: Edward Pellew, 1st Viscount Exmouth
- Children: Emma Mary Pellew, Pownoll Bastard Pellew, Julia Pellew, Fleetwood Broughton Reynolds Pellew, George Pellew, Edward William Pellew

Susan, Viscountess Pellew (née Frowde; 1756–1837) was the wife of Edward Pellew, 1st Viscount Exmouth.

Susan Frowde was born in East Knoyle in Wiltshire, the daughter of James Frowde Esq. She met Edward Pellew in 1782. They married on 28 May 1783 when she was reportedly aged eighteen and he was twenty-six. The couple lived in Truro, Cornwall, for a short period after their marriage before moving to New Road in Flushing, close to Falmouth where Susan's brother-in-law, Samuel Pellew, was Collector of Customs.

The Pellews had six children:

- Emma Mary Pellew (18 January 1785 – March 1835)
- Pownoll Bastard Pellew, later 2nd Viscount Exmouth (1 July 1786 – 2 December 1833)
- Julia Pellew (28 November 1787 – 26 December 1831)
- Fleetwood Broughton Reynolds Pellew, later an admiral and knight (13 December 1789 – 28 July 1861)
- George Pellew, Dean of Norwich (3 April 1793 – 13 October 1866)
- Edward William Pellew, later a minister (3 November 1799 – 29 August 1869)

After Pellew was knighted for defeating the French frigate Cléopâtre in the action of 18 June 1793, King George III awarded Susan a £150 annuity from the Privy Purse to cover additional household expenses associated with her husband's new title. She later became Lady Exmouth, when Pellew was made Baron Exmouth of Canonteign in 1814.

In 1797, as her husband's fame increased following the action of 13 January 1797, when Pellew's frigate HMS Indefatigable and her consort HMS Amazon defeated the French 74-gun ship Droits de l'Homme, she and the family moved from their terraced house in Flushing to the rented Trefusis Manor.

Susan was a devoted wife who supported her husband's naval career, managed their estate and raised their family during his absences at sea; however, she vehemently opposed his political ambitions and when he was appointed MP for Barnstaple in 1802 she refused to accompany him to London.

When Pellew was appointed Commander-in-Chief of the East Indies Station in 1805, Susan chose to remain in England with her family. Though the couple were apart for five years, they maintained a regular correspondence. While Pellew was serving in the East Indies, Susan took in a young woman in reduced circumstances, Jane Smith, who came to regard Susan and Pellew as her adopted parents.

In 1804, she bought the family's first property, Hampton House in Plymouth. She lived there until 1811 when she sold the property to the Reverend Robert Hawker.

In 1812, she purchased two new properties for the family: Canonteign House, where her eldest son, Pownoll, lived with his wife, Eliza, and West Cliffe House (now Bitton House) in Teignmouth where she and her husband resided after his retirement, with various children and grandchildren, until his death in 1833.

Susan disapproved of the posthumous biography of Pellew, commissioned by his brother Samuel and written by Edward Osler, and she burned the majority of her husband's personal correspondence.

Susan Pellew died on 29 October 1837, four years after her husband, and is buried with him at Christow in Devon.
