= Child advocacy =

Individuals, and organizations who advocate for children

Child advocacy refers to a range of individuals, professionals and advocacy organizations who speak out on the best interests of children. An individual or organization engaging in advocacy typically seeks to protect children's rights which may be abridged or abused in a number of areas.

== What child advocates do ==
A child advocate typically represents or gives voice to children whose concerns and interests are not being heard. Child advocacy can be done at the micro level (for one child or a few children), mezzo level (for group of children or at a community level) or macro level (for a category of children affected by a social issue). A child advocate will try to prevent children from being harmed and may try to obtain justice for those who have already been injured in some way. A child advocate may also seek to ensure that children have access to resources or services which will benefit their lives such as education, childcare and proper parenting. Malnutrition is another form of harm-there are many children who go to bed without eating and it is looked over by child welfare or the police.

Another form of child advocacy happens at the policy level and aims at changing the policies of governments or even transnational policies. These advocates do lobbying, policy research, file lawsuits and engage in other types of policy change techniques. Many use Internet based techniques to influence decision makers.

== Where child advocates can be found ==
Several countries have established Children's Ombudsman agencies, at national, sub-national or local levels, as independent public bodies promoting and protecting the rights of children. Other child advocates exist in school, community, and home environments, and work on an individual, group or governmental level(s) to protect and nurture children. In most circumstances, mothers, fathers, family and teachers all advocate on behalf of children, although it is well recognized that we all have the ability and responsibility to advocate on behalf of children. In Wales the Welsh Assembly Government has set up the National Advocacy Meic helpline which allows children to talk directly to advocates. These independent advocates support and represent the concerns of children.

Eight Canadian provinces, including Ontario, have an official child advocate whose job it is to protect the interests and welfare of all the children in the province. Within the criminal justice system, child advocates are concerned with the developmental needs of children and young people, and can play an important role in ensuring due process rights for young people in conflict with the law. They can help provide a voice for children and young people, ensure just and humane conditions of custody, and guard the privacy rights surrounding record provisions. They can also work to ensure that the special legal protections assigned to young people are provided with dignity and fairness.

=== Child advocacy centers ===
Child advocacy centers (CAC) provide a child-friendly, safe and neutral location in which law enforcement and Child Protective Services investigators may conduct and observe forensic interviews with children who are alleged victims of crimes, and where the child and non-offending family members receive support, crisis intervention and referrals for mental health and medical treatment. The Child advocacy center model's main objective is to reduce trauma to child victims by bringing all disciplines together and sharing information more efficiently to minimize duplication. CACs coordinate multidisciplinary teams composed of law enforcement officers, child protective service personnel, prosecutors, advocates, mental health therapists and medical personnel. The multidisciplinary team meets regularly to communicate and collaborate on child maltreatment cases. Cases are reviewed beginning with the victim’s initial outcry through investigation, treatment and prosecution. Communication within the team reduces duplication and mistakes, and keeps victims from falling through the cracks.

A child forensic interview is a process where a child is given the opportunity to make a statement about what happened in a private, safe, supportive environment. The child is questioned in a legally-sound, developmentally appropriate, and trauma-informed manner by a specially trained child interviewer. Members of the multidisciplinary team that have jurisdiction over the case observe the interview as it is taking place. Interviews are recorded, reducing the number of times children need to be interviewed, therefore reducing trauma to the child. Information gathered in the forensic interview is used to help make decisions about protection, prosecution and treatment. Conducting forensic interviews with child crime victims in a child advocacy center is considered best practice.

History of child advocacy centers: In 1985, Congressman Robert E. "Bud" Cramer (AL), who was then a District Attorney, organized an effort to create a better system to help abused children. He was frustrated as a prosecutor, because he was having difficulty prosecuting child abuse cases and getting guilty verdicts or pleas for offenders of crimes against children. He noticed the social service and the criminal justice systems were not working together in an effective manner and this created the common problem of adding to children's emotional distress, and created a segmented, repetitious, and often frightening experience for the child victims. He pulled together law enforcement, criminal justice, child protective service, medical and mental health workers into one coordinated team that would serve child victims of crime in a respectful way. Thirty years ago, this was a revolutionary idea.

Child advocacy centers in the USA are accredited by the National Children's Alliance.

The Child Advocate in the USA is a national not for profit organization with connections to hundreds of other organizations and resources to address sexual abuse but also many other advocacy needs for children and families. Their goals are to serve the needs of children, families and professionals while addressing mental health, medical, educational, legal and legislative issues.

Child advocacy organizations in the USA at the policy level exist at state and national levels and as transnational NGOs. The organizations that they work in vary from smaller organizations at the local level to multinational voluntary organizations concerned about international child rights.

== The United Nations ==
On the international stage, the United Nations has long advocated on behalf of children through UNICEF, whose position on children was formulated and publicly formalized in the Convention on the Rights of the Child. The convention sets out a summary of collective ideals and a covenant of commitments to all children on the planet.

== Philosophy ==
One thing that all child advocates have in common is healthy respect for young children. There is also recognition that in most countries, children are not seen as having full citizenship status which confers certain rights and responsibilities as adults. Child advocates provide assistance to children both in the foster care setting and children who are going through any court system. They provide the necessary counseling to the adults in child/children's lives to ensure a high quality of life for the child. The most important person to the advocate is the child. The philosophy of a child advocate is to guarantee that the caretakers of any child are receiving the proper tools that are necessary for raising that child, guaranteeing a satisfactory life.

== See also ==
- Aviâja Egede Lynge, Greenland's Spokesperson for the Rights of the Child
- Berkshire Industrial Farm
- Children's Ombudsman
- Children's rights
