= C. Pellew =

C. Pellew is a name, and may refer to:

- Caroline Pellew (b. 1882), geneticist
- Charles Pellew, 7th Viscount Exmouth (1863-1945), chemistry professor and British peer

== See also ==
- Cape Pellew, a point in Australia
