= Canonteign Falls =

Waterfall in Devon, England

Coordinates: 50.6296°N 3.6515°W

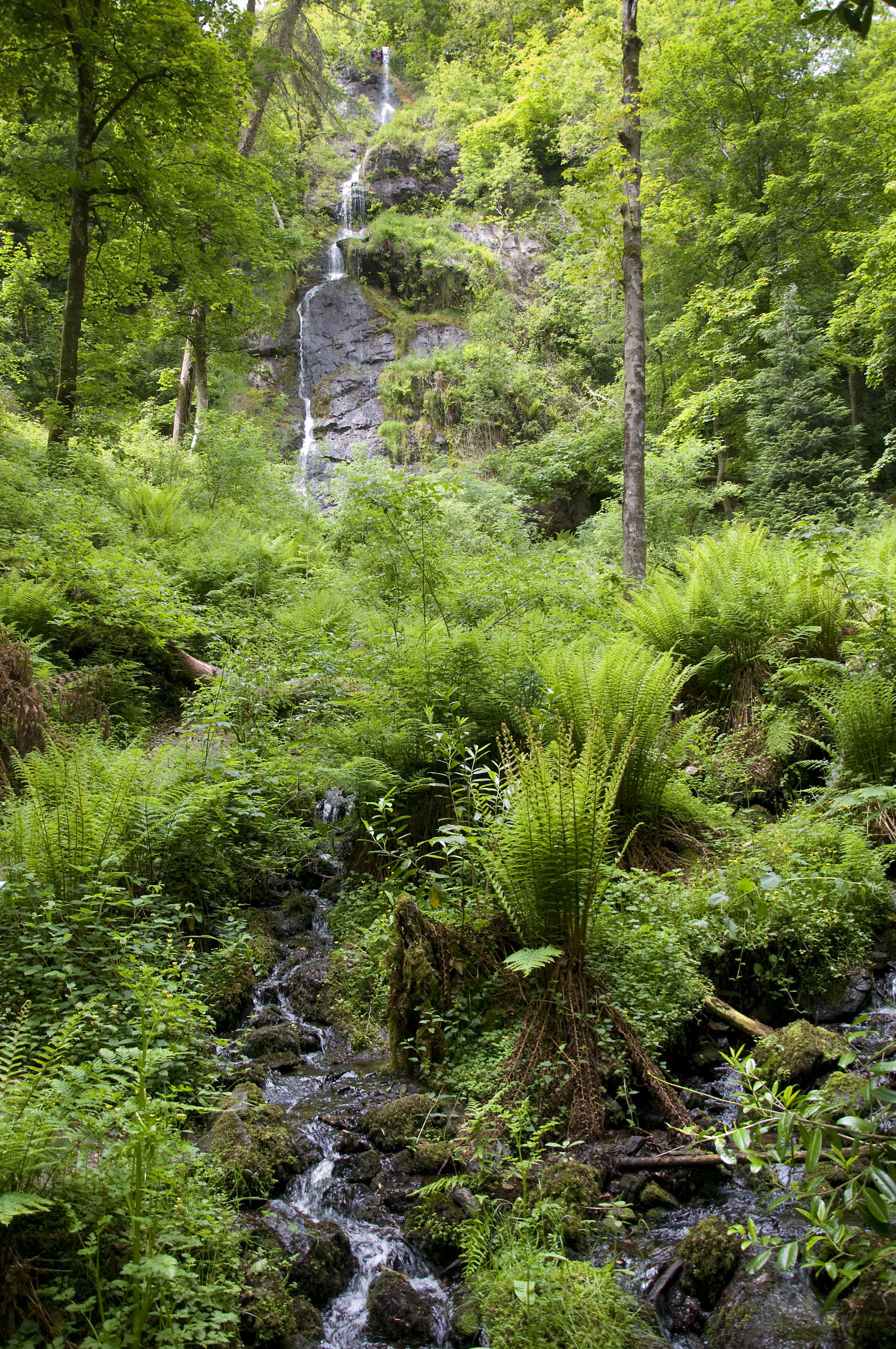
Canonteign Falls

Canonteign Falls is a waterfall in the historic tything of Canonteign in the Teign Valley and Dartmoor National Park near Chudleigh, South Devon, England.

It was created in 1890 by diverting a stream over the edge of a cliff.
