= War and Peace: The Evils of the First and a Plan for Preserving the Last =

1842 book by William Jay

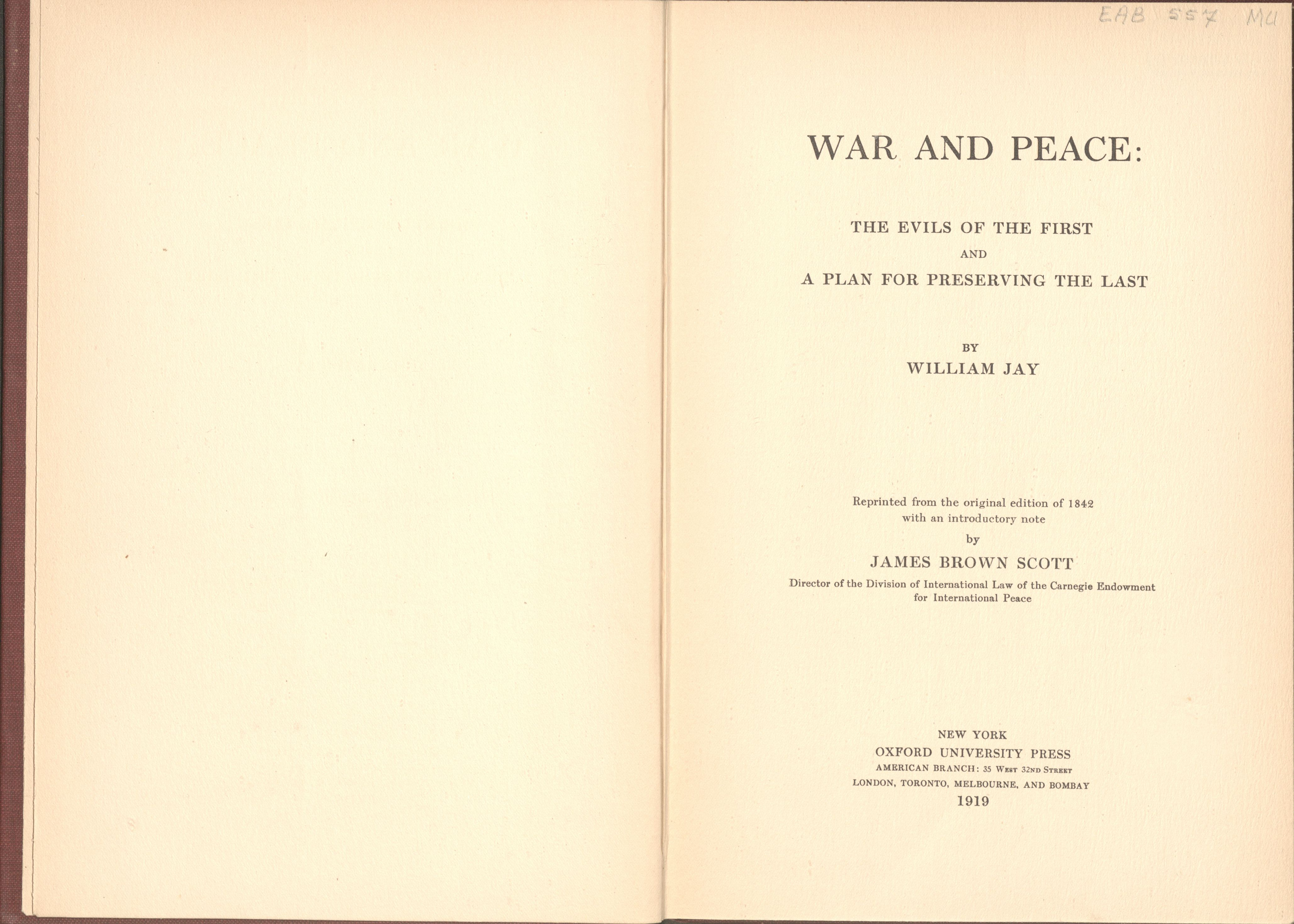
- Title page
- Author: William Jay
- Language: English
- Publication date: 1842

War and peace: the evils of the first and a plan for preserving the last is a book written by William Jay and published in 1842 that offers a critical examination of the horrors of war and proposes strategies for maintaining peace. Over the years, the book has been reissued in various editions, reflecting its enduring relevance in discussions on war, peace, ethics, and international relations. The initial release is believed to have influenced the Treaty of Paris in 1856, where the signatory nations expressed a preference for using diplomatic means, like the intervention of a friendly nation, before resorting to military action.

== Context ==
In the decades leading up to the publication of the book, the geopolitical landscape of Europe was characterized by ongoing military conflicts and political tensions. Great Britain and France, long-standing adversaries throughout the 18th century, were engaged in both military and colonial rivalry. As Britain continued its imperial expansion, especially after the Seven Years' War (1756–1763), it overshadowed France in overseas territories, establishing dominance in North America and India. On the continent, the rivalry between Austria and Prussia shaped the military landscape, with Prussia's militaristic rise challenging the Austrian Habsburgs' dominance in Central Europe. Russia, despite emerging as a significant power under rulers like Peter the Great and Catherine the Great, Tsar's rule created significant unrest, laying the groundwork for later revolutionary movements against imperial authority. In the United States The American Revolution took place in 1776 and the colonies secured their independence in 1783, marking the first major colonial uprising against European imperial powers and providing inspiration for other revolutionary movements worldwide. Later on Europe was heavily impacted by the Napoleonic Wars (1803–1815), which reshaped the continent and prolonged periods of political unrest. In America, the War of 1812 further strained relations with Britain and intensified debates on the nation's military policies.

As the son of John Jay, a distinguished diplomat and the United States’ first Chief Justice, William was exposed to a deep understanding of international relations and law and his concern for peace were deep and also nurtured since his childhood. Jay went to Yale College, studied law and served as a judge in Westchester County from 1818 until 1843. He developed a strong disdain for war, which he saw as unnecessary, immoral and socially harmful. As a judge, he became more involved in organized peace efforts later in life, joining the American Peace Society in 1842 and serving as its president from 1848 until his death. William’s influential book Inquiry into the Character and Tendency of the American Colonization and American Anti-slavery Societies criticized colonization efforts, which sought to relocate freed African Americans to Africa. His writings greatly contributed to the abolitionist cause, making him a significant figure among political abolitionists. The constant conflicts at the time fostered a growing awareness of the need for peaceful alternatives to war, laying the groundwork for peace advocates like Jay to propose means of resolving international disputes. He believed that, like the abolition of the slave trade and liquor traffic, war could be eradicated by public opinion and organized efforts, suggesting that nations include arbitration clauses in treaties to prevent conflict. To create the awareness for conflict prevention, arbitration and the abolitionism of war, he wrote the book War and peace: the evils of the first and a plan for preserving the last.

== Contents ==
The book begins with a title page and a citation of a person named Franklin: "We daily make great improvements in natural, there is one I wish to see in moral philosophy - the discovery of a plan that would induce and oblige nations to settle their disputes without first cutting one another's throats." The included citation hints at the purpose of the book, which is to propose a plan for peaceful conflict resolution. The book is not divided into chapters and is written in an essay style, although main themes can be derived. The first few pages serve as an introduction to the potential for moral and political reform through non-violent means. As determined individuals, often overlooked or underestimated, in the past have achieved transformative change, the author argues, similar efforts can be applied to ending war and positioning peace.

The book then focuses on war, its causes and casualties. Before mentioning specific historical events the author gives a more general overview of what a war is and what is the cost of it. A fundamental misconception that war is sometimes required to prevent worse evils is addressed and a misallocation of resources is critiqued, where nations spend billions on military infrastructures that could otherwise be invested in education, science, public health, and social welfare. The author then explores the causes of war, in particular, the role of national honor as a justification for war, critiquing its shallow and often hypocritical use by political leaders. One key example cited is the First Opium War where British officials framed the war in terms of national security and honor, while the author reveals the true motive: financial gain through an immoral drug trade. The author criticizes America's similar misuse of national honor when the U.S. government refused international treaties aimed at eradicating the slave trade, effectively protecting the interests of slaveholders during the period of Slavery in the United States. Further in the book, the outcomes of wars are examined. While looking at the economic and social costs of wars, the Napoleonic Wars, American Revolutionary War and War of 1812 served as examples, where multiple nations experienced substantial economic strain, rising public discontent, institutional instability, consolidated arbitrary power, strengthened dictatorships and moral and psychological degradation, showing the futility of war. The unpredictability and irony of war outcomes are also mentioned by addressing the unforeseen consequence of the independence of America after the Revolutionary War. Throughout the section, the author also emphasizes how wars often arose out of a failure to pursue peaceful negotiations.

The end of the book is dedicated to means of attaining peace. The author begins by criticizing the popular maxim "to preserve peace, it is necessary to be prepared for war" stating that the possession of a military force can provoke envy and hostility from others, rather than serving as a deterrent. Moral reform and the spread of Christian values are mentioned as well for a future where nations could establish an international tribunal to serve as a means to unify and hold the responsibility of maintaining peace in the world. Jay advocates for the United States to lead in promoting global peace through non-violent means as he states that: "The local situation of our Republic, and the nature of her foreign relations, seem to indicate her as the first of the nations of the earth by whom the sword is to be sheathed, to be drawn no more”. The hope for the other nations to follow the example of the United States is expressed and the vision of future includes the creation of a global tribunal to arbitrate international disputes, preventing wars.

== Reception ==
The book was first published in the United States in 1842 and was met with mostly a positive reception. It gained more recognition overseas as according to David N Gellman who wrote a book about the Jay family, in Britain, it was very well-received, with the London Peace Society producing 4,000 additional copies for the 1842 Conference of the Friends of Peace, indicating strong support and interest. Copies of the book were presented to every Member of Parliament, to the ambassadors of foreign countries residing in London, English prime minister, the kings of Belgium and France, and to President John Tyler. A Quaker reformer Joseph Sturge was impressed by Jay's manuscript, which proposed arbitration agreements between nations, leading Sturge to advocate for his ideas in a growing movement. Another author James Brown Scott wrote an article about Mexico and the United States relations and arbitration and mentions that though it is difficult to measure the exact influence of Jay's work, his ideas were seen as prescient and significant. The book is believed to have contributed to the broader discourse on international arbitration, particularly influencing the principles later adopted in the Treaty of Paris in 1856. However, the reaction in the United States was harsher. The Boston Quarterly Review harshly ridiculed the author’s peace advocacy, mocking him as more "suited for the moon than Earth", while defending war as preferable to living and dying in slavery considering that the nation was under risk of war. Despite this feedback, other sources state that Jay's clear articulation of peace principles and deep interest in U.S.-Mexico relations may have influenced the 1848 Treaty of Guadalupe Hidalgo formulation.

In one journal article "Pioneers of Peace" it was written that when politicians began to implement the peace movement's agenda into political action, Jay's plan was the one that captured their serious attention, particularly regarding the resolution of future disputes. The author's proposal for arbitration, supported by Joseph Sturge and the English Peace Society, gained significant recognition at peace congresses in Brussels (1848), Paris (1849), and London (1851). It was later endorsed by protocol No. 23 at the Congress of Paris in 1856, following the Crimean War, where several major powers - including France, Austria, Great Britain, Prussia, Russia, Sardinia, and Turkey - unanimously agreed to seek arbitration through a friendly power before resorting to military conflict.

After the publication, War and Peace made Jay one of the most recognized Americans in England, where he was greatly admired, particularly by reform-minded individuals. The judge kept on engaging in the peace movement and wrote other works related to the topic, one of which, A Review Of The Causes And Consequences Of The Mexican War, gained huge attention.
