= New York City Department of Juvenile Justice =

New York City government agency

Department of Juvenile Justice
Department overview
- Jurisdiction: New York City
- Headquarters: 110 William Street, 14th Floor New York, NY 10038
- Key document: New York City Charter
- Website: www.nyc.gov/acs

The New York City Department of Juvenile Justice was the department of the government of New York City that provided secure and non-secure pre-conviction detention facilities for youths aged between 7 and 16. On December 7, 2010 Mayor Michael Bloomberg signed legislation officially merging the Department of Juvenile Justice into the Administration for Children's Services.

== Facilities ==
=== Crossroads Juvenile Center ===
Crossroads Juvenile Center is a secure detention facility located in the Brownsville section of Brooklyn. The center was opened on August 1, 1998.

=== Horizon Juvenile Center ===
Horizon Juvenile Center is a secure detention facility located in the Mott Haven area of the Bronx. The center was opened on January 18, 1998.

=== SEEDS (Sowing Encouragement and Education to Develop Skills) ===
SEEDS is a non-secure facility in the Financial District in Manhattan. SEEDS provided an alternative to secure detention for young people in the Department's custody. It provided residential care for alleged Juvenile Delinquents in a less restrictive setting while they awaited disposition of their cases in Family Court.

=== Other ===
The Department of Juvenile Justice oversaw a network of non-secure group homes and operated two non-secure detention facilities that were operated through contracts with private social service organizations. Non-secure detention facilities are characterized by the absence of physically restrictive hardware, construction, and procedures.

== See also ==
- New York City Administration for Children's Services
- Office of Juvenile Justice and Delinquency Prevention
- Youth detention center
