= George Pellew =

English churchman and theologian

- Born: 3 April 1793; Flushing, Cornwall
- Died: 13 October 1866 (aged 73)
- Education: Eton College
- Alma mater: Corpus Christi College, Oxford
- Spouse: Frances Addington (m. 1820)

George Pellew (3 April 1793– 13 October 1866) was an English churchman and theologian, Dean of Norwich from 1828 to 1866.

== Life ==
He was third son of Edward Pellew, 1st Viscount Exmouth and his wife Susan Pellew (nee Frowde) and was born at Flushing, Cornwall, in 3 April 1793. He was educated at Eton College from 1808 to 1811, and admitted as gentleman-commoner at Corpus Christi College, Oxford, on 20 March 1812, graduating B.A. 1815, M.A. 1818, and B.D. and D.D. in November 1828. In 1817 he was ordained in the Church of England.

With family connections, his church preferment was rapid. In February 1819 he became, by the gift of the lord chancellor, vicar of Nazeing, Essex. In November 1820 he was advanced by the same patron to the vicarage of Sutton-in-the-Forest, or Sutton Galtries, Yorkshire. He subsequently was appointed seventh canon in Canterbury Cathedral (14 November 1822 to 1828), rector of St. George-the-Martyr, Canterbury (1827–8), prebendary of Osbaldwick at York Cathedral (15 February 1824 to September 1828), and prebendary of Wistow there (18 September 1828 to 1852). He became rector of St Dionis Backchurch, London (October 1828 to 1852), dean of Norwich 1828, and rector of Great Chart, Kent, 1852; and he held the last two preferments until his death.

As Dean of Norwich he had a seat in convocation, where he took an active part in the debates, as a moderate. Pellew died at the rectory, Great Chart, on 13 October 1866, and the east window of the church was afterwards filled with stained glass in his memory.

== Works ==
Pellew printed sermons and tracts, including a ‘Letter to Sir Robert Peel on the means of rendering Cathedral Churches most conducive to the Efficiency of the Established Church.’ Many of his sermons were included in two volumes printed in 1848, and entitled ‘Sermons on many of the leading Doctrines and Duties taught by the Church of England.’ In 1847 he published ‘The Life and Correspondence of Addington, first Viscount Sidmouth,’ his father-in-law.

== Family ==
He married, on 20 June 1820, Frances, second daughter of Henry Addington, Prime Minister and first Viscount Sidmouth, and left one son Henry Pellew (who inherited but chose not to assume the title Viscount Exmouth in 1922), and three daughters. His widow died at Speen Hill House, Newbury, Berkshire, on 27 February 1870.

== Notes ==
Attribution

This article incorporates text from a publication now in the public domain: "Pellew, George". Dictionary of National Biography. London: Smith, Elder & Co. 1885–1900.
