= Paul Pellew, 10th Viscount Exmouth =

British peer

The Right Honourable The Viscount Exmouth

Member of the House of Lords
- Lord Temporal
- as a hereditary peer 2 December 1970 – 11 November 1999
- Preceded by: The 9th Viscount Exmouth
- Succeeded by: Seat abolished (Note: Pursuant to the House of Lords Act 1999.)

Personal details
- Born: Paul Edward Pellew; 8 October 1940 (age 85)
- Died: before 2026
- Party: Crossbencher (non-affiliated)
- Relations: Earls of Iddesleigh; Marqueses de Amurrio
- Education: Downside School

Insignia of a baronet

Paul Edward Pellew, 10th Viscount Exmouth, 9th Marquess of Olías (born 8 October 1940, died before 2026), was a British hereditary peer, who succeeded his father, Pownoll Pellew, 9th Viscount Exmouth (1908–1970), upon the latter's death.

Despite succeeding to the family titles in 1970, Lord Exmouth did not make his maiden speech in the House of Lords until 20 December 1995. He opened his speech, which was on the subject of chequebook journalism, with a statement that his main interests lay with the tourist industry.

In 1999, Viscount Exmouth was recognized by the Spanish government as the Marquess of Olías, a title in the Spanish nobility dating from 1652 and previously held by his mother, María Luisa de Urquijo y Losada (1911–1994).

== Family ==
The Hon. Paul Pellew, as he was then, married firstly in 1964 (divorced 1974) Maria Krystina de Garay y Garay (1943–2005), by whom he had an only child:

- Hon. Patricia Sofia Pellew (born 14 April 1966)

Viscount Exmouth married secondly in 1975 (divorced 2000), as her second husband, Rosemary Frances Beauclerk, Countess of Burford (who married thirdly in 2020 William Coleridge, 5th Baron Coleridge), only daughter of Dr Francis Harold Scoones, having twin sons:

- Edward Francis Pellew, 11th Viscount Exmouth (born 30 October 1978), married 2023 Catherine Mary Reed, daughter of Simon and Elizabeth Reed from Shropshire.
- Hon. Alexander Paul Pellew (born 30 October 1978).

He married thirdly in 2002 (divorced 2003) Sarah née Goalen (1942–2013; widow of Anthony Samuel Edgar).

== Arms ==
Coat of arms of Paul Pellew, 10th Viscount Exmouth
Crest Upon the waves of the sea the wreck of the Dutton East Indianman upon a rocky shore off Plymouth Garrison all Proper. Escutcheon Gules a Lion passant guardant in chief two Chaplets of laurel Or on a Chief of Augmentation wavy a representation of Algiers with a British Man-of-War before it all Proper. Supporters Dexter a Lion rampant guardant Or navally crowned Azure resting the dexter paw upon a decrescent Argent, sinister a Male figure representing slavery trowsers Argent striped Azure the upper part of the body naked holding in the dexter hand broken chains Proper the sinister arm elevated and holding a Cross Or. Motto Deo Adjuvante (above the crest), Algiers (below the shield)

== See also ==
- Exmouth Market

== Notes ==
Peerage of the United Kingdom
Preceded by Pownoll Pellew, 9th Viscount Exmouth	Viscount Exmouth; 1970–before 2026; Member of the House of Lords (1970–1999)	Succeeded by Edward Pellew, 11th Viscount Exmouth
Preceded by Pownoll Pellew, 9th Viscount Exmouth	Baron Exmouth; 1970–before 2026	Succeeded by Edward Pellew, 11th Viscount Exmouth
Baronetage of Great Britain
Preceded by Pownoll Pellew, 9th Viscount Exmouth	Baronet of Exmouth; 1970–before2026	Succeeded by Edward Pellew, 11th Viscount Exmouth
Spanish nobility
Preceded by María Luisa de Urquijo y Losada	Marquess of Olias; 1999–before2026	Succeeded by tbd
