= Wilson, Sons =

Shipping company in Rio de Janeiro, Brazil

Wilson, Sons Limited
- Company type: Public limited company
- Traded as: B3: PORT3
- Industry: Port and Maritime Logistics
- Founded: 1837; 189 years ago
- Founder: Edward and Fleetwood Pellew Wilson
- Headquarters: Rio de Janeiro, Brazil
- Area served: Brazil
- Key people: Arnaldo Calbucci Filho, (CEO)
- Products: Port Terminals, Towage, Logistics, Shipping Agency, Offshore, and Shipyards.
- Revenue: ▲US$ 666.2 million (2012)
- Net income: ▼US$ 49.5 million (2012)
- Owner: SAS Ship Agency Services Limited
- Number of employees: 4,936
- Website: wilsonsons.com.br

Wilson Sons (B3: PORT3) is a Brazilian shipping company headquartered in Rio de Janeiro, Brazil. The firm was set up in Salvador in 1837 by two Scottish brothers, Edward and Fleetwood Pellew Wilson. The firm is one of the oldest private enterprises in Brazil. It was later run by Edward's son, Edward Pellew Wilson Jr.

Wilson Sons were responsible for construction and provision of supplies and equipment for the Great Western and Count d'Eu Railroads in Brazil. The group built the first dry dock in Brazil, on the Ilha de Mocangue Pequeno Island, inaugurated in 1869 by Emperor Dom Pedro II.

The company has developed an extensive national network and provides a comprehensive set of services related to domestic and international trade, as well as to the oil and gas industry. Its principal operating activities are divided into the following lines of business: port terminals, towage, logistics, shipping agency, offshore, and shipyards.

In October 2024, its majority shareholder Ocean Wilsons, filed with Brazil's Securities Commission to sell a 56.47% interest in the firm to MSC. Approved by the Brazilian Administrative Council for Economic Defense (CADE) and the National Water Transport Agency (ANTAQ), the transaction was completed in June 2025.

SAS Shipping Services, a wholly-owned subsidiary of MSC now owns 68.39% of the company.
