= Aviâja Egede Lynge =

Greenlandic indigenous rights activist

Aviâja Egede Lynge (born 1974) is a Greenlandic social anthropologist who actively supports the rights of indigenous Inuit. In her native Greenland, she has contributed to training teachers to appreciate their cultural identity and their indigenous rights. Since 2015, she has been Greenland's Spokesperson for the Rights of the Child (børnetalsmand), a position she was invited to maintain until 2025.

== Early life and education ==
Born in Greenland in 1974, Aviâja Egede Lynge was brought up in an indigenous cultural environment. Her parents and grandparents, including a Danish grandmother, were keen on gaining cultural and language rights for Greenland.

After attending high school in Greenland, she earned a master's degree in social anthropology from the University of Edinburgh in Scotland. She takes a special interest in the history of indigenous peoples, both in Greenland and internationally.

== Career ==
From 2006, Lynge headed the department of further education at the University of Greenland, where she developed teaching diploma courses and a master's degree programme for Greenland's teachers. She has also taught social anthropology and has participated in educational reforms.

In 2015, she was appointed Spokesperson for the Rights of the Child in Greenland, who is also head of the National Advocacy for Children's Rights Center in Greenland (also translated as Greenlandic Children's Rights Institution), or MIO. She followed the inaugural spokesperson and head of MIO, Aaja Chemnitz, who served until 2015 at the organisation, which was established in 2012 by the Greenlandic Government. The appointments are usually for a three-year term, but in 2021, Lynge was appointed to remain in the position until 2025.

Two years later, she was appointed a board member of the International Work Group for Indigenous Affairs (IWGIA).

In 2020, she became a member of the General Assembly of the International Indigenous Women's Forum.

== Other activities ==
Lynge has been active in coordinating improvements in education for the indigenous inhabitants of Canada and Alaska. In 2013, she represented Arctic women at the World Conference for Indigenous Women in Lima, Peru.
