= Viscount Exmouth =

Title in the Peerage of the United Kingdom peerage

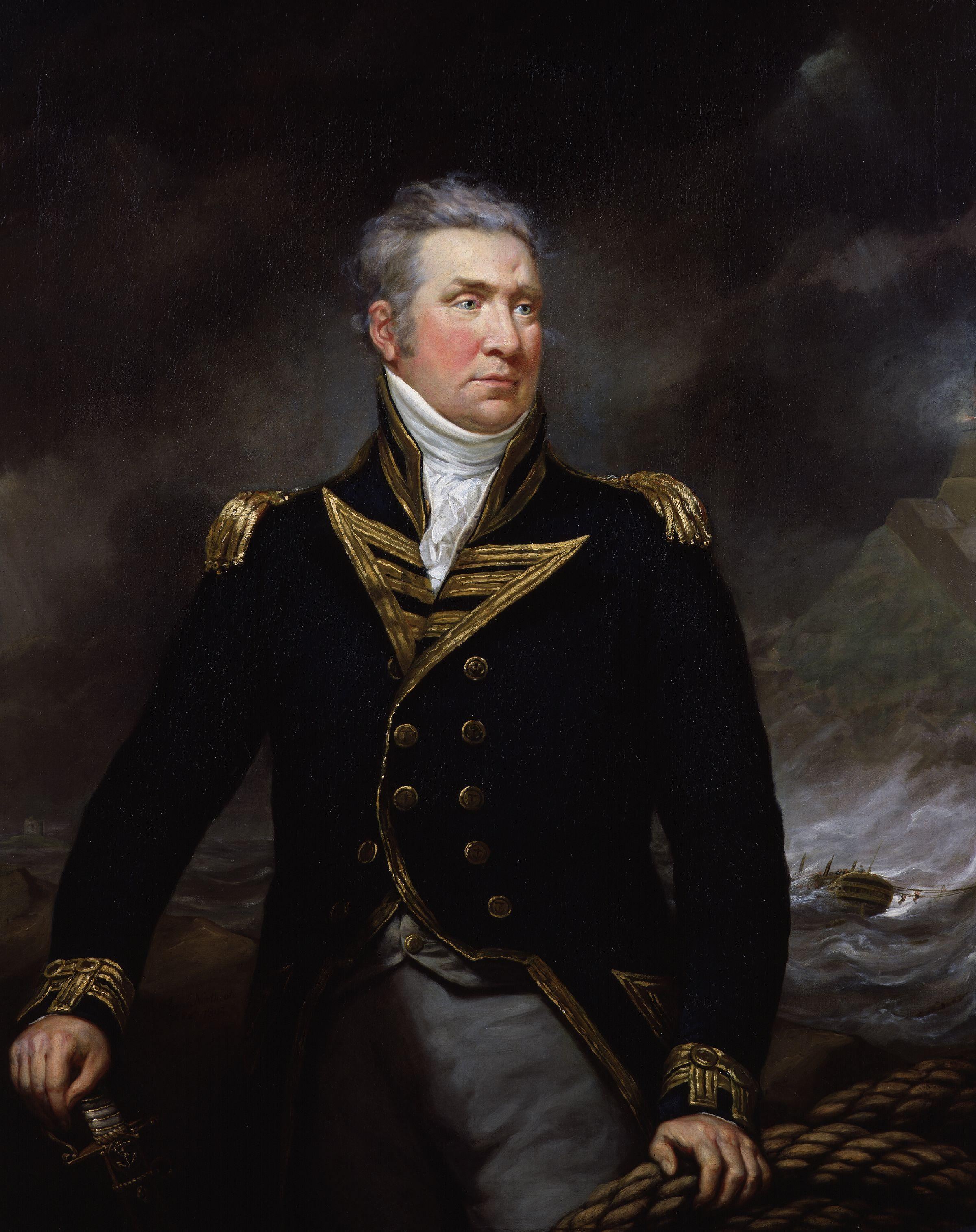
Edward Pellew, 1st Viscount Exmouth

Viscount Exmouth, of Canonteign in the County of Devon, is a title in the peerage of the United Kingdom.

== History ==
The title was created in 1816 for the prominent naval officer Edward Pellew, 1st Baron Exmouth. He had already been created a baronet in the baronetage of Great Britain on 18 March 1796 for rescuing the crew of the East Indiaman Dutton. After a succession of commands culminating as Commander of the Mediterranean Fleet, he was created Baron Exmouth, of Canonteign in the County of Devon, in the peerage of the United Kingdom in 1814. He was advanced as a Viscount, with the same designation, for the successful bombardment of Algiers in 1816, which secured the release of the 1,000 Christian slaves in the city.

He was succeeded by his eldest son, the second Viscount, who represented Launceston in Parliament. On the death in 1922 of the second Viscount's great-grandson, the fifth Viscount, this line of the family failed. He was succeeded by his 94-year-old first cousin twice removed, the sixth Viscount. He was the son of the Hon. and Very Revd George Pellew, Dean of Norwich, third son of the first Viscount. Partly due to having become a U.S. citizen, and partly due to his advanced age, the sixth Viscount did not use his title for the brief period he held it, nor did he claim his seat in the House of Lords. Only six months after succeeding to his titles, the sixth Viscount died. He was succeeded by his son, the seventh Viscount, a naturalised U.S. citizen and professor of chemistry. Having succeeded to the peerage, the seventh Viscount returned to England in 1923 and again became a British subject, taking his seat in the House of Lords in 1931. Upon his death without any surviving issue in 1945, this line of the family also failed.

The title then passed to the seventh Viscount's second cousin, the eighth Viscount. He was the grandson of the Hon. and Revd Edward Pellew, fourth son of the first Viscount. His son, the ninth Viscount, married María Luisa de Urquijo y Losada, Marquesa de Olías, a title of Spanish nobility created by King Philip IV in 1652. They were succeeded in their respective titles by their son, Paul Pellew, as 10th Viscount Exmouth and 9th Marquess of Olías.

The family seat was Canonteign House, near Exeter in Devon.

== Pellew baronets (1796) ==
- Edward Pellew, 1st Baronet (1757–1833) (created Baron Exmouth in 1814)

=== Baron Exmouth (1814) ===
- Edward Pellew, 1st Baron Exmouth (1757–1833) (created Viscount Exmouth in 1816)

=== Viscount Exmouth (1816) ===
- Edward Pellew, 1st Viscount Exmouth (1757–1833)
- Pownoll Bastard Pellew, 2nd Viscount Exmouth (1786–1833)
- Edward Pellew, 3rd Viscount Exmouth (1811–1876)
- Edward Fleetwood John Pellew, 4th Viscount Exmouth (1861–1899)
- Edward Addington Hargreaves Pellew, 5th Viscount Exmouth (1890–1922)
- Henry Edward Pellew, 6th Viscount Exmouth (1828–1923)
- Charles Ernest Pellew, 7th Viscount Exmouth (1863–1945)
- Edward Irving Pownoll Pellew, 8th Viscount Exmouth (1868–1951)
- Pownoll Irving Edward Pellew, 9th Viscount Exmouth (1908–1970)
- Paul Pellew, 10th Viscount Exmouth (1940–before 2026)
- Edward Francis Pellew, 11th Viscount Exmouth (born 1978)

The heir apparent is the present holder's son, the Hon. Leo Edward Pellew (born 2023).

=== Title succession chart ===
Title succession chart, Viscounts Exmouth.

Edward Pellew; 1st Viscount Exmouth; 1757–1833
Pownoll Pellew; 2nd Viscount Exmouth; 1786–1833	Admiral Sir; Fleetwood Pellew; 1789–1861	Very Rev. Hon. George Pellew; 1793–1866	Rev. Hon. Edward Pellew; 1799–1869
Edward Pellew; 3rd Viscount Exmouth; 1811–1876	Hon. Percy Pellew; 1814–1848	Hon. Pownoll Pellew; 1823–1851	Hon. Fleetwood Pellew; 1830–1866	Hon. Barrington Pellew; 1833–1858	Thomas Pellew; 1818–1819	Henry Pellew; 6th Viscount Exmouth; 1828–1923	Cdr. Pownoll Pellew; 1837–1872
Edward Pellew; 4th Viscount Exmouth; 1861–1899	William Pellew; 1859–1892	Charles Pellew; 7th Viscount Exmouth; 1863–1945	Edward Pellew; 8th Viscount Exmouth; 1868–1951
Edward Pellew; 5th Viscount Exmouth; 1890–1922	Pownoll Pellew; 9th Viscount Exmouth; 1908–1970
Paul Pellew; 10th Viscount Exmouth born 1940
Edward Pellew, 11th Viscount Exmouth born 1978
Hon. Leo Edward Pellew (born 2023)

=== Line of succession ===
- Edward Pellew, 1st Viscount Exmouth (1757–1833)
  - Pownoll Bastard Pellew, 2nd Viscount Exmouth (1786–1833)
    - Edward Pellew, 3rd Viscount Exmouth (1811–1876)
    - Hon. Fleetwood John Pellew (1830–1866)
      - Edward Fleetwood John Pellew, 4th Viscount Exmouth (1861–1899)
        - Edward Addington Hargreaves Pellew, 5th Viscount Exmouth (1890–1922)
  - Very Rev. Hon. George Pellew (1793–1866)
    - Henry Edward Pellew, 6th Viscount Exmouth (1828–1923)
      - Charles Ernest Pellew, 7th Viscount Exmouth (1863–1945)
  - Rev. Hon. Edward William Pellew (1799–1869)
    - Cdr. Pownoll William Pellew (1837–1872)
      - Edward Irving Pownoll Pellew, 8th Viscount Exmouth (1868–1951)
        - Pownoll Irving Edward Pellew, 9th Viscount Exmouth (1908–1970)
          - Paul Edward Pellew, 10th Viscount Exmouth (1940–before 2026)
            - Edward Francis Pellew, 11th Viscount Exmouth (born 1978)
              - (1) Hon. Leo Edward Pellew (born 2023).
            - (2) Hon. Alexander Paul Pellew (born 1978)
          - (3) Hon. Peter Irving Pellew (born 1942)
    - Fleetwood Hugo Pellew (1838–1906)
      - Fleetwood Hugo Pellew (1871–1961)
        - Cdr. Anthony Pownoll Pellew (1911–1992)
          - (4) Mark Edward Pellew (born 1942)
            - (5) Adam Lee Pellew (born 1966)
            - (6) Dominic Stephen Pellew (born 1968)
          - (7) Robert Anthony Pellew (born 1945)
            - (8) Toby James Pownoll Pellew (born 1982)
          - (9) Nicholas Charles Pellew (born 1959)
            - (10) Christopher Anthony Lloyd Pellew (born 1992)
          - (11) Philip Esmond Pellew (born 1962)
        - Myles Addington Pellew (1919–2017)
          - (12) Simon Du Pre Pellew (born 1959)
            - (13) Dominic Pellew (born 1997)
        - (14) Timothy Winthrop Pellew (born 1921)
          - (15) Fleetwood Timothy Pellew (born 1952)
          - (16) Adrian Harold Pellew (born 1954)
            - (17) Adam Timothy Edmund Pellew (born 2000)
          - (18) Owen Simon Pellew (born 1958)
          - (19) Colin David Pellew (born 1961)

== Arms ==
Coat of arms of Viscount Exmouth
Crest Upon the waves of the sea the wreck of the Dutton East Indianman upon a rocky shore off Plymouth garrison all Proper. Escutcheon Gules a Lion passant guardant in chief two Chaplets of Laurel Or on a Chief of Augmentation wavy a representation of Algiers with a British Man-of-War before it all Proper. Supporters Dexter a Lion rampant guardant Or navally crowned Azure resting the dexter paw upon a decrescent Argent, sinister a Male figure representing slavery trowsers Argent striped Azure the upper part of the body naked holding in the dexter hand broken chains Proper the sinister arm elevated and holding a cross Or. Motto Deo Adjuvante (over the crest), Algiers (below the shield)

Baronetage of Great Britain
Preceded by Farquhar baronets	Pellew baronets of Treverry; 18 March 1796	Succeeded by Bellingham baronets
