= Fleetwood Pellew =

Royal Navy officer (1789–1861)

Admiral Sir Fleetwood Pellew CB KCH
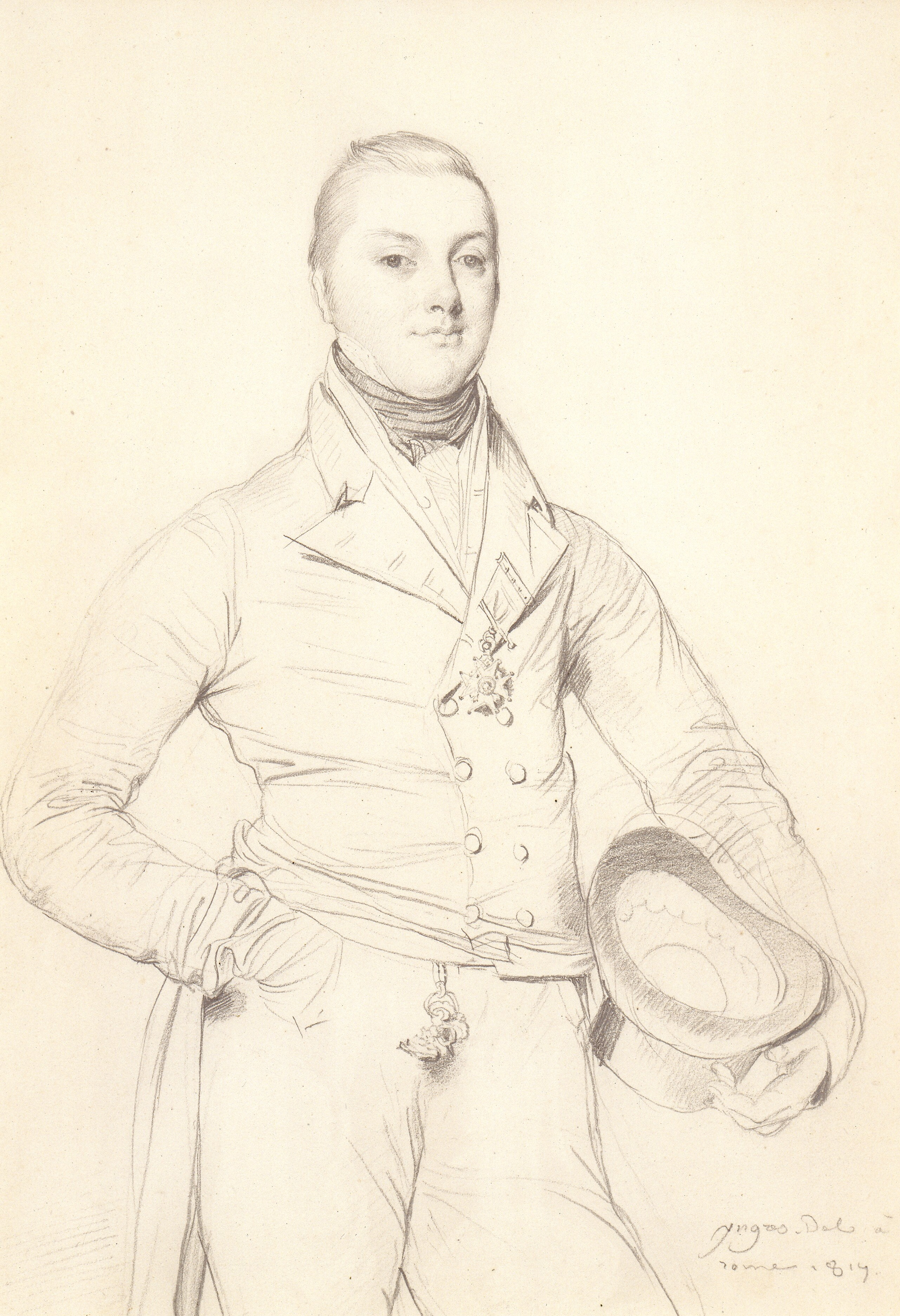
- Portrait by Jean-Auguste-Dominique Ingres, 1817
- Born: 13 December 1789; England
- Died: 28 July 1861 (aged 71); Marseille, France
- Spouse: Harriet Webster (m. 1816-1849; her death)
- Military career
- Allegiance: Great Britain; United Kingdom
- Branch: Royal Navy
- Service years: 1799–1861
- Rank: Admiral
- Commands: HMS Rattlesnake; HMS Terpsichore; HMS Psyche; HMS Powerful; HMS Cornwallis; HMS Phaeton; HMS Iphigenia; HMS Resistance
- Awards: Knighthood; Companion of the Bath; Knight Commander of the Royal Guelphic Order

Admiral Sir Fleetwood Broughton Reynolds Pellew CB KCH (13 December 1789 – 28 July 1861) was a Royal Navy officer who served in the French Revolutionary and Napoleonic Wars.

He was the son of Captain Edward Pellew, who later became an admiral and first Viscount Exmouth. The elder Pellew used his influence within the navy to secure positions for his two eldest sons in the service. Fleetwood received his first command when he was just 17, but seemed to justify it with his gallantry and daring, which won him the admiration of his father. His career was noted for a brief incident in Nagasaki harbour while in command of the frigate HMS Phaeton, an incident that was to have important implications for Anglo-Japanese relations.

Fleetwood's doting father helped him rise through the ranks, but a tendency towards excessive harshness in command proved his downfall. He provoked a mutiny in 1814 and though he returned to sea in 1818, he received no further active commands after 1822 for thirty years. He briefly returned to service with the rank of rear-admiral and a post as commander-in-chief in the East Indies and China, but soon provoked another mutiny aboard his flagship, and was recalled. He never again served at sea, and died in 1861 with the rank of admiral.

== Family and early life ==
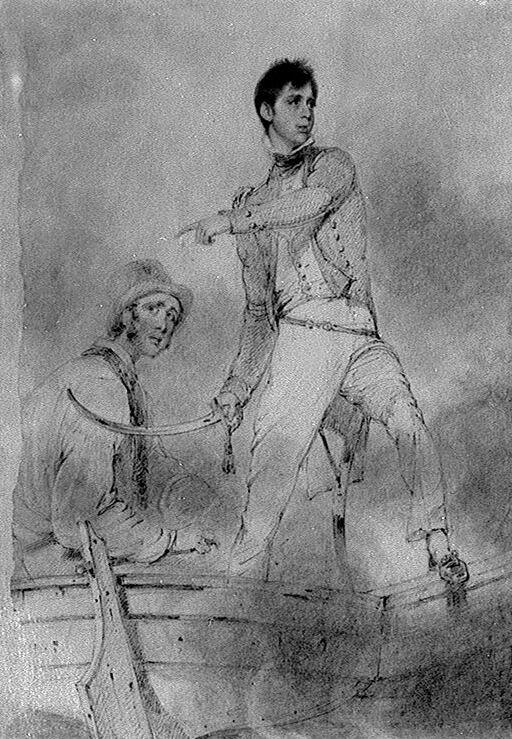
Illustration of Pellew (right) during the raid on Batavia

Fleetwood Pellew was born on 13 December 1789, the second son and fourth child of Captain Edward Pellew and his wife Susan Frowde. He was educated briefly at Blundell's School, Tiverton. His father was promoted through the ranks of the service during the French Revolutionary and Napoleonic Wars, and used his influence to find positions at sea for Fleetwood and his elder brother Pownoll. Fleetwood joined his father's ship, the 74-gun HMS Impetueux, as a midshipman in March 1799, and followed him to HMS Tonnant and then to HMS Culloden. The two sailed for the East Indies aboard the Culloden, where on 8 September 1804 Sir Edward made Fleetwood a lieutenant aboard HMS Sceptre.

Fleetwood was soon back aboard the Culloden, where he distinguished himself at the raid on Batavia of 27 November 1806, during the Java campaign of 1806–1807. Sir Edward, writing to his friend Alex Broughton in England recorded:

He led the squadron with the greatest judgement ... He placed his ship ag't the Dutch frigate and batteries with equal skill and led in the boats to Boarding ... I assure you, a prettier exploit I never saw. You will say Aye, Aye, here is the Father. I have done - but I assure you I say not half of what others say of him. My heart swelled when I heard a general shout on board Culloden - Well done Fleetwood, well done, bravo - was the cry all around me. What Father could have kept his Eyes dry? I was obliged to wipe them again before I looked thro' the glass.

— Sir Edward Pellew to Alex Broughton,

Sir Edward promoted Fleetwood to his first command, that of the 18-gun sloop HMS Rattlesnake in 1807. He was just 17 at the time. Service on the frigates HMS Terpsichore and HMS Psyche followed. Fleetwood was described by his father during this time as being 'beyond comparison the finest youth of the Squadron, universally beloved', 'a real treasure' and 'the flower of my flock and the flower of my fleet'. He was confirmed in the rank of commander by his father on 12 October 1807, and was appointed acting commander of the 74-gun HMS Powerful, followed by command of HMS Cornwallis in 1808. He moved to the 38-gun HMS Phaeton in July 1808. He caused a brief incident in Nagasaki harbour when he anchored there in October, captured several Dutch officials and demanded supplies for his ship. The Japanese were unable to resist him, and sent the supplies. Fleetwood was confirmed in his rank of post captain on 14 October 1808, and went on to see action in the Invasion of Île de France in 1810 and the reduction of Java in 1811. Fleetwood sailed the Phaeton home in August 1812, escorting a convoy of East Indiamen. For his services he received a present of 500 guineas and the thanks of the East India Company.

== The Mediterranean ==
Fleetwood was given command of the 36-gun HMS Iphigenia and sailed her to the Mediterranean. He left the Iphigenia to take command of the 46-gun HMS Resistance in January 1813 and in October that year was part of an attack that silenced the batteries around Port d'Anzo and captured a convoy of 29 merchants that had taken refuge there. By February 1814 though the Resistance had been ordered to return to Britain. A mutiny had broken out, which though it was quashed, led to several of the crew being condemned to death or to be flogged. The proceedings eventually broke down on a technicality, but it was widely commented on that Fleetwood's harshness had provoked the men. This marked the beginning of the decline of Pellew's career. He was appointed a Companion of the Bath in June 1815, and went on to command HMS Révolutionnaire in the Mediterranean from August 1818 to June 1822. After that, he was not given an active command, and spent the next thirty years on half-pay.

== Later years ==
Pellew continued to receive promotions and awards according to his seniority. He was given a knighthood and was appointed a Knight Commander of the Royal Guelphic Order in January 1836. He was made a naval aide-de-camp to the Queen, promoted to rear-admiral on 9 November 1846, and in December 1852 he finally returned to active service with his appointment as commander-in-chief of the East Indies and China Station.

His appointment caused some concern, with questions raised over the suitability of sending Pellew, considering his age and past background, and the unhealthy climate and tense diplomatic situation following the outbreak of the Second Anglo-Burmese War. Pellew raised his flag aboard HMS Winchester in April 1853, and by September 1854 he was off Hong Kong. Here he seems to have decided that he would not allow shore leave until the dangerous season for fevers and infections had passed, but neglected to make his reasoning known to his men. The crew were apparently in a mutinous mood, so Pellew ordered them to beat to quarters. When they refused, he sent the officers onto the lower deck to force them up at sword point. Several of the crew were wounded and the nascent mutiny was quashed. The news of these events was poorly received in Britain, The Times included several leading articles drawing attention to the mutiny on the Winchester, and the one on the Resistance many years before.

Pellew was duly recalled by the Admiralty, never to serve at sea again. He had been promoted to vice-admiral on 22 April 1853, and a full admiral on 13 February 1858.

Sir Fleetwood Pellew died at Marseille on 28 July 1861 at the age of 71.

== Marriage ==
He had married Harriet Webster (1794–1849), daughter of Sir Godfrey Webster by his first wife, Elizabeth, in 1816; the couple had a son, Thomas Chaplin (1818–1819), who died in infancy, and a daughter, Harriet Bettina Frances (1820–1886), who married Lord Horatio Walpole in 1841, thus becoming Lady Walpole and eventually Countess of Orford, when her husband succeeded to the earldom of Orford in 1858.

Harriet died in 1849, and Fleetwood married Cecile Drummond de Melfort in 1851, but the two divorced in 1859.

Admiral Pellew was buried with his first wife, Harriet (née Webster), in the English Cemetery, Florence.

== See also ==
- O'Byrne, William Richard (1849). "Pellew, Fleetwood Broughton Reynolds" . A Naval Biographical Dictionary . John Murray – via Wikisource.
- Laughton, J. K. (1895). "Pellew, Fleetwood Broughton Reynolds" . In Lee, Sidney (ed.). Dictionary of National Biography. Vol. 44. London: Smith, Elder & Co.

== Notes ==
Military offices
Preceded by Sir Charles Austen	Commander-in-Chief, East Indies and China Station; 1852–1854	Succeeded by Sir James Stirling
