= Edward Pellew, 4th Viscount Exmouth =

The Viscount Exmouth

Personal details
- Born: Edward Fleetwood John Pellew; 24 June 1861 Devon, England
- Died: October 31, 1899 (aged 38) London
- Spouse: Edith Hargreaves (m. 1884)
- Children: 2, including Edward Pellew, 5th Viscount Exmouth
- Parent(s): Fleetwood John Pellew; Emily Sarah Ferguson

Edward Fleetwood John Pellew, 4th Viscount Exmouth DL JP (24 June 1861 – 31 October 1899), was a British peer who inherited the title of Viscount Exmouth from his uncle and held the title for 23 years. He was the great-grandson of Edward Pellew, 1st Viscount Exmouth.

== Life ==
Edward Pellew was born on 24 June 1861 in the county of Devon, England. His parents were the Hon. Fleetwood John Pellew (the fourth son of Pownoll Pellew, 2nd Viscount Exmouth) and Emily Sarah Ferguson. On 3 June 1884, in Arborfield Parish, Berkshire, he married Edith Hargreaves, the daughter of Captain Thomas Hargreaves of the 3rd Royal Lancashire Militia. Their children were Georgina Cecily Pellew (18 December 1885 – 17 May 1930), who died unmarried; and Edward Addington Hargreaves Pellew, 5th Viscount Exmouth (12 November 1890 – 16 August 1922).

Pellew's service in the British Army's auxiliary forces was varied: he began his career as a lieutenant in the 1st Devon Militia (later the 4th Battalion, Devonshire Regiment). He then transferred to the Royal 1st Devon Yeomanry on 7 March 1883, but resigned his commission on 9 August 1884. Later he was re-commissioned into the 5th (The Hay Tor) Volunteer Battalion, Devonshire Regiment, promoted to lieutenant on 17 February 1897, and to captain on 9 June 1898. He was also a Deputy Lieutenant, Justice of the Peace for Devon, and a Doctor of Law.

The Viscount and Viscountess spent their honeymoon in the United States, arriving in New York City on 23 June 1884 on board the SS Gallia. At the time the Viscount's cousin, Henry Pellew, later the 6th Viscount Exmouth, and his wife resided there. The Viscountess was a cousin of the Drayton family of New York and the Coleman family of Pennsylvania. In July 1884 they visited Long Branch, New Jersey as well as Newport, Rhode Island. August saw them back in Long Branch for an extended tour by Mr. George W. Childs, the publisher of the Evening Public Ledger. They returned to England on 1 October 1884 on board the SS Servia.

When the 1st Viscount Exmouth was granted his title he also was awarded a perpetual annual pension of £2,000. These pensions were not seen favourably by the public and in late 1893 Parliament converted the pension to a lump sum payment of £53,890. This pension was well invested, and by the time of the death of the Edward Pellew, 5th Viscount Exmouth the sum had grown to £325,000.

Edward Pellew died in London on 31 October 1899. He was succeeded in his titles by his eight-year-old son Edward Pellew.

== Arms ==
Coat of arms of Edward Pellew, 4th Viscount Exmouth
Crest Upon the waves of the sea the wreck of the Dutton East Indianman upon a rocky shore off Plymouth garrison all Proper. Escutcheon Gules a lion passant guardant in chief two chaplets of laurel Or on a chief of augmentation wavy a representation of Algiers with a British Man-of-War before it all Proper. Supporters Dexter a lion rampant guardant Or navally crowned Azure resting the dexter paw upon a decrescent Argent, sinister a male figure representing slavery trowsers Argent striped Azure the upper part of the body naked holding in the dexter hand broken chains Proper the sinister arm elevated and holding a cross Or. Motto Deo Adjuvante (over the crest), Algiers (under the shield)

Peerage of the United Kingdom
Preceded by Edward Pellew	Viscount Exmouth; 1876–1899	Succeeded by Edward Pellew
