= Berkshire Industrial Farm =

Residential facility in New York, United States

Berkshire Farm Center and Services for Youth

Location
- 13640 State Route 22; Canaan, Columbia County, New York 12029; United States

Information
- School type: Residential treatment center, Juvenile detention and group homes
- Established: 1886
- Status: Open
- Gender: co-ed
- Website: www.berkshirefarm.org

The Berkshire Industrial Farm (previously known as the Burnham Industrial Farm) in Canaan, New York, was a rural residential facility for troubled young men from the New York area in the late 19th century. It operated under the name Berkshire Industrial Farm from 1886 to 1959, after which it became known as the Berkshire Centre for Boys and, in 1974, changed its name to the modern day Berkshire Farm Center and Service for Youth.

Today, it is known as Berkshire Farm Center and Services for Youth (BFC) and is one of New York State's largest non-profit child welfare agencies, serving more than 3,000 wards. It provides "community, school, at-home and on-site services" including residential treatment center placement, juvenile detention placement, foster care placement, vocational training, and group home placement.

Berkshire Farm Center's Residential Treatment Center is located in rural Canaan, New York, on 2,000 acres of land.

Berkshire Farm Center also puts children in juvenile detention. BFC owns and operates the following juvenile detention facilities: Burnham Youth Safe Center in Canaan, New York, Capital District Secure Detention in Albany, New York (which imprisons youth aged 10 to 25), Orange County Non-Secure Detention in Middletown, New York, and Warren County Non-Secure Detention in Queensbury, New York.

BFC owns and operates many group homes in the state of New York.

BFC has a contract with New York City Administration for Children's Services to receive children.
