= Mark Pellew =

British diplomat

Mark Edward Pellew CVO (born 28 August 1942), a British diplomat, was Her Britannic Majesty's Ambassador to the Holy See 1998–2002.

Pellew was educated at Winchester College and Trinity College, Oxford. He joined the Foreign Office in 1965. He was 1st Secretary in Rome 1976–1980, and Assistant Head of the Personnel Operations Department 1981–1983. He was seconded to Hambros Bank (1989–1991), and served as a Counsellor in Washington (1983–1989). He was Head of the North American Department at the Foreign and Commonwealth Office (1991–1996).

After leaving the Diplomatic Service he was Chief Executive to the Secretary-General of the Anglican Consultative Council 2002–05.
