= Edward Pellew Wilson Jr. =

Brazilian businessman (1832–1899)

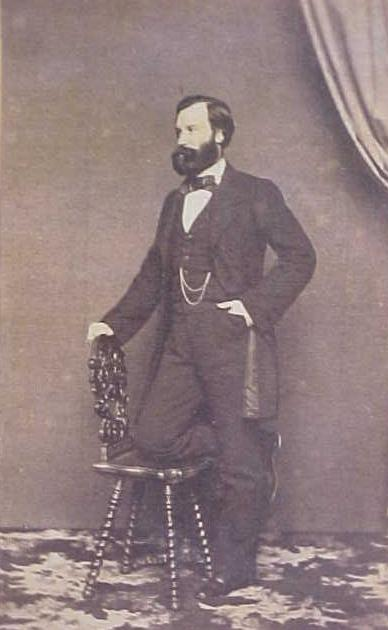
Edward Pellew Wilson Jr.

Edward Pellew Wilson Jr., Count of Wilson (31 March 1832 in Salvador, Bahia – 19 September 1899 in Rio de Janeiro City, Rio de Janeiro State) was a British-Brazilian businessman.

== Biography ==
Wilson Jr. was the eldest son of Edward Pellew Wilson, a wealthy Scottish businessman and a cousin of Sir James Milne Wilson, who had settled in Brazil, founding the shipping firm of Wilson & Sons. Wilson Jr. was also a godchild of Lord Exmouth, his grandfather's friend. He and his brothers were engineers and developed business in Brazil, Portugal and France. He held shares in various financial companies of Rio de Janeiro and railway companies of France and in 1884, founded the Telephone Company of Bahia. Stemming from his contract with the Imperial Government of Brazil to provide coal to the ships of the Imperial Navy during the Paraguayan War, Wilson Jr. was known as the "King of Coal" and provided his tugboats for the warships.

Wilson Jr. owned various well-known buildings in Rio, notably the Edifício das Mil Colunas (Building of the Thousand Columns, where, today, the Maritime Court is situated) and Chácara da Floresta on Morro do Castelo. He was the founding president of the International Company of Commerce and Industry and amongst others, was a shipowner, capitalist, warehouse owner, honorary consul of Italy in Pernambuco and Rio and builder of the biggest dry dam on the island of Mocanguê. The main enterprise of his family was the shipping line Wilson & Sons, which he and his brothers, Alexander and James, later ran.

Throughout his career, Wilson Jr. was awarded several honours: Knight of the Order of Saints Maurice and Lazarus (1864), Commander of the Order of the Rose (1867), Commander of the Order of the Immaculate Conception of Vila Viçosa (1875) and Commander of the Order of Christ (1878). In 1891, Carlos I of Portugal created him Conde de Wilson.

In 1894, Wilson Jr. was detained by Floriano Peixoto for his role in the Revolta da Armada and subsequently exiled back to England for a year. He later died in the Hotel das Paineiras in Laranjeiras and was buried in the grounds of his residence, the Palacete dos Leões. He had six children (Eduardo, Alfred, Carlos, Alice, Amélie "Millie" and Stella) by his wife, Felisbella "Yayá" Ernestina Cintra née da Silva.

Titles of nobility
| Preceded by New creation | Conde de Wilson; 1890–1899 | Succeeded by Eduardo Pellew Wilson |
