= Charles Pellew, 7th Viscount Exmouth =

British viscount and chemist

The Viscount Exmouth
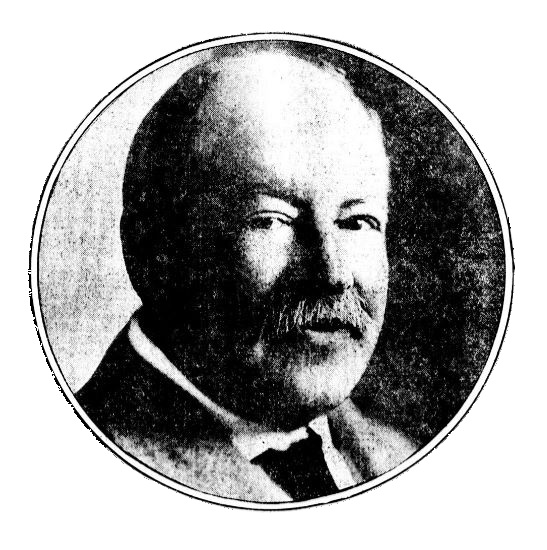
- Charles Ernest Pellew, 1922

Personal details
- Born: Charles Ernest Pellew; 11 March 1863 London, England, United Kingdom
- Died: 7 June 1945 (aged 82) Hindhead, England
- Spouses: Margaret Chandler (m. 1886; died 1922) Mabel Gray (m. 1923)
- Parent(s): Henry Pellew; Eliza Constable Jay

Charles Ernest Pellew, 7th Viscount Exmouth (11 March 1863 – 7 June 1945) was a British peer, chemistry professor and a naturalised United States citizen who inherited the title of Viscount Exmouth at the age of 59 from his father, and held the title for 22 years before his own death. Although born and educated in Britain, he moved to America in 1873 with his father and step-mother. After inheriting his father's title, he moved back to the United Kingdom, where he lived the rest of his life.

== Life and career ==
Charles Pellew was born on 11 March 1863 in London. His father, Henry Pellew, was the grandson of Edward Pellew, 1st Viscount Exmouth, a British admiral who saw action in the American War of Independence and the Napoleonic Wars. Charles was Henry Pellew's second son, his older brother being the writer George Pellew. His mother was Eliza Jay, the daughter of a judge from New York and a descendant of John Jay, the Van Cortlandt family, the Livingston family, and the Schuyler family. His step-mother was Augusta Jay – his mother's sister. The family came to the United States in 1873, and Charles Pellew, being a minor at the time of his father's naturalisation in 1877, then automatically became a United States citizen upon attaining the age of 21. He married Miss Margaret W. Chandler, who was the daughter of Dr. Charles T. Chandler, a Dean of Columbia College, on 29 April 1886 at St Thomas's Church, New York. On 18 February 1892, his older brother, George Pellew, died from a concussion when he fell down a flight of stone stairs while walking in New York City. An inflammation of the eyes had temporarily caused him to be partially blind.

Pellew graduated from the Columbia School of Mines in 1884. From 1886 until 1897, he was a professor at the College of Physicians and Surgeons. His appointment to this post, by his father-in-law, Dr. Charles Chandler, who was the Dean of the College of Mines, was not without some controversy. During the same time period, he became the president of the Berkshire Industrial Farm in Canaan Four Corners, New York, but he resigned this position shortly after being appointed a chemistry professor at Columbia College, where he remained until 1911. His father had previously been president of the farm.

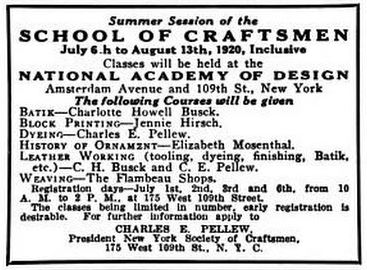
Advertisement for the New York Society of Craftsmen courses during the summer of 1920.

In addition to being a professor at Columbia College, Pellew wrote at least one chemistry book, and he was a frequent public lecturer on many topics including alcoholism, dyes and dyeing of fabrics, and chemistry. He served as the president of the New York Society of Craftsmen at the Art Centre in New York City, and his professional memberships included the American Federation of Arts as well as the American Chemical Society. He was a Fellow of the New York Academy of Sciences. When Dr. Chandler, his father-in-law, resigned as the Chairman of the Chemistry Department at Columbia College, Pellew, along with the rest of the department faculty as a matter of formality, also resigned. Pellew was surprised though when his resignation was accepted. He then became a consulting chemist. Pellew had been consulting on projects for many years. One notable example was his appointment, along with a commission of 16 other men, by the President of the United States, Grover Cleveland, "...to examine and test the fineness and weight of coins..." for the US Mint. These tests, known as the "Annual Trial of Coins," were conducted on 8 February 1888 at Philadelphia, Pennsylvania. They examined coins produced in 1887 from each of the different US Mint branches. All coins were found to be within the tolerances allowed by federal laws.

== Peerage ==
When Henry Pellew, Charles' father, inherited the viscountcy from the fifth Viscount Exmouth on 17 August 1922 at the age of 94, Henry tried to prevent himself from being elevated to the peerage. The British Embassy in Washington informed him that whether or not he ever went to London and sat in the House of Lords, the titles belonged to him. His father also found out that he could not directly pass the titles on to his son Charles.

Because of the advanced age of his father, Charles Pellew was the person who went to Britain to settle the estate of the fifth Viscount Exmouth. His father, Henry Pellew, died on 4 February 1923, less than six months after inheriting the title of Viscount Exmouth. Charles Pellew, being the only surviving son of Henry Pellew, then became the seventh Viscount Exmouth.

Charles Pellew's wife had died of pneumonia less than a year earlier. He married Miss Mabel Gray on 12 May 1923, in the St. Ambrose Chapel of the Cathedral of St. John the Divine in New York City. Upon their marriage she became Mabel, Viscountess Exmouth.

The couple sailed to the United Kingdom on 22 August 1923 so that Pellew could claim his seat in the House of Lords. Upon arriving in Britain, he notified the British authorities that he intended to become a British subject again and take his seat in the Lords. News accounts in 1923 stated it was necessary for him to reside in Britain for five years to become a British subject before he could take his seat with the rest of the Lords; however, it was not until 1931 that he was finally able to sit in that chamber. In April 1931, Pellew finally provided a statement as to why he became a British subject. He stated that before his father's death, he asked, "'. . . me to come to England and be of some service to the family and the country of my birth,' Lord Exmouth said. 'His dying wish was that I spend my life here [in England], and I am doing my best to gratify it.'"

The Honourable Anne Pellew, the only child of Charles and Margaret Pellew, died in Paris, France, on 11 January 1928 while recovering from an operation. Services for her were held at the American Church in Paris on 14 January 1928.

Charles Pellew did not have any children with his second wife. When he died on 7 June 1945 at Hindhead, Surrey, England, he was 82 years old. He was buried in the family vault at St. James's Parish Church (Saint James Churchyard) in Christow, Devon, England. His wife, Mabel, Viscountess Exmouth, died on 28 March 1949, at the age of 77, also at Hindhead.

Upon his death, the title of Viscount Exmouth went to Edward Irving Pownoll Pellew, his 77-year-old cousin, who was living in Pau, France. He became the eighth Viscount Exmouth.

== Military service ==
Pellew served on active duty with the US Army and later with the New York National Guard. On 2 May 1898, Charles Pellew enlisted as a sergeant in Troop A, New York Volunteer Cavalry, and he was mustered into this unit on 20 May 1898. He travelled with this unit to Falls Church, Virginia, where he was discharged on 6 June 1898 to accept appointment as a first lieutenant in the US Army Signal Corps. Pellew was then sent to Tampa, Florida, where he was assigned to the 15th Company, Signal Corps, US Volunteers for duty. One of his duties was to assist in the experiments being made with observation balloons. He was then appointed a captain on 1 August 1898, transferred to Camp Wikoff at Montauk Point, Long Island, New York, and honourably discharged from the service on 10 September 1898. He later served as a member of the New York 12th Infantry during 1915 – 1916.

== Public service ==
Pellew served on the Board of Managers of the Burnham Industrial Farm, later called the Berkshire Industrial Farm, which was an institution devoted to the reformation of boys, eight to sixteen years of age, that tended toward the criminal life. The school provided strict discipline and work to encourage them to lead a more productive life.

Pellew served on the Committee for the Promotion of Agriculture helping to find a location for a new agricultural school in the New York area. The committee chose the Briarcliff Farm, on 67 acres of land, 27 miles from New York near Sing Sing. This later became the School of Practical Agriculture which moved to 415 acres of land near Poughkeepsie, New York. Pellew remained with the new organisation as a trustee.

Pellew served as a founding member and director of the Arts Center, Inc. which brought seven organisations together to promote the arts and make them available to everyone.

Pellew helped organise the Washington (D.C.) Handicraft Guild in May 1921, and he assisted in providing artwork for the Guild's first exhibition in May 1922.

== Publications and Patents ==
=== Books ===
- "Laboratory Schemes in Medical Chemistry" (unknown original publication date and publisher).
- "The History of Alcohol" (unknown original publication date and publisher).
- "Manual of Practical Medical and Physiological Chemistry", D. Appleton and Co., New York, 1892.
- "Question Book to Pellew's Manual of Medical and Physiological Chemistry," James S. Ward, Gospel Advocate Publishing Company, Nashville, Tennessee, 1893.
- "A System of Legal Medicine, Volume I," Allan McLane Hamilton and Lawrence Godkin, E. B. Treat, New York, 1894, Chapter 7: Inorganic Poisons
- "The Crucible, Being a Collection Quantitative & Qualitative of the Songs of the Chemical Society of Columbia University in the City of New York," with W.A. Bradley as co-compiler, New York, 1902.
- "Dyes and Dying", McBride, Nast & Co., New York, 1913.

=== Newspapers and magazine articles ===
- "The History of Alcohol," Appleton's Popular Science Monthly, Part I, June 1897, Pages 231 – 242.
- "The History of Alcohol," Appleton's Popular Science Monthly, Part II, July 1897 Pages 377 – 389.
- Extensively quoted in, "Strange Death of Dickinson, Banker, Revives Stranger Tales of Alchemists," New York Tribune, 29 May 1910, Page 8; also reprinted in other newspapers as "Lure of Alchemy Old As The World Itself."
- "Application of Modern Dyestuffs to Arts and Crafts Work: General Introduction," The Craftsman, Vol. XIV, No. 3, June 1908, Pages 327 – 334.
- "General Description and Classification of Artificial Dyestuffs," The Craftsman, Vol. XIV, No. 4, July 1908, Pages 447 – 450.
- "Equipment Needed for Dyeing and the Colors Formed by Oxidation," The Craftsman, Vol. XIV, No. 5, August 1908, Pages 551 – 554.
- "Indigo and the Vat Colors: Fourth Paper on Dyeing," The Craftsman, Vol. XIV, No. 6, September 1908, Pages 672 -677.
- The Basic Colors," The Craftsman, Vol. XV, No. 1, October 1909, Pages 104 – 106.
- "The Acid Colors," The Craftsman, Vol. XV, No. 2, November 1909, Pages 242 – 245.
- "Dyeing Silks," The Craftsman, Vol. XV, No. 4, January 1909, Pages 489 – 492.
- "Silk Dyeing (Continued)," The Craftsman, Vol. XV, No. 5, February 1909, Pages 614 – 617.
- "Dyeing of Imitation and Artificial Silk," The Craftsman, Vol. XV, No. 6, March 1909, Pages 733 – 736.
- "Modern Dyestuffs Applied to Stenciling," The Craftsman, Vol. XVI, No. 1, April 1909, Pages 114 – 118.
- "Batik, or the Wax Resist Process", The Craftsman, Vol. XVI, No. 2, May 1909, Pages 232 – 235.
- "Tied and Dyed Work: An Oriental Process with American Variations," The Craftsman, Vol. XVI, No. 6, September 1909, Pages 695 – 701.
- Book review of "Identification of the Commercial Dyestuffs" in Science, Vol. XXXII, No. 826, 28 October 1910, Pages 597 – 601.
- "Your Silk Dress Is Half Tin," The Detroit Times, 22 February 1911, Page 11
- Subject of "Notes of Art And Artists," Evening Star, 25 March 1917, Page 14.
- "Cartridges and Chemistry," New York Times, 14 September 1917, Page 8.
- "Perkin's Discovery of Aniline Dyes," Art World, Vol. III, 1 December 1917.
- "Medieval Dyestuffs," Bulletin of the Needle and Bobbin Club, New York, Vol. II, No. 2, June 1918, Pages 3 – 11.
- Indirectly quoted in, "Science and Discovery," Dallas Morning News, 27 July 1919, Part 5, Page 8.
- Indirectly quoted in, "Why Purple Signifies Royalty," Burlington Weekly Free Press, 22 July 1920, Page 11.
- "Artistic Designs in Home Dyeing Attained by a Knot or a Bit of String," New-York Tribune., 7 August 1921, Page 10.
- "Fine Feathers Certainly Help to Make Fine Birds – Especially When Re-Dyed," New-York Tribune., 14 August 1921, Page 10.
- Quoted in, "Your Silk Dress Is Half Tin!," The Tacoma Times, 11 February 1922, Page 4.
- "Futuristic Designs in Home Dyeing Attained By A Knot And A String," New York Tribune, 7 August 1921, Page 10.
- "Fine Feathers Help To Make Fine Birds," New York Tribune, 14 August 1921, Page 10.
- "Dyes and Dying," Journal of Home Economics, June 1923, Page 24.

=== Patents ===
- Chemical Process, No. 884,756, Granted: April 14, 1908
- Stenciling-Ink, No. 911,327, Granted: 2 February 1909

=== Professional papers ===
- "The History of Alcohol," 1907; later published in the "Transactions of the American Brewing Institute, Volume III.

=== Public lectures and speeches ===
All locations are in New York City unless otherwise stated.

- "The History of Poisons," 13 March 1895, given before the Alumni Association of the College of Pharmacy, New York.
- Unknown Topic, 6 December 1896, address to the members of the Williamstown Y.M.C.A. in Williamstown, Massachusetts
- "Alcohol and Alcoholic Beverages," series of free lectures as part of the Cooper Union Courses at the American Museum of Natural History on four consecutive Saturdays commencing on 6 February 1897.
- "Distillation and Distilled Liquors," Museum of Natural History, 20 February 1897.
- "The History of Alcohol," Museum of Natural History, 27 February 1897.
- "Untitled," lecture, 15 April 1899, Cooper Union.
- "Modern Chemistry as Applied to Poisoning", 5 May 1899, Cooper Union.
- Toast to Good Fellowship, 31 March 1906, given before the Fifth Anniversary Dinner of the American Brewing Institute, New York; later published in the "Proceedings of the American Brewing Institute, Volume 3.
- Speech in support of the Judiciary Nominators' ticket, 26 October 1906, Washington Hall (167th St. and Amsterdam Ave.).
- "Artificial Coal Tar Dyes," 4 March 1908, Y.M.C.A. Hall (5 W. 125th St.).
- "The Dyeing of Animal Fibres'," 18 March 1908, Y.M.C.A. Hall.
- "Modern Dyestuffs and Some of Their Applications, The Discovery of the Aniline Colors and Influence of the Discovery Upon the Welfare of the World" 25 January 1909, Havemeyer Hall, Columbia University.
- "Modern Dyestuffs and Some of Their Applications, The Sulphur Colors and How They Can Be Used," 8 February 1909, Havemeyer Hall, Columbia University.
- "Modern Dyestuffs and Some of Their Applications, The Art of Stenciling," 15 February 1909, Havemeyer Hall, Columbia University.
- "Modern Dyestuffs Applied to Ancient Dyeing Process," 20 March 1909, Cooper Union.
- "Batik or Wax Resist Dyeing," 25 March 1909, Pratt Institute.
- "Artificial Coal Tar Dyes," 1 December 1910, St. Luke's Hall (Hudson & Grove Streets).
- "Dying of Cotton Fabrics," 8 December 1910, St. Luke's Hall.
- "The Dyeing of Animal Fibres," 15 December 1910, St. Luke's Hall.
- "The History and Art of Dyeing and the Compounding of Dyestuffs," The Washington Times, 28 April 1915, Handicraft School (1622 H Street NW, Washington, D.C.).
- "The Dyestuffs of the Ancients," at the Metropolitan Museum of Art on four consecutive Saturdays commencing on 5 January 1918.
- "Textiles in the Arts and Crafts," 4 June 1921, Arts Club, Washington, D.C.
- "Modern Dyestuffs and Ancient Processes of Dying," 17 May 1922, Washington (D.C.) Art Center

=== Songs ===
- "Columbia's Y. M. C. A.," printed in the book Columbia Songs

== Arms ==
Coat of arms of Charles Pellew, 7th Viscount Exmouth
Crest Upon the waves of the sea the wreck of the Dutton East Indianman upon a rocky shore off Plymouth garrison all Proper. Escutcheon Gules a lion passant guardant in chief two chaplets of laurel Or on a chief of augmentation wavy a representation of Algiers with a British Man-of-War before it all Proper. Supporters Dexter a lion rampant guardant Or navally crowned Azure resting the dexter paw upon a decrescent Argent, sinister a male figure representing slavery trowsers Argent striped Azure the upper part of the body naked holding in the dexter hand broken chains Proper the sinister arm elevated and holding a cross Or. Motto Deo Adjuvante (over the crest), Algiers (under the shield)

Peerage of the United Kingdom
Preceded by Henry Pellew	Viscount Exmouth; 1923–1945	Succeeded by Edward Pellew
