= Edward Pellew, 5th Viscount Exmouth =

The Viscount Exmouth

Personal details
- Born: Edward Addington Hargreaves Pellew; 12 November 1890 Newton Abbot, Devon, England
- Died: 17 August 1922 (aged 31) Marylebone, London County, England
- Parent(s): Edward Pellew, 4th Viscount Exmouth; Edith Hargreaves
- Education: Trinity College, Cambridge; Eton College

Edward Addington Hargreaves Pellew, 5th Viscount Exmouth (12 November 1890 – 17 August 1922), was a British peer who inherited the title of Viscount Exmouth at the age of eight years old from his father, and held the title for 22 years before his own death.

== Life ==
Edward Pellew was born on 12 November 1890 in Newton Abbot, Devon, England. His parents were Edward Pellew, 4th Viscount Exmouth, and Edith Hargreaves, the daughter of Thomas Hargeaves, Esq., a Justice of the Peace. In 1903 Pellew entered the Royal Navy at the age of thirteen, then went to Eton College in autumn 1905, and continued his education at Trinity College, Cambridge. In January 1911 he travelled to the United States where he spent at least a month visiting relatives including his aunt, Mrs. Sophia Jackson. He visited the United States at least once more in 1913 when he went to both Philadelphia and Washington, D.C.

After college he entered the British Army joining the 7th Service Battalion of Princess Charlotte of Wales's (Royal Berkshire Regiment). On 25 January 1915, he gained his pilot's certification on a Maurice Farman biplane at Shoreham Airport (now named Brighton City Airport). He spent the rest of the First World War in the Royal Flying Corps, later Royal Air Force but he ultimately had to give up his Air Force career in 1918 because of ulcerative colitis. He never regained his health and died on 17 August 1922 at Marylebone, London County, England, after an unsuccessful operation for surgery to his bowel: The official cause of death was carcinoma of the colon.

During his lifetime Pellew saved all of his regimental pay, and upon his death the accumulated savings were donated "... to the Prince of Wales National Relief Fund declaring that he did not wish to reap any pecuniary benefit for his services to his country during wartime." Nearly the entire remainder of his estate passed to his cousin Dr. Edward Irving Pellew, of Pau, France, who became the 8th Viscount Exmouth in 1945.

Pellew was succeeded in his titles by his first cousin twice removed, Henry Pellew, who was living in the United States.

== Arms ==
Coat of arms of Edward Pellew, 5th Viscount Exmouth
Crest Upon the waves of the sea the wreck of the Dutton East Indianman upon a rocky shore off Plymouth garrison all Proper. Escutcheon Gules a lion passant guardant in chief two chaplets of laurel Or on a chief of augmentation wavy a representation of Algiers with a British Man-of-War before it all Proper. Supporters Dexter a lion rampant guardant Or navally crowned Azure resting the dexter paw upon a decrescent Argent, sinister a male figure representing slavery trowsers Argent striped Azure the upper part of the body naked holding in the dexter hand broken chains Proper the sinister arm elevated and holding a cross Or. Motto Deo Adjuvante (over the crest), Algiers (under the shield)

Peerage of the United Kingdom
Preceded by Edward Pellew	Viscount Exmouth; 1899–1922	Succeeded by Henry Pellew
