= Henry Pellew, 6th Viscount Exmouth =

The Right Honourable The Viscount Exmouth
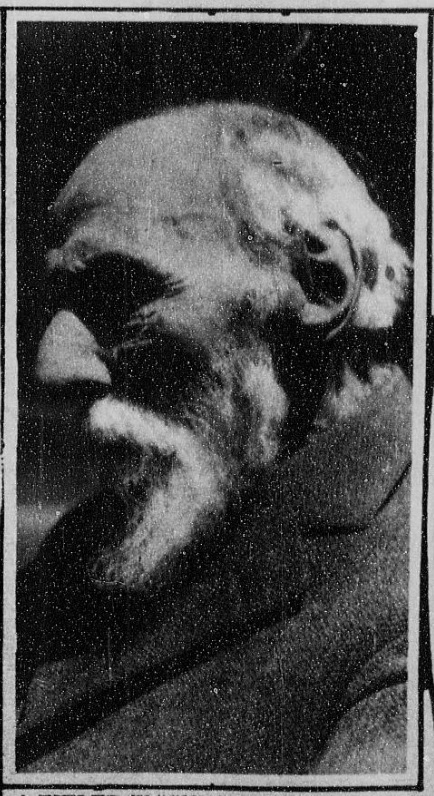
- Henry Edward Pellew, 1922

Personal details
- Born: Henry Edward Pellew; 26 April 1828 Canterbury, Kent, United Kingdom
- Died: 4 February 1923 (aged 94) Washington, D.C., U.S.
- Resting place: Oak Hill Cemetery; Washington, D.C., U.S.
- Spouses: Eliza Constable Jay (1858–1869) Augusta Jay (after 1873)
- Relations: Edward Pellew, 1st Viscount Exmouth (grandfather); Henry Addington, 1st Viscount Sidmouth (grandfather)
- Children: 4, including Charles
- Parent(s): George Pellew; Frances Addington
- Education: Trinity College, Cambridge; Eton College

Henry Edward Pellew, 6th Viscount Exmouth (26 April 1828 – 4 February 1923) was a British peer and a naturalised United States citizen who inherited the title of Viscount Exmouth at the age of 94 from a cousin, and held the title for less than a year before his own death. Although born and educated in Britain, he moved to America in 1873 shortly after his second marriage and lived there for the rest of his life, carrying out charitable works.

== Early life ==
Pellew was born on 26 April 1828 in Canterbury, Kent. His father, George Pellew, who was Dean of Norwich, was the third son of Edward Pellew, 1st Viscount Exmouth, a British admiral who saw action in the American War of Independence and the Napoleonic Wars. Henry was his only son. His mother was Frances Addington, a daughter of Viscount Sidmouth.

Pellew was educated at Eton College, before studying at Trinity College, Cambridge, obtaining a Bachelor of Arts degree in 1850. Whilst at Cambridge University, he won his "Blue" by rowing for the University Boat Club against Oxford in the Boat Race in 1849.

== Career ==
He was one of the founders of Keble College, Oxford and served on the Council of the college from its foundation in 1870 until 1873. He was also a magistrate for the county of Middlesex, serving on the boards of various charities, hospitals and schools in and around London.

Pellew carried on working for various good causes in America, as he had in Britain, even after his ninetieth birthday. He helped to organise the Bureau of Charities in New York, working with the future President Theodore Roosevelt. He helped to set up coffee houses for poor people, a free lending library, and night shelters, as well as helping improve housing conditions. He was President of the Association for Improving the Condition of the Poor and of the St George Society, a British-American group in New York; he also belonged to the Society for Sanitary Reform and the School Commission. He helped with the plans for Washington National Cathedral.

=== Peerage ===
In August 1922, Edward Pellew, 5th Viscount Exmouth, a distant cousin, died without descendants and his titles (Viscount Exmouth and two other titles earlier created for the 1st Viscount, namely Baron Exmouth and a baronetcy) passed to Pellew as the closest male relative. He attempted to renounce the peerage (the U.S. Constitution prohibits any "person holding any office of profit or trust under them" from "without the consent of the Congress, accept[ing] any . . . title, of any kind whatever, from any king, prince, or foreign state.") in favour of his son Charles Pellew, but was told by the British Embassy in Washington that this was not possible. In any event, he preferred to remain known as "Mr Henry Edward Pellew" rather than use the title of Viscount.

== Personal life ==
On 5 October 1858 Pellew married Eliza Constable Jay in Bedford, New York. Eliza was the daughter of Judge William Jay and Hannah Augusta (née McVickar) Jay from New York and a granddaughter of John Jay. She was a descendant of the Van Cortlandt, Livingston, and Schuyler families. They had three children:

- William Henry Edward George Pellew (1859–1892), who died "suddenly, from an accident", unmarried in New York City.
- Charles Pellew, 7th Viscount Exmouth (1863–1945), a professor of chemistry at Columbia University; he married Margaret Walton Chandler, the only daughter of Dr. Charles T. Chandler, in 1896. After her death in 1922, he married Mabel Gray, a daughter of Richard Gray of San Francisco and Queen's County, Ireland, in 1923.
- Violet Lisa Mary Pellew (1869–1870), who died in infancy.

His first wife died in England in 1869 and, on 14 May 1873, he married her youngest sister, Augusta Jay, in Vienna. The marriage was not recognised as valid at that time in English law. In the same year (possibly because of this, suggested his obituary in The Times) he moved to New York City, and later to Washington, D.C. He became a naturalised citizen of the United States on 25 September 1877. One daughter was born to this marriage:

- The Hon. Marion Jay Pellew (1878–1954).

He died in Washington on 4 February 1923, funeral services were held at St. John's Church on 7 February 1923, and he was buried at Oak Hill Cemetery in Washington, D.C. A memorial plaque was erected in St. James Church in Christow, Devon. It states in part, "Kind, wise, and generous, he never forgot his duty to his neighbour, and wherever he lived, he made the community happier and better for his presence and his influence."

He was succeeded in his titles by his son, Charles Pellew.

== Arms ==
Coat of arms of Henry Pellew, 6th Viscount Exmouth
Crest Upon the waves of the sea the wreck of the Dutton East Indianman upon a rocky shore off Plymouth garrison all Proper. Escutcheon Gules a lion passant guardant in chief two chaplets of laurel Or on a chief of augmentation wavy a representation of Algiers with a British Man-of-War before it all Proper. Supporters Dexter a lion rampant guardant Or navally crowned Azure resting the dexter paw upon a decrescent Argent, sinister a male figure representing slavery trowsers Argent striped Azure the upper part of the body naked holding in the dexter hand broken chains Proper the sinister arm elevated and holding a cross Or. Motto Deo Adjuvante (over the crest), Algiers (under the shield)

Peerage of the United Kingdom
Preceded by Edward Pellew	Viscount Exmouth; 1922–1923	Succeeded by Charles Pellew
