= Edward Pellew, 3rd Viscount Exmouth =

Edward Pellew, 3rd Viscount Exmouth (14 February 1811 – 11 February 1876), was a British peer who inherited the title of Viscount Exmouth from his father and held the title for 42 years. He was the grandson of Edward Pellew, 1st Viscount Exmouth.

Edward Pellew was born on 14 February 1811, the eldest son of Pownoll Pellew, 2nd Viscount Exmouth, and Eliza Harriet Barlow. His father died less than 11 months after inheriting the viscountcy and barony, and Edward acceded to the titles in December 1833. During his lifetime he continued to receive the £2,000 annual pension that had been awarded to the holder of the title of Viscount Exmouth that was first awarded to his grandfather (approximately equal to $228,000 in 2016).

He married Madeline Honorine Dobrowolska of Paris, France (died 22 January 1870), on 8 July 1858 at St. Marylebone Parish Church, Middlesex, England. Her father was Louis Stanislas Dobrowolski.

Edward Pellew died 11 February 1876 in Kensington, London, England. Because he had no children, he was succeeded in his titles by his nephew Edward Fleetwood John Pellew, 4th Viscount Exmouth, the son of Hon. Fleetwood John Pellew, fourth son of the second Viscount Exmouth.

== Arms ==
Coat of arms of Edward Pellew, 3rd Viscount Exmouth
Crest Upon the waves of the sea the wreck of the Dutton East Indianman upon a rocky shore off Plymouth garrison all Proper. Escutcheon Gules a lion passant guardant in chief two chaplets of laurel Or on a chief of augmentation wavy a representation of Algiers with a British Man-of-War before it all Proper. Supporters Dexter a lion rampant guardant Or navally crowned Azure resting the dexter paw upon a decrescent Argent, sinister a male figure representing slavery trowsers Argent striped Azure the upper part of the body naked holding in the dexter hand broken chains Proper the sinister arm elevated and holding a cross Or. Motto Deo Adjuvante (over the crest), Algiers (under the shield)

Peerage of the United Kingdom
Preceded by Pownoll Pellew	Viscount Exmouth; 1833–1876	Succeeded by Edward Pellew
