= Pownoll Pellew, 2nd Viscount Exmouth =

British politician (1786–1833)

Captain The Right Honourable The Viscount Exmouth
- Born: 1 July 1786; Cornwall, England
- Died: 3 December 1833 (aged 47); London, England
- Spouses: Eliza Harriet Barlow (m. 1808; div. 1820) Georgina Janet Dick (m. 1822)

Captain Pownoll Bastard Pellew, 2nd Viscount Exmouth (1 July 1786 – 3 December 1833) was a Royal Navy officer and politician who represented Launceston in the House of Commons of the United Kingdom from 1812 to 1830.

== Life ==
He was the eldest son of Edward Pellew, 1st Viscount Exmouth, and his wife Susan Pellew (nee Frowde). Pownoll's middle name commemorated his godfather, the MP Edmund Bastard. Like his father, and his younger brother Fleetwood Pellew, he served in the Royal Navy and attained the rank of Post Captain in 1806. He did not achieve great success in the Navy despite the influence of his father.

Pellew first served as a midshipman in 1798 under his father, Edward Pellew, in the 74-gun ship of the line Impétueux. He was described at this time by his father as "clever and quick, but idle and unmanageable." This was just after the Spithead and Nore mutinies and the ship's company was still restive. A mutiny was put down and the participants were court martialled and hanged at the yard arm or flogged round the fleet in Port Mahon.

Pellew was made a lieutenant well before he had served the mandatory seven years at sea, as his father had considerable influence with the authorities. Favours in parliament ensured Pownoll's promotion to commander at the age of seventeen. His first command was the 18-gun Fly in the West Indies under Admiral Dacres. Fly was lost on a reef in 1805, though the crew were saved. Pellew underwent the mandatory court martial for the loss of his ship and was found not guilty of negligence. He rejoined his father, now at Madras. Admiral Pellew was by this time Commander in Chief of the Navy in the East Indies. Pownoll was immediately made acting-captain of the frigate Sir Francis Drake, and was given Terpsichore upon his father promoting him to post-rank in 1806.

Both father and son were becoming wealthy with the prize money to be won in the East Indies. After his first marriage in 1808, Pellew returned to England and started building the new family seat of Canonteign in Devon. He did not stay in the Navy but became involved in politics, serving as Member of Parliament for Launceston from 1812 to 1830. His father's friendship with the Duke of Northumberland was important in his gaining the seat.

His father became Lord Exmouth in 1814 and Viscount Exmouth in 1816. When he died in January 1833, Pownoll became the second Viscount Exmouth, a title he enjoyed for just eleven months. He died at age 47 and was succeeded by his eldest son Edward Pellew.

He is buried in Christow church with a monument by Thomas Gaffin.

== Marriages and children ==
Pellew's Divorce Act 1820
- Act of Parliament
- Parliament of the United Kingdom
- Long title: An Act for dissolving the Marriage of Pownoll Bastard Pellew, Esquire, commonly called the Honourable Bastard Pellew, eldest son and heir apparent of the Right Honourable Edward Lord Viscount Exmouth, with Eliza Harriet Pellew, his now wife, and to enable him to marry again, and for other purposes therein mentioned.
- Citation: 1 Geo. 4. c. 66

Dates
- Royal assent: 24 July 1820

On 1 October 1808, he married Eliza Harriet Barlow, eldest daughter of Sir George Barlow, 1st Baronet, the Governor of Madras, but they were divorced by an act of Parliament, Pellew's Divorce Act 1820 (1 Geo. 4. c. 66). She was born in 1789 and died in 1833. They had two sons and one daughter. These children were:

- Edward Pellew (14 February 1811 – 11 February 1876); he would become the 3rd Viscount Exmouth.
- Percy Taylor Pellew (15 April 1814 – 31 December 1848); officer in Madras Cavalry.
- Juliana Sarah Pellew (16 June 1816 – 31 August 1891)

On 15 April 1822, he married Georgina Janet Dick, eldest daughter of Mungo Dick, Esq. She was born circa 1800 and died 15 February 1870. They had three sons and two daughters:

- Pownoll Fleetwood Pellew (26 July 1823 – 25 December 1851); lieutenant in the Royal Navy.
- Caroline Emma Pellew (24 February 1825 – 2 March 1832)
- a daughter (September 1827; died in infancy)
- Fleetwood John Pellew (6 November 1830 – 2 August 1866), father of the 4th Viscount.
- Barrington Reynolds Pellew (18 April 1833 – 6 December 1858); major in the 2nd Battalion, Rifle Brigade.

== Arms ==
Coat of arms of Pownoll Pellew, 2nd Viscount Exmouth
Crest Upon the waves of the sea the wreck of the Dutton East Indianman upon a rocky shore off Plymouth garrison all Proper. Escutcheon Gules a lion passant guardant in chief two chaplets of laurel Or on a chief of augmentation wavy a representation of Algiers with a British Man-of-War before it all Proper. Supporters Dexter a lion rampant guardant Or navally crowned Azure resting the dexter paw upon a decrescent Argent, sinister a male figure representing slavery trowsers Argent striped Azure the upper part of the body naked holding in the dexter hand broken chains Proper the sinister arm elevated and holding a cross Or. Motto Deo Adjuvante (over the crest), Algiers (under the shield)

Parliament of the United Kingdom
Preceded by Jonathan Raine; James Brogden	Member of Parliament for Launceston; 1812–1830; With: James Brogden	Succeeded by Sir James Gordon; James Brogden
Peerage of the United Kingdom
Preceded by Edward Pellew	Viscount Exmouth; 1833	Succeeded by Edward Pellew
