= Robert Laurie =

Robert Laurie may refer to:

== People ==
- Robert Laurie (bishop) (died 1677), Scottish prelate, Bishop of Brechin
- Robert Laurie (engraver) (c. 1755–1836), British mezzotint engraver and publisher
- Robert Laurie (rugby league) (1955–2022), Australian sportsman
- Robert Peter Laurie (1835–1905), Member of Parliament for Canterbury (1879–1880) and Bath (1886–1892)
- Sir Robert Laurie, 4th Baronet (1708–1779), Member of Parliament for Dumfries Burghs
- Sir Robert Laurie, 5th Baronet (c. 1738–1804), Member of Parliament for Dumfriesshire
- Sir Robert Laurie, 6th Baronet (1764–1848), admiral in the Royal Navy
- Robert Douglas Laurie (1874–1953), founder and first president of the Association of University Teachers
- Robert Laurie (journalist), or Bobby Laurie, American travel expert

== Fictional characters ==
- Robert Laurie, a character in the 1927 film Annie Laurie
