= John Bayly =

John Bayly may refer to:

- John Bayly (priest, died 1633), guardian of Christ's Hospital, Ruthin, and chaplain to Charles I
- John Bayly (priest, died 1831), Dean of Lismore
- John Percy Bayly (1882–1963), Fijian businessman, politician and philanthropist

== See also ==
- John Bayley (disambiguation)
- John Bailey (disambiguation)
- John Baily (disambiguation)
