= Bayley baronets of Updown House (1834) =

Bayley baronets (later Laurie baronets)
- Escutcheon of the Bayley baronets of Updown House
- Creation date: 1834
- Status: extant
- Former seat(s): Updown House, Kent
- Motto: Officio egere nolo, I do not wish to fail in my duty

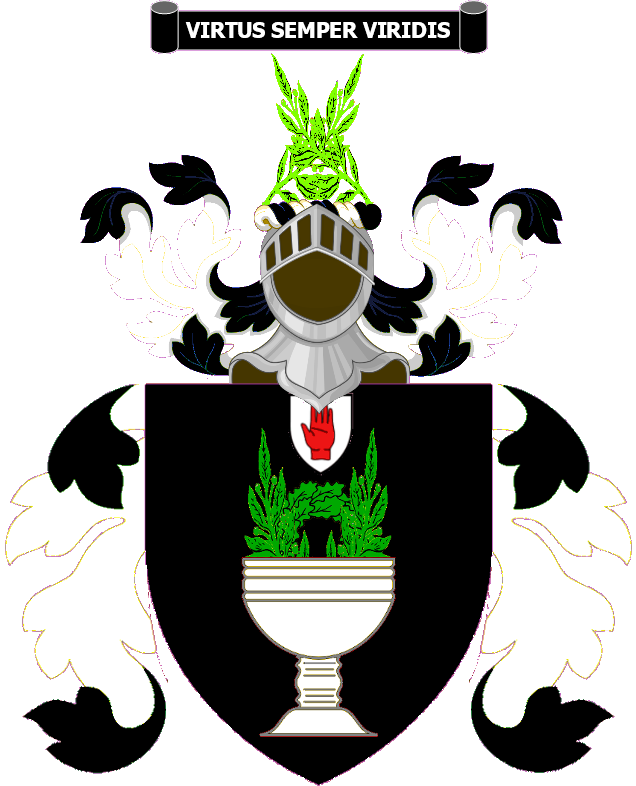
Coat of arms of the Laurie baronets of Bedford Square

The Bayley baronets of Updown House in the County of Kent, later Laurie baronetcy of Bedford Square in the County of Middlesex, was created in the Baronetage of the United Kingdom on 15 March 1834 for John Bayley, a Judge of the Queen's Bench, Baron of the Exchequer and legal writer.

The 3rd Baronet assumed by Royal licence the surname of Laurie of Maxwelton in lieu of his patronymic in 1886. The 4th Baronet was a Lieutenant-colonel in the King's Own Scottish Borderers and fought in the Second Boer War. The 6th Baronet was a Major-General and commanded the Seaforth Highlanders.

== Bayley, later Laurie baronets, of Bedford Square (1834) ==
- Sir John Bayley, 1st Baronet (1763–1841)
- Sir John Edward George Bayley, 2nd Baronet (1793–1871)
- Sir John Robert Laurie Emilius Laurie, 3rd Baronet (1823–1917)
- Sir Claude Villiers Emilius Laurie, 4th Baronet (1855–1930)
- Sir Wilfrid Emilius Laurie, 5th Baronet (1859–1936)
- Sir John Emilius Laurie, 6th Baronet (1892–1983)
- Sir Robert Bayley Emilius Laurie, 7th Baronet (1931–2017)
- Sir Andrew Ronald Emilius Laurie, 8th Baronet (1944–2021)
- Sir John Christopher Emilius Laurie, 9th Baronet (born 1971).

The heir presumptive is the current holder's brother Michael James Edward Laurie (born 1973).

== Notes ==
Baronetage of the United Kingdom
Preceded by Russell baronets	Bayley baronets of Updown House; 15 March 1834	Succeeded by Tierney baronets
