= John Bayley =

John Bayley may refer to:

- John Bayley (died 1611), MP for Salisbury
- John Bayley (antiquary) (1787–1869), English antiquary
- Sir John Bayley, 1st Baronet (1763–1841), Justice of the King's Bench
- Sir John Bayley, 2nd Baronet (1793–1871), British baronet and cricketer 1817–1832
- John Bayley (cricketer) (1794–1874), English cricketer 1822–1850
- John Bayley (musician) (1847–1910), English bandmaster, clarinetist, violinist, and organist
- John Bayley (writer) (1925–2015), British literary critic and writer
- John Arthur Bayley (1831–1903), British Army officer

== See also ==
- John Bayly (disambiguation)
- John Bailey (disambiguation)
- John Baillie (disambiguation)
- John Baily (disambiguation)
