= Keelmen =

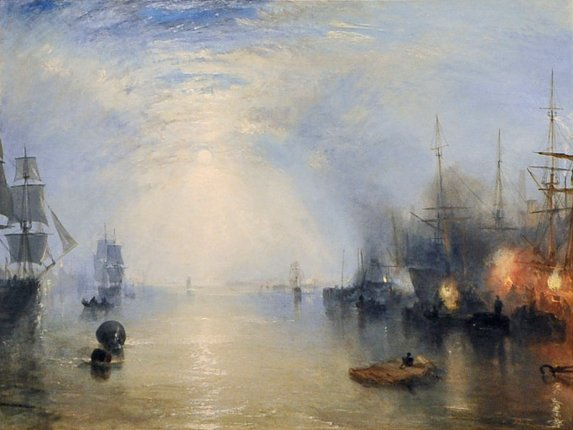
J. M. W. Turner´s, Keelmen Heaving in Coals by Moonlight, 1835

In British history, Keelmen were men who worked aboard keels (see below) ferrying coal along the rivers Tyne, Blyth and Wear to collier ships moored in deeper parts of the rivers or offshore. Keels were large barge-like vessels or lighters which were needed because the shallowness of the rivers barred access to larger vessels. The keelmen formed a close-knit and colourful community until their eventual demise late in the nineteenth century.

== Beginnings of the coal trade ==
Coal began to be exported from the River Tyne from the mid-thirteenth century onwards. The first recorded shipment of coal from the River Wear was in 1396. The pits from which coal was then exported were near the riverside so that as little effort as possible was required to load it. The coal was carried to London and elsewhere in colliers; small wooden sailing ships that sailed down the east coast. At this time neither the Tyne nor the Wear were easily navigable for ships of significant draught. The mouth of the Tyne was obstructed by Herd Sands, Bellehues Rock and a bar that ran across the mouth of the river. Further up river a ship might run aground in various shallows and the stone bridge at Newcastle prevented colliers from reaching coal deposits further up river. The rivers were very shallow near the banks, which made the approach difficult, so coal was loaded into shallow-draught keels for transport down river.

== The keels ==
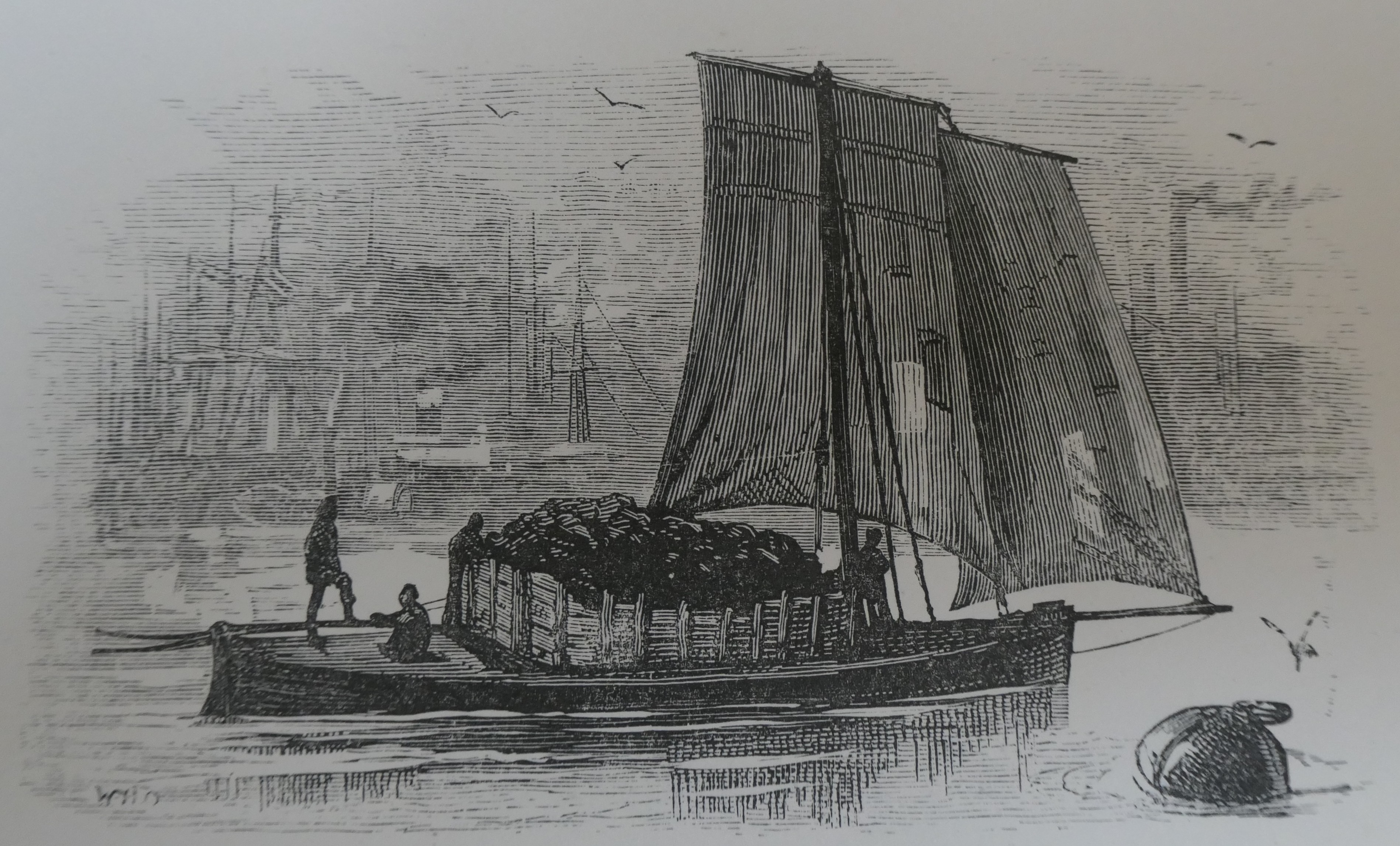
A "keel of the old type", pictured in Northumberland, 1882

The keels were wooden boats with a pointed stern, so that the bow and stern looked almost the same. They were of shallow draught so that when fully loaded they drew only 4.5 ft (1.4 m). The keels were 40 ft (12 m) long and at least 19 ft (5.8 m) wide amidships: a very broad configuration. They were carvel-built (smooth sided) and generally of oak, often with elm used below the waterline. In 1266 the standard load of a keel was set at 20 chaldrons (wagonloads) or approximately 17 tons. After 1497 the keel load was frequently increased, until in 1635 it was set at 21.1 tons. A chaldron was a horse-drawn wagon containing 17 long cwt (860 kg) of coal. Keels were supposed to be measured by the Kings Commissioners and given a load mark to show when they were full.

Early keels were propelled with a large oar, handled by all the crew except the skipper; they had no rudder and were steered by a second oar or "swape" over the stern. The crew worked with the flow of the river tides where practicable. Later the oars were supplemented by a mast with a square sail attached to a yard, and latterly with a large spritsail and staysail, though the oars were still used to row when the wind was not favourable. There were also two eighteen-foot, iron-shod poles ("puoys") for polling the keel through any shallows. The floor of the hold was only 2 ft (60 cm) below the gunwale to allow for easy loading. The coal was piled high above the top of the hold with wooden boards used to prevent the cargo from sliding. Each keel was manned by a skipper, two crewmen and a boy, known as a 'pee dee' 'P. D.' or 'paydee'. While it has been stated that the meaning of this title is unknown, it might have developed from an earlier use of 'peedee' meaning "footboy", or "groom", from Latin pede, "on foot". As the railways started to take away the keelmen's trade, most skippers discontinued the employment of a boy to save on their salary. The two crewmen were invariably called the 'bullies' ("bully" here meaning "brother", "comrade"). Many keels had a small after-cabin or "huddick", fitted with a stove, where the crew could sleep.

== Work and conditions ==
Keelmen loaded coal into the keel's hold from a "spout" or riverside chute. The keel would then be taken down river on the ebb tide using oars, or sail if the wind was favourable, and taken alongside the waiting collier where the crew would shovel the coal into the collier, working even after darkness. This could be arduous due to the difference in height between the keel's gunwale and the collier's deck. When keelmen struck in 1819 one of their demands was an extra shilling per keel per foot that the side of the collier exceeded 5 ft (1.5 m). After a time colliers were constructed in such a manner as to make it easier to load coal into them. After loading the keelmen would return for another load if there was daytime left and tides allowed. They were paid by the "tide"; i.e. by each trip between the ship and the staith, irrespective of distance. By the mid 19th century the usual fee was one guinea, including loading, which the keel's owner would split amongst the three crew in nearly equal shares, retaining only around 8d. per tide over and above the other shares. Before the railways began to harm the trade, a keel owner would expect to make around ten "tides" a week.

Keelmen were traditionally bound to employment for a year, the binding day normally being Christmas Day but employment tended to be seasonal with hardly any work in winter. The availability of work was often affected by the weather, if ships were unable to come into the river, and also by the supply of coal from the pits. Strikes might affect output and wily pit owners would sometimes curtail production to keep prices high. As a result, keelmen could spend long periods without work, during which they would have to live on credit or find employment in clearing wrecks and sand banks from the river. The Tyneside keelmen formed an independent society in 1556 but were never incorporated, probably because the Newcastle Hostmen feared their becoming too powerful. The Wearside keelmen were finally incorporated by Act of Parliament in 1792.

The Tyneside keelmen lived in the Sandgate area, outside the city walls, one of the poorest and most overcrowded parts of the city, made up of many narrow alleys. John Baillie, writing in the late 18th century, said that they "live[d] almost entirely upon flesh-meat and flour, of the best kinds, which their strong exertions in their employment require." They were known by some as a close-knit group of aggressive, hard-drinking men: John Wesley, after visiting Newcastle, described them as much given to drunkenness and swearing. Baillie said that this reputation was entirely undeserved: the keelmen had a "rough" way of expressing themselves, and were loud and vociferous "from the practice of hailing one another on the river, especially in the night tides", but "they scorn to show what they think incivility or rudeness to any person". Despite this, in the mid 19th century they were described as "a proverbially unintelligent, ignorant and intemperate set of men. One keelman, it used to be said, could drink out three pitmen".

For their Sunday best clothing the keelmen often wore a distinctive blue coat or short blue jacket: this was accompanied by a flat-brimmed black hat, yellow waistcoat and white shirt, and legwear described as either slate-grey trousers or blue stockings and flannel breeches. In the 18th century keelmen were identifiable by the blue bonnet many of them wore at work, later replaced by a sou'wester. In the 1840s they were described as wearing "a peculiar costume, consisting of a large jacket, or rather doublet, with loose breeches, made very wide at the knee, and not descending further". The trade of keelmen tended to be passed on from father to son, the son working as an apprentice on a keel until considered old enough and strong enough to be a crewman. Most men were unfit to continue the physically very demanding work into their forties. By 1700 there were 1,600 keelmen working on the Tyne in 400 keels. Not all were local: there was a significant number of Scottish keelmen who returned home in the winter when trade was slack.

== Disputes with the Hostmen ==
The Tyneside keelmen were employed by the Newcastle Hostmen and were often in dispute with their employers. They went on strike in 1709, 1710, 1740 and 1750. One grievance held by the keelmen was that the Hostmen, in order to avoid custom duties, would deliberately overload the keels. Duty was paid on each keel-load, so that it paid the owner to load as much coal as possible. This meant that the keel-load gradually increased from 16 tons in 1600 to 21.25 tons in 1695. As the keelmen were paid by the keel-load, they had to work considerably harder for the same pay. Even after the keel-load had been standardised, there were cases of keel owners illegally enlarging the holds to carry more coal, as much as 26.5 tons. In 1719 and 1744, the Tyneside keelmen went on strike in protest at this 'overmeasure'. The 1750 strike was also against 'overmeasure', as well as against 'can-money', the practice of paying part of the keelmen's wages in drink that had to be consumed at 'can-houses', pubs owned by the employers. The 1750 strike also contained a late Jacobite proclamation, said to have been encouraged by an Edinburgh lawyer.

== Expansion of the Wear coal trade ==
The coal export trade from the Wear was slow to develop, but by the seventeenth century there was a thriving trade in exporting coal from the Durham coalfield via the River Wear. The tonnage however was much smaller than on the Tyne; in 1609, 11,648 tons were exported from the Wear compared with 239,000 tons exported from the Tyne. This imbalance changed dramatically during the English Civil War because of the Parliamentarian blockade of the Tyne and their encouragement of the Wearside merchants to make up for the subsequent shortfall in coal for London. Coal exports from the Wear increased by an enormous amount, causing a similar increase in the number of keelmen employed on the river. By time of the Restoration in 1660, trade on the Tyne had recovered, but the river was now only exporting a third more coal than the Wear.

== The Keelmen's Hospital ==
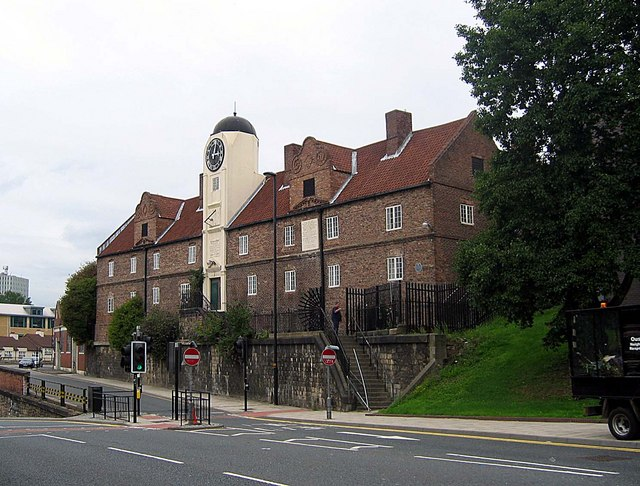
The Keelmen's Hospital in Newcastle upon tyne

In 1699 the keelmen of Newcastle decided to build the Keelmen's Hospital, a charitable foundation for sick and aged keelmen and their families. The keelmen agreed to contribute one penny a tide from the wages of each keel's crew and Newcastle Corporation made land available in Sandgate. The hospital was completed in 1701 at a cost of £2,000. It consisted of fifty chambers giving onto a cloister enclosing a grass court. One matter of contention relating to the hospital was that the funds for its maintenance were kept in the control of the Hostmen, lest they be used as a strike fund by the keelmen. The hospital building remains in City Road, Newcastle, and was used for student accommodation until the early 21st century.

The building was placed on the Heritage at Risk register in 2009. It stood vacant since the closure of the student accommodation. In 2026, after receipt of a £4.6m grant from the National Lottery, the city council announced plans to convert the building into 20 affordable housing units. The hospital is a Grade II* listed building.

== Impressment in the Royal Navy ==
Because of their experience of handling boats, the keelmen were considered useful in times of war when the Royal Navy required seamen for its warships. During the French Revolutionary Wars, the Naval Impress Service would have liked to impress as many keelmen as possible, but the keelmen were officially protected from impressment. However, in 1803, during a time of crisis, the Tyne Regulating Officer captured 53 keelmen with the intention of impressing them into the navy despite their exemption. In retaliation, their wives took up whatever was handy (shovels, pans, rolling pins) and marched to North Shields intent on using any means to rescue their men, whilst the rest of the keelmen went on strike until the captured men were released. A compromise was reached so that 80 ‘volunteers’ (one in ten keelmen) would be accepted into the navy and the rest would be exempted from impressment. A levy was to be paid by the coal-owners and keelmen to provide a bounty for the keelmen who joined the navy. A similar situation existed on the Wear, except that the keelmen there were treated less generously. They had to provide a similar quota of recruits with two landsmen counting as one prime sailor.

== Coal staiths ==
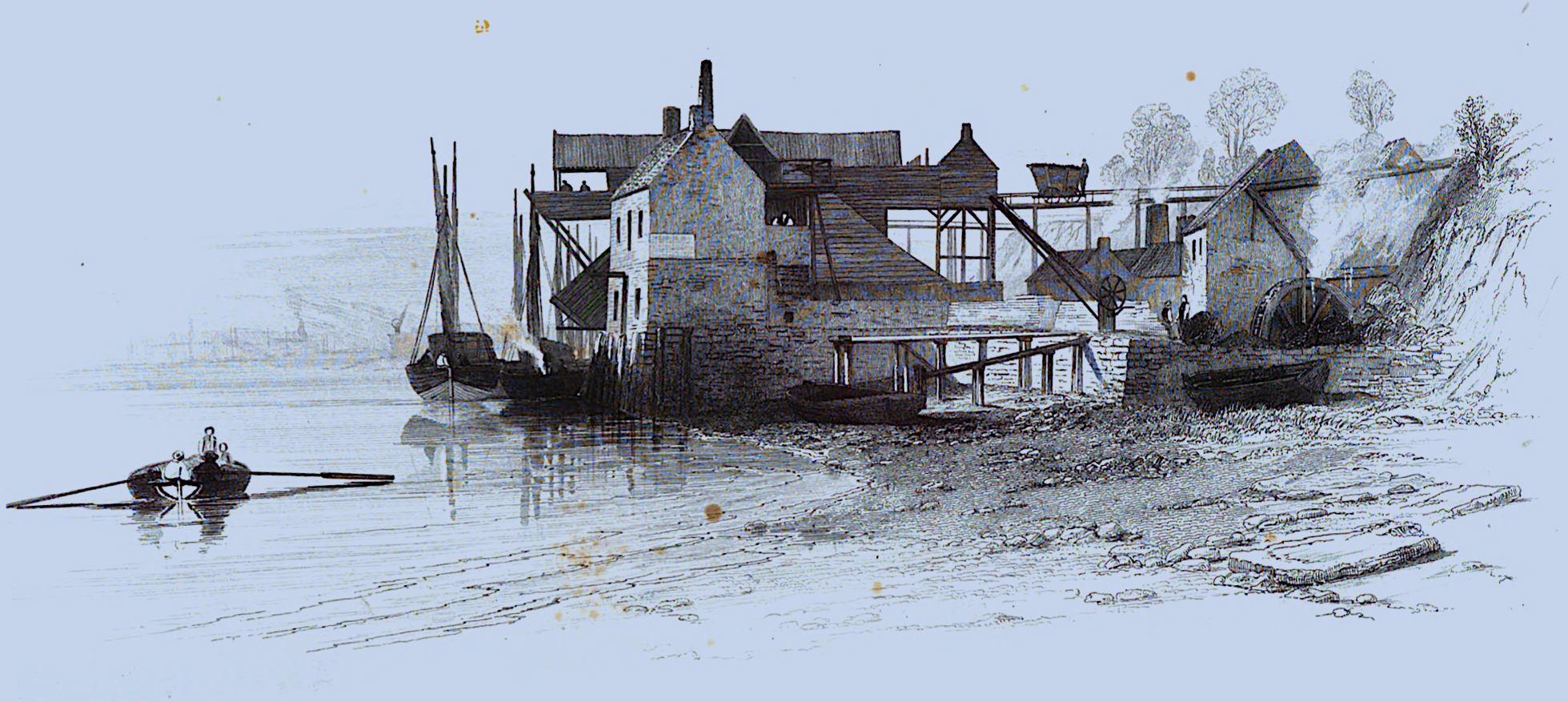
The staith at Benwell colliery, near Newcastle, 1844

About 1750 a new development began to be used on the Tyne. New pits were being sunk further and further away from the river and coal was being brought to the riverbank via wagon ways. Once there, in places accessible by colliers, coal staiths were built to allow coal to be dropped directly into the holds of the colliers without the need for keels.

Staiths were short piers that projected out over the river and allowed coal wagons to run on rails to the end. Colliers would moor alongside the end of the staiths and, initially, the coal from the wagons was emptied down chutes into the colliers’ holds. Later, to avoid breakage of the coal, the coal wagons were lowered onto the decks of the colliers and were unloaded there. This was the beginning of the end for the keelmen and they realised the threat that the coal staiths posed. Strikes and riots resulted whenever new staiths were opened. In 1794 the Tyneside keelmen went on strike against the use of staiths for loading coal.

Because of the shallowness of the Tyne, the use of coal staiths did not entirely eliminate the need for keels. The amount that the staiths projected into the river was limited so as not to obstruct river traffic, so that the staiths ended in shallow water. As colliers were loaded their draught would deepen until often they were no longer able to continue loading from the staiths. In such cases the colliers would have to move into deeper water and the loading would be completed using keels.

Until 1800, the most productive pits were situated upriver from Newcastle, and colliers could not pass the bridge there to load coal. After 1800, coal production switched to further down river, where coal staiths could be used. Already by 1799, the number of keels working on the Tyne was 320 compared with 500 at the peak of their use. At this time, the Wear, with a smaller output of coal, employed 520 keels. Coal staiths were not introduced on the Wear until 1812, but were resisted just as strongly by the keelmen there. They rioted in 1815 in protest at coal being loaded via coal staiths.

== Steam tugs ==
Another threat to the livelihood of the keelmen was the development of steam tugs. During a ten-week strike by the keelmen of both Tyne and Wear against the use of coal staiths, the keel owners installed one of the newly developed steam locomotives in a keel equipped with paddle wheels. The keel was not only able to propel itself, but was able to tow a string of other keels behind it. By 1830, Marshall's shipyard in South Shields had begun to manufacture steam tugs, for the Tyne and for further afield. This development did not threaten the livelihood of the keelmen as completely as the development of the coal staiths.

== Improvements in river navigation ==
As mentioned above, the reason for employing keelmen was the poor state of the navigation on the Tyne and Wear, which prevented ships from moving up river without danger of grounding. As time went by this situation gradually worsened. Colliers arriving at the river mouth would have a ballast of sand that had to be disposed of. The correct method of doing this was to deposit the sand on specified areas on the riverbank provided for the purpose or by depositing the sand in the sea. The Wear had ballast keels that were used to unload the ballast from colliers and take it out to sea. There were penalties for depositing ballast in the river, but this often occurred. The result was that the riverbed became silted up, causing even more navigational difficulties. Additionally, industry on the riverbanks often deposited its waste products in the river. The situation on the Tyne became so bad that in 1850 the Tyne Navigation Act was passed, which gave control of the river to the Tyne Improvement Commission. This body began an extensive program of dredging to substantially deepen the riverbed. This program was completed in 1888 so that the largest colliers could pass right up to Newcastle and beyond. This deepening of the river meant that colliers could load coal from the staiths without the need for keels to complete the work. In 1876 the existing bridge at Newcastle was replaced by the Swing Bridge, which rotated to allow ships to pass up and down river. This allowed colliers to be loaded from staiths above Newcastle and so further sealed the fate of the keelmen.

The Wear Improvement Bill was passed in 1717, creating the River Wear Commission. Building was started on a south pier at the river mouth in 1723 and continued for many years. A north pier was completed in 1797. The piers were intended to improve the flow of water and prevent the river from silting up. The river was dredged in 1749 to improve access, but the use of keels continued undiminished until the introduction of coal staiths in 1813. In 1831 a new harbour was opened at Seaham, further down the Durham coast. This diverted much of the Durham coal away from Sunderland and further threatened the existence of the Wearside keelmen. In 1837 a North Dock was completed at the mouth of the Wear to load colliers and in 1850 a huge South Dock was completed with room for 250 vessels. These loading facilities made keels unnecessary except for inaccessible pits far up river. On the Tyne, three large docks were also constructed for loading coal: Northumberland Dock in 1857; Tyne Dock in 1859; Albert Edward Dock in 1884.

== Final demise ==
By the mid-nineteenth century, less than a fifth of the pits on the Tyne and Wear were using keels to load coal. The introduction of coal staiths and steam tugs had already severely diminished the number of keelmen. The new docks with their efficient coal loading facilities brought the final demise of the keels and the men who worked them. The last few keels survived until the closing years of the 19th century, though by 1889 a writer noted that though some keelmen were still carrying out coal loading, "steamboats now do the work; keels are towed to and from the ships". "It's them steamers that's brust up the keelmen," the last keelman in the Keelmen's Hospital said in 1897, "it's a bonny bad job, but it cannot be helped".

The second half of the nineteenth century was a time of rapid industrial growth on Tyneside and Wearside, so that the keelmen would be readily absorbed within other industries. They are now just a distant memory with little to remind us of them, apart from the Keelmen's Hospital, which still stands in Newcastle, and the well-known local songs "The Keel Row" and "Cushie Butterfield."

== See also ==
- Geordie dialect words
- The Keelmen of Tyneside: Labour Organisation and Conflict in the North-East Coal Industry, 1600-1830 (Regions and Regionalism in History), Joseph M Fewster, Boydell Press, 2011, ISBN 1-84383-632-7 at Amazon.
