= HMS Lynx (1794) =

Sloop of the Royal Navy

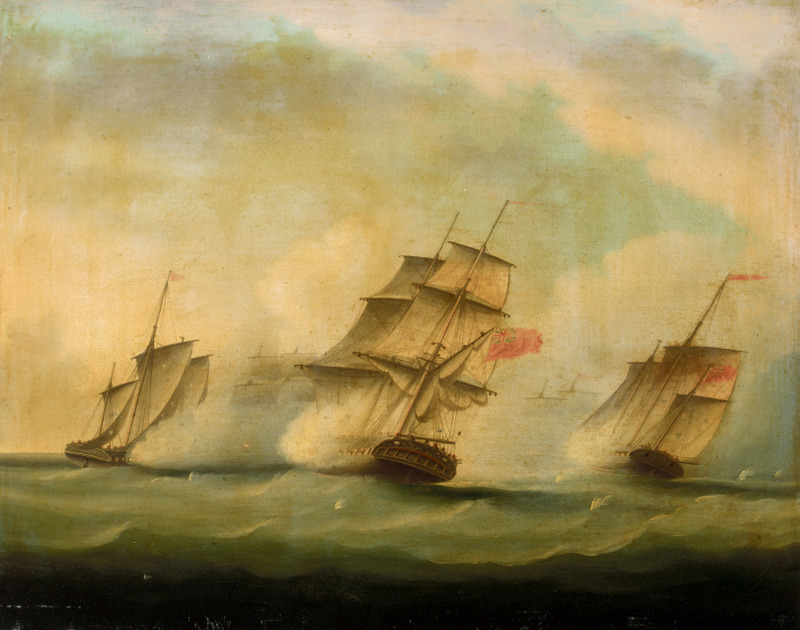
- HMS Lynx and HMS Monkey capturing three Danish luggers, 12 August 1809, oil on canvas, 19th century

History

Great Britain
- Name: HMS Lynx
- Ordered: 18 February 1793
- Builder: William Cleverley, Gravesend
- Laid down: May 1793
- Launched: 14 February 1794
- Completed: 30 May 1794 at Woolwich Dockyard
- Commissioned: April 1794
- Stricken: sold 28 April 1813

United Kingdom
- Name: Recovery
- Owner: Daniel Bennett
- Acquired: 1813 by purchase
- Fate: Broken up 1843

General characteristics
- Class & type: 16-gun Cormorant-class sloop
- Tons burthen: 420, or 4263/94 bm
- Length: Overall:108 ft 4 in (33.0 m), or 112 ft 9 in (34.4 m); Keel:90 ft 9 in (27.7 m)
- Beam: 29 ft 8 1/2 in (9.1 m), or 29 ft 5 in (9.0 m)
- Depth of hold: 9 ft (2.7 m)
- Propulsion: Sails
- Sail plan: Sloop
- Complement: 121
- Armament: 16 × 6-pounder guns; 12 × 1/2-pounder swivel guns

HMS Lynx was a 16-gun ship-rigged sloop of the Cormorant class in the Royal Navy, launched in 1794 at Gravesend. In 1795 she was the cause of an international incident when she fired on USRC Eagle. She was at the Battle of Copenhagen in 1801, and during the French Revolutionary and Napoleonic Wars took numerous prizes, mostly merchant vessels but also including some privateers. She was also at the second Battle of Copenhagen in 1807. She was sold in April 1813. She then became the whaler Recovery. She made 12 whaling voyages in the southern whale fishery, the last one ending in 1843, at which time her owner had her broken up.

== French Revolutionary War ==
Lynx was commissioned in April 1794 under Commander Charles Vinicombe Penrose on the Halifax Station. Penrose was promoted to Post-captain on 7 October 1794 and Commander Charles Rowley replaced Penrose in November.

On 17 November 1794, Lynx recaptured Amphitrite. Cleopatra shared in the reward. By agreement, these vessels also shared the prize money with Africa and Thisbe. Lloyd's List reported that the recapture took place off the Virginia Capes and that Amphitrite had been "much plundered". Lloyd's List later reported that Amphitrite, Tardiff, master, had arrived at Antigua. The report credited the capture to Cleopatra.

On 31 January 1795, Rear-Admiral George Murray, the commander-in-chief on the North America station, sent Lynx, under the command of John Poo Beresford, and the newly-captured former French warship Esperance on a cruise out of Halifax. On 1 March the two vessels captured Cocarde Nationale (or National Cockade), a privateer from Charleston, South Carolina, of 14 guns, six swivels and 80 men. Esperance and Lynx recaptured the ship Norfolk, of Belfast, and the brig George, of Workington.

=== Lynx and Eagle ===
The United States Coast Guard records that in 1795, Lynx, under the command of Beresford, fired a shot across the bow of the United States revenue cutter Eagle. Hendrick Fischer, Eagle's acting captain, attempted to heave-to, but he had on board Senator Pierce Butler, from South Carolina, who ordered him to sail on. Lynx then began to fire continuously as Eagle sailed towards the shoal waters on the north point of Jekyll Island. As Lynx drew too much water to continue the chase, Beresford sent his pinnace and cutter in pursuit, under the command of Lieutenant Alexander Skene, who four years later would command Lynx. Skene's men quickly overtook the schooner and came on board, demanding to know why it had not come about in response to the shots. After learning the schooner was in fact a revenue vessel of the U.S. government, Skene and his men returned to Lynx.

In the ensuing international political furor, Beresford stated that Lynx had been beyond the 12-mile (19 km) limit and noted that the schooner was not flying any flag. Eagle had not in fact flown the national ensign; for unexplained reasons it was instead stored in the captain's cabin. Eagle did apparently display some sort of small pennant that was not visible to Lynx. Unfortunately, the United States Coast Guard history of Eagle represents the only record of the incident.

=== Prize taking ===
On 9 June 1795 Lynx captured Bedford, which had some bullion amongst her cargo. Rowley was apparently again her captain. On 3 July Commander Robert Hall was appointed to command Lynx, but apparently the Admiralty did not confirm the appointment until January 1796.

In August 1795 Commander Thomas Tireman took command of Lynx.

On 24 February 1796, Lynx captured the Hannah. Commander John Rennie replaced Tireman in February 1797. Then in October Hall replaced Rennie and finally took command.

On 13 June 1798, Lynx captured the French privateer Isabelle, of two guns and 30 men. Two weeks later, she captured Mentor, also a French privateer, of 14 six pounders and 79 men. During the chase, Mentor threw six of her guns overboard to lighten her and thus, albeit insufficiently, improve her speed. Both privateers had set out from Puerto Rico to cruise the coast of the United States. Around this time Lynx captured the privateer Solide. The merchants of St. Johns sent Hall a letter of appreciation for the protection this capture gave to the colony.

On 6 July Lynx captured the American ship Pegasus. Four days later Lynx recaptured the American ship Liberty, from Philadelphia and bound for Liverpool, which a French privateer had captured on 4 July, a few hours after Liberty had left the Delaware River. On 8 August Lynx recaptured Friendship.

On 14 April 1799, she and HMS Pheasant captured the American merchant ship General Washington, declaring the arms and military stores on board "contraband".

On 17 September 1799 Lynx captured the brigantine Columbia. In October, Commander Alexander Skene took over command of Lynx.

On 31 August 1800 Lynx captured Vernang. Then on 8 September she captured Vrow Neltje. The gun-vessel Swinger shared in the capture of Vrow Neltje.

In June 1801 Lynx returned to Britain from Copenhagen carrying Captain John F. Devonshire and dispatches. She does not appear to have participated in the Battle of Copenhagen in April as her name does not appear in the list of vessels whose crews qualified to share in the prize money stemming from the battle, nor in the list of vessels whose crew qualified for the Naval General Service Medal for the battle.

Shortly thereafter, on 15 April, Lynx captured the Dutch vessels Charlottenburg and Lucchesine. (Note: Charlottenburg, of 50212/94 tons (bm), was Dutch-built. Von Luchisina, of 36564/94 tons (bm), had been built in Amsterdam, and was pierced for 18 guns. Both vessels had been on their way to Batavia when Lynx captured them off the Texel.) Then on 31 July Lynx and Jalouse captured Brockmerlust, with the capture of Neptunus following on 1 August. The next day Jalouse and Lynx captured the Vrow Caterine. On 8 August Lynx and Squirrel captured Vryheid. Eight days later, Lynx and Driver captured Prosperitas. On 6 September Lynx, Jalouse, Squirrel and Driver shared in the capture of three vessels, Snelle, Jager, and Engestede. Six days later, Lynx, Driver and Aeolus shared in the capture of Cygnet. The next day Lynx and Driver captured Jussrow Harmyna. On 17 September Lynx, Pylades, and Kite recaptured Pursuit. On 11 November Lynx and Driver captured Norden.

Commander John Willoughby Marshall took command of Lynx in June 1802.

== Napoleonic Wars ==
In the months before the resumption of war with France, the Navy started preparations that included impressing seamen. The crews of outbound Indiamen were an attractive target. Woodford and Ganges were sitting in the Thames in March 1803, taking their crews on board just prior to sailing. At sunset, a press gang from HMS Immortalite rowed up to Woodford, while boats from HMS Amethyst and Lynx approached Ganges. As the press gangs approached they were noticed, and the crews of both Indiamen were piped to quarters. That is, they assembled on the decks armed with pikes and cutlasses, and anything they could throw. The officers in charge of the press gangs thought this mere bravado and pulled alongside the Indiamen, only to meet a severe resistance from the crewmen, who had absolutely no desire to serve in the Royal Navy. The men from Immortalite suffered several injuries from shot and pike that were thrown at them, and eventually the marines opened fire with muskets, killing two sailors on Woodford. Even so, the press gangs were not able to get on board either Indiaman, and eventually withdrew some distance. When Woodford's officers finally permitted the press gang from Immortalite to board, all they found on board were a few sickly sailors.

On 23 May 1803, Lynx and Immortalite captured the French ship Paix. A year later, on 10 May 1804, Lynx and Ethalion captured Union.

In July 1804 Lynx took numerous prizes. She took Four Brothers and Nike (or Nilea) on 10 July, Jonge Pieter Casper Piersberg on 12 July, and the brigs Jonge Jan and Jacobus Zeeper on 30 July. Lloyd's List reported that Lynx was in company with the sloop Scorpion and the gun-brig Censor, and that together they captured 10 vessels that were sailing from Riga to Emden carrying masts. By this account the vessels they captured were: Vrow Hermina, Bowman, master; Juno, Gulzeet, master; Frau Margaretta, Roloff, master; General Van Bloucher, Ruyle, master; Jonge Oune & Brower, Ruyle, master; Four Brothers, Stemmings, master; Jonge Peter Caspar, Jobs, master; Gute Foffnung; and Piepersburg. The British sent their captives into Yarmouth.

In April 1806 Lynx captured several Prussian vessels. These were Electrum, Romulus, Goode Intentie, and Vrow Mazka, on the 15th, 21st, and 26th. Earlier, in company with Texel and Nightingale, Lynx captured the Prussian ship Einigkeit on 6 April. They also captured Jonge Ebeling, Freundschaft, and Morgenstern off Lieth. Then on 20 April Lynx captured another Prussian vessel, Fortuna.

On 21 April 1807, Lynx recaptured the brig Providence, Edward Fox, Master. Lynx, the hired armed cutter Lord Kieth, and Resolution shared in the proceeds of the capture of the Danish merchant-vessel Adjutor, on 6 August. Eight days later Lynx, Resolution and Ariel shared in the capture of Aurora.

Lynx shared with Ariadne in the capture of Catharina Frederika on 3 June. That same day the two British ships also captured the Philip. On 13 July they captured Jussrouw Antje. The gun-brig Constant shared with Lynx the capture, on 7 May, of Rebecca and Jonge Tobias. Lynx also shared in the prize money for captures at Heligoland on 5 September in connection with the surrender of the Danish fleet at the Battle of Copenhagen.

On 22 March 1808, Lynx, Falcon, and Quebec were present at the Battle of Zealand Point, though they did not actually take part in the battle. In the battle the ships of the line Stately and Nassau succeeded in destroying the Danish ship of the line Prinds Christian Frederik.

In May, Lynx shared with Salsette in the capture of a schuyt. While sailing in company with the gun-brig Snipe, Lynx captured Jagten Sophia Cecilia on 12 July. On 16 November Lynx captured three vessels: Neptune, Resolution, and Elizabeth. In December, Lynx captured Achir, Kairn, Elizabeth, Haabert, Spimgeren, Venus, St. Andreas, Nicholay, and Ann, on the 11th, 13th, 14th, and 15 December.

On 30 April 1809 Vanguard, in company with Lynx and Tartar, captured Charlotte.

On 12 August, Commander John Willoughby Marshall and Lynx, in the company of the gun-brig Monkey under the command of Lieutenant Thomas Fitzgerald, discovered three Danish luggers off the Danish coast. The water was too shallow for Lynx, so Marshall sent Monkey and boats from Lynx in to cut them out. The largest of the luggers, which had four guns and four howitzers, opened fire on Monkey before all three luggers ran ashore once Monkey and the launch's 18-pounder carronade returned fire. The British refloated the luggers and brought them out the next day, having taken no casualties. In their haste to quit the vessel, the Danes failed to fire the fuse on a cask of gunpowder they had left by the fireplace on the largest lugger. Marshall thought the Danes' behaviour in leaving the explosive device disgraceful. The largest lugger was Captain Japen (or Captain Jassen). She had had a crew of 45 men, who had fled, and during the engagement she had thrown two of her howitzers overboard. The second lugger, name unknown, had four guns and a crew of 20. The third lugger was Speculation, of three guns and 19 men. Her crew too had thrown two guns overboard. At the end of the month, on 27 August, Lynx captured a Danish sloop that also bore the name Speculation.

On 28 October 1809 Cheerful captured Destrigheiden, Rinaldine and a sloop, name unknown, while in the company of Tartar and Lynx. By agreement, Marshall and Commander Joseph Baker of Tartar pooled their share of the prize money with that due Lieutenant Daniel Carpenter, the commander of Cheerful. (Note: As a result, each of the three received £29 5s 2 3/4d. Without the pooling Carpenter, because of his junior rank, would only have received £7 10s 5 3/4d.)

Vanguard and Plantagenet were in company with Lynx on 2 November when they captured Ornen and another vessel. Lynx was again in company with Vanguard on 4 November when they captured Frende Broder. Five days later Lynx captured the Danish sloops St. Ole and Sterkadder.

On 29 and 30 April 1810 Lynx, the gun-brig Flamer and the frigate Fisgard captured three privateers. On the 29th they captured Juliana off Wismar. Juliana had six guns but a crew of only 23 men. The next day they captured Ziska off Trindelen. She was armed with six guns and had a crew of 40 men. At the same time they captured Omen, of one gun.

On 30 May, Lynx and Flamer captured the Danish vessel Hercules. By agreement, the British vessels shared the proceeds with Fisgard. The three vessels also shared in Fisgard's capture of the French privateer Furet, of two guns, off Warnemünde. Lynx again shared by agreement with Fisgard in the proceeds of the recapture of Margaretha Catarina and James Cook on 10 June. Fisgard also shared by agreement her portion with Flamer, as well as the proceeds of the capture of Gopa on 22 June.

On 9 July 1810, Lynx captured the Danish sloop Wanderingsmannen. Flamer shared in the prize.

In October Commander Thomas Percival took command. On 10 November the American ship Hercules arrived at Leith. She was carrying a cargo of salt and was a prize to Lynx.

Then on 20 December Lynx captured Fortuna. Two days later, Lynx came across the derelict Providence at sea. Lynx took possession and in 1811 received salvage money for the vessel. Lloyd's List reported ion 8 January 1811 that Providence, of Harwich, which had been taken and which Lynx had retaken, had been driven ashore at Yarmouth.

=== Disposal ===
Lynx was laid up at Deptford in May 1811. The "Principal Officers and Commissioners of His Majesty's Navy" first offered "Lynx, of 425 tons", lying at Deptford, for sale on 28 April 1813. She was sold there for £1330 on 24 April 1813.

== Whaler ==
Daniel Bennett purchased Lynx in 1813 and renamed her Recovery. She replaced a Recovery that Bennett had just had broken up. Over the course of his career as a shipowner, Bennett owned more than 50 vessels, all or almost all whalers that worked in the southern whale fishery. Recovery entered Lloyd's Register in 1814 with Bacon, master, Bennett, owner, and trade London–South Seas.

1st whaling voyage (1813–1814): Captain William Beacon, who had been master of the previous Recovery, sailed Recovery from England on 9 August 1813. He returned on 9 August 1814.

2nd whaling voyage (1814–1815): Captain Beacon sailed from England in October 1814, bound for South Georgia. He returned on 2 June 1815.

3rd whaling voyage (1815–1816): Captain Beacon sailed in August 1815. He returned on 23 March 1816 with some 700 barrels of oil.

4th whaling voyage (1816–1817): Captain Beacon sailed on 30 April 1816.

5th whaling voyage (1817–1819): Captain Beacon sailed on 1 August 1817, bound for the Isle of Desolation. He returned with 650 casks of oil and 130 skins on 4 May 1819.

6th whaling voyage (1819–1821): Captain Beacon sailed from England on 11 June 1819, bound for Peru. He returned on 6 September 1821 with 700 casks of oil and 50 skins.

7th whaling voyage (1821–1824): Captain Edwards, Darnley, or Darney, sailed from England on 8 October 1821. He returned on 10 March 1824 with 550 barrels of oil.

8th whaling voyage (1824–1827): Captain William Tolley Brookes sailed from England on 18 August 1824, bound for Peru. He returned on 13 September 1827 with 700 casks of oil, fins (baleen), and 230 skins.

9th whaling voyage (1828–1831): Captain Brookes sailed from England on 11 March 1828, bound for the Sandwich Islands. He returned on 11 March 1831 with 950 casks of oil.

10th whaling voyage (1831–1835): Captain Robert Clark Morgan sailed from England on 14 December 1831, bound for the Sandwich Islands. He returned on 26 June 1835 with 560 casks of oil.

11th whaling voyage (1835–1839): Captain William Green sailed from England on 4 October 1835, bound for the Pacific Ocean. He returned on 3 July 1839 with 2120 barrels of oil, a full cargo.

12th whaling voyage (1839–1843): Captain Thomas Heriot sailed from England on 8 November 1839, bound for Timor. He returned on 17 May 1843 with 440 casks (183 tons) of oil.

== Fate ==
Lloyd's Register for 1843 has the notation "Broken up" by Recovery's name.
