= Amphitrite (1790 ship) =

History

Great Britain
- Name: Amphitrite
- Namesake: Amphitrite
- Builder: John and Francis Barry, Whitby
- Launched: 1790
- Captured: 1794 but recaptured
- Fate: Last listed 1811

General characteristics
- Tons burthen: 284, or 285, or 286, or 305 (bm)
- Armament: 1800: 4 × 6-pounder guns; 1810: 6 × 18-pounder carronades

Amphitrite was launched at Whitby in 1790. A French privateer captured her in 1794, but the Royal Navy recaptured her. She spent much of her career as a West Indiaman, finishing as a London transport. She was last listed in 1810 or 1811.

== Career ==
Lloyd's Register for 1790 showed Amphitrite with C.Pearson, master, James Atty, owner, and trade Liverpool–Riga. The next year her owners changed her registry to Jersey.

Lloyd's Register for 1794–95 showed Amphitrite with P.Tardiff, master, C.Epriox, owner, and trade London–Jamaica.

Lloyd's List (LL) reported on 23 December 1794 that a privateer had captured Amphitrite, Tardiff, master, about six miles from the east end of Jamaica. Amphitrite had been sailing from London to Jamaica.

Then on 17 November 1794, HMS Lynx recaptured Amphrite. Cleopatra shared in the reward. By agreement, these vessels also shared the prize money with Africa and Thisbe. Lloyd's List reported that the recapture took place off the Virginia Capes and that Amphitrite had been "much plundered". Lloyd's List later reported that Amphitrite, Tardiff, master, had arrived at Antigua. The report credited the capture to Cleopatra.

Year	Master	Owner	Trade	Source
1796	P.Tardiff	Epriox	London–Jamaica	LR
1798	P.Tardiff	Epriox	London–Jamaica	LR
1799	Mitchell	A.Brebner	London–Martinique	LR; damages and good repair 1796
1800	Mitchell	Bredner	London–Dominica	Register of Shipping (RS); good repair 1796
1805	W.Courage	Brebner & Co.	London–Tobago	LR; repair 1792
1810	R.Clarke	Brebner	London transport	RS; good repair 1803

== Fate ==
Amphitrite was last listed in 1810 (Lloyd's Register) or 1811 (Register of Shipping)
