= Jack Bailey =

Jack Bailey is the name of:

== Politics ==
- Jack Bailey (Maryland politician) (born 1965), American politician
- Jack Bailey (Georgia politician) (1812–1897), American slave owner, politician, lawyer and soldier
- John Bailey (Massachusetts politician) (1786–1835), American politician
- Jack Bailey (New South Wales politician) (1871–1947), Australian politician
- Jack Bailey (co-operator) (1898–1969), Welsh co-operative activist, councillor and General Secretary of the Co-operative Party

== Sports ==
- Jack Bailey (footballer, born 1901) (1901–?), English football inside-forward
- Jack Bailey (footballer, born 1921) (1921–1986), English football left-back
- J. A. Bailey (Jack Arthur Bailey, 1930–2018), English cricketer and administrator

== Entertainment ==
- Jack Bailey (actor) (1907–1980), American actor and daytime game show host

== See also ==
- John Bailey (disambiguation)
