= Gailen David =

- Occupations: TV presenter, producer, writer
- Known for: Take Off! with The Savvy Stews, The Jet Set
- Website: gailendavid.com

Gailen David is an American former flight attendant, labor activist and entrepreneur. He is best known for Take Off! with The Savvy Stews, The Jet Set and his appearance in the film, Miami Shakedown.

== Background ==
David began his career in 1977, at the age of 10, when he began working as an amateur travel agent. By the age of 19, he began applying for flight attendant jobs and became an attendant in American Airlines in 1988.

In 1998, after several inflight conflicts with passengers, he took an extended leave of absence. After 10 months, he returned with a positive attitude and began his second virtual career as a motivational speaker making presentations at workshops about how he became a good purser using a video clips series entitled Why I Fly — Gailen's Story. A video version was on YouTube before being yanked by American Airlines citing copyright issues.

In 2007, David coined Jetiquette as a campaign to advocate for a friendlier travel experience. Originally delivered at American Airlines, the campaign evolved into a training program and a book.

In 2012, David was fired from his job after 24 years as a flight attendant at American Airlines after he posted a series of management-parody videos entitled, Aluminum Lady, which criticized the unfair treatment of workers during American's bankruptcy. In April 2012, American sued him in Tarrant County state district court in Texas, accusing him of releasing passengers' private travel information, after he publicly revealed the airline's executives moving first class passengers to coach to make room for themselves and traveling companions and board members delaying flights for their convenience. American eventually dropped the lawsuit. Following a wrongful termination grievance filed by the flight attendant's union, David agreed to receive a settlement instead of rehiring.

In 2021, David, in partnership with Stephen Licata, co-founded The First Flight Out, a Pan Am exhibit and travel emporium located in Miami's Coconut Grove neighborhood.

== TV career ==
In September 2014, David began appearing in Take Off! With the Savvy Stews, an American travel-themed television series hosted by The Savvy Stews, and aired on CNN Airport.

In February 2016, David co-created The Jet Set, an American TV travel talk show which aired by several stations such as AMGTV, Z Living, ABC, NBC, and CBS.

=== Filmography ===
List of television shows involving Gailen David
Work	Date	Role
Miami Shakedown	1993	cameraman
Take Off! With the Savvy Stews	2014	co-host, executive producer, writer
The Jet Set	2016 - 2019	co-host, executive producer
The Tech Show (TV Series)	2017	executive producer
