= HMS Cleopatra (1779) =

Royal Navy frigate

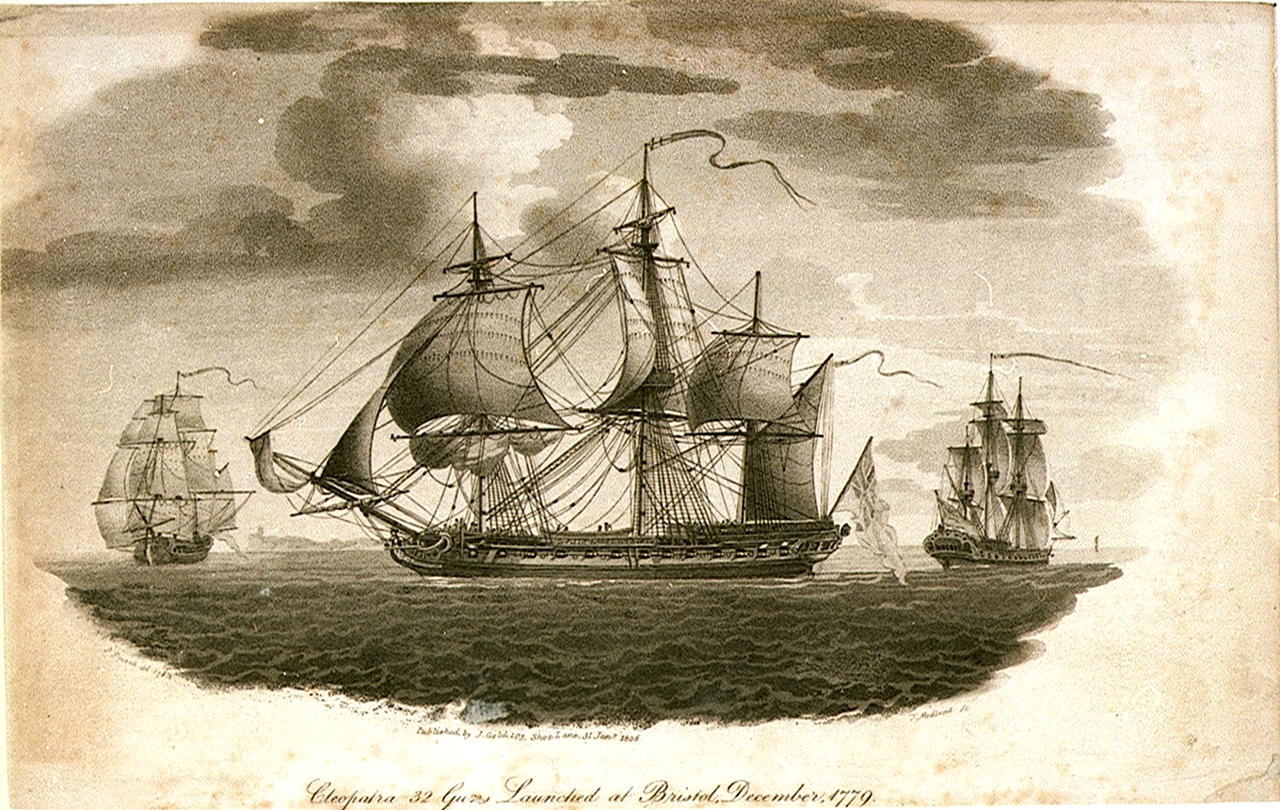
- 1805 engraving of Cleopatra (centre) by Nicholas Pocock

History

Great Britain
- Name: HMS Cleopatra
- Ordered: 13 May 1778
- Builder: James Martin Hillhouse, Bristol
- Laid down: 6 July 1778
- Launched: 26 November 1779
- Completed: By 9 September 1780
- Fate: Broken up by 21 September 1814
- Notes: Participated in: Battle of Dogger Bank

General characteristics
- Class & type: 32-gun Amazon-class fifth rate frigate
- Tons burthen: 689 17/94 bm
- Length: 126 ft 5 in (38.5 m) (overall); 104 ft 6.25 in (31.9 m) (keel)
- Beam: 35 ft 2.5 in (10.7 m)
- Depth of hold: 12 ft 1.75 in (3.70 m)
- Propulsion: Sails
- Sail plan: Full-rigged ship
- Complement: 220
- Armament: Upper deck: 26 × 12-pdrs; Quarter deck: 4 × 6 pdrs + 4 × 18-pdr carronades; Forecastle: 2 × 6 pdrs + 2 × 18-pdr carronades

HMS Cleopatra was a 32-gun Amazon-class fifth-rate frigate of the Royal Navy. She had a long career, seeing service during the Fourth Anglo-Dutch War, and the French Revolutionary and Napoleonic Wars. During the latter wars she fought two notable engagements with larger French opponents. In the first engagement she was forced to surrender, but succeeded in damaging the French ship so badly that she was captured several days later, while Cleopatra was retaken. In the second she forced the surrender of a 40-gun frigate. After serving under several notable commanders she was broken up towards the end of the Napoleonic Wars.

== Construction ==
Cleopatra was ordered on 13 May 1778 and was laid down on 6 July 1778 at the yards of James Martin Hillhouse, Bristol. She was launched on 26 November 1779 and had been completed by 9 September 1780. £9,202 (approximately £1.43 million at today's prices)was paid to the builder, with another £5,563.1.5d (approximately £860,000 at today's prices)spent on dockyard expenditures. Cleopatra was commissioned in October 1779 under her first commander, Captain George Murray.

== Career ==
=== Fourth Anglo Dutch War ===
Cleopatra was initially assigned to serve with the Western squadron and was soon active in activities to suppress French cruisers and privateers. On 15 June 1780 Cleopatra and HMS Apollo captured the 26-gun Stanisland off Ostend; while the privateer Comtesse de Provence fell to Cleopatra on 11 November 1780. Cleopatra escorted a convoy to the Baltic on 1781, becoming involved in the Battle of Dogger Bank on 5 August. She passed under the command of Captain Henry Harvey in January 1783, but was paid off in April that year and fitted for ordinary at Sheerness. She remained laid up until 1790 when she began a Great Repair, and was recommissioned in January 1793 under Captain Alexander Ball.

=== French Revolutionary and Napoleonic Wars ===
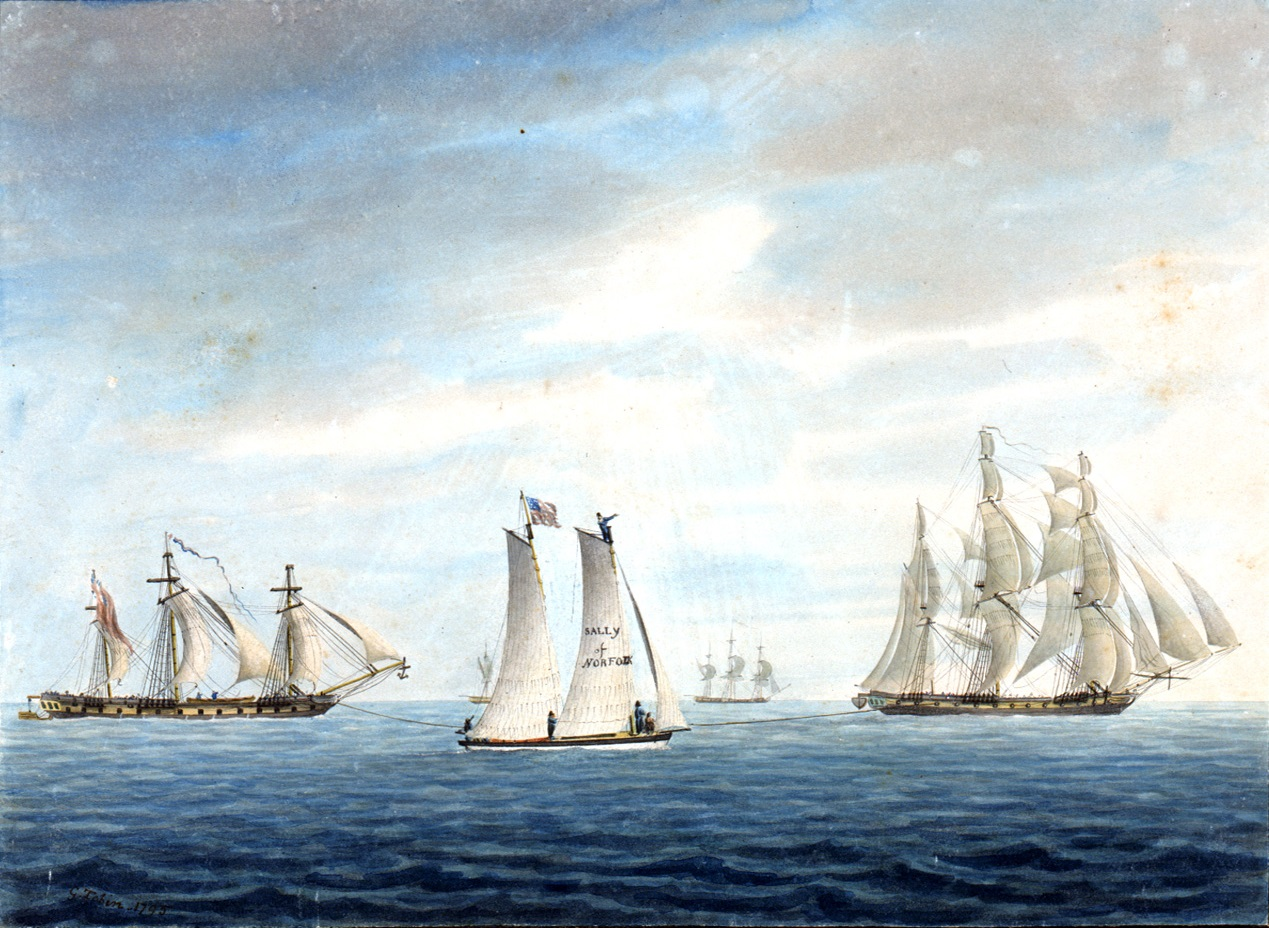
Cleopatra towing Thetis towards the Chesapeake on 31 December 1794

Cleopatra continued her effective career against raiders by capturing the privateer Trois Amis on 24 March 1793 in company with HMS Lizard. She was operating from Nova Scotia from 1794.

On 17 November 1794, Lynx recaptured Amphitrite. Cleopatra shared in the reward. By agreement, these vessels also shared the prize money with Africa and Thisbe. Lloyd's List reported that the recapture took place off the Virginia Capes and that Amphitrite had been "much plundered". Lloyd's List later reported that Amphitrite, Tardiff, master, had arrived at Antigua. The report credited the capture to Cleopatra.

Cleopatra was under Captain Charles Penrose in June 1795. Command passed to Captain Charles Rowley who captured the French privateer Aurore on 3 March 1796, or 22 April that year. (Note: Aurore, of 10 guns, had been commissioned in early 1796 under Captain Beaut.) Rowley went on to capture the 12-gun privateer Hirondelle during his tenure, before Captain Israel Pellew took over command of Cleopatra in September 1797.

Pellew served briefly in the English Channel, taking the 16-gun privateer Emilie on 26 March 1798.

On 28 February, in longitude 15, in a fog, the merchant armed brig Herald lost her convoy; and on 30 March, was chased by a frigate, which brought her too, after running 15 hours to the eastward. The frigate proved to be Cleopatra, Captain Israel Pellew, who treated her politely, and informed that she (with Nautilus) had retaken the William Penn, from Philadelphia, and also, a French privateer of 16 guns and 130 men.

He then returned Cleopatra to Halifax in August that year. She operated off the American coasts, ranging as far as the Caribbean and Cuba. On a cruise in the Summer of 1800 she captured 8 American vessels including U. S. Navy chartered schooner "Diana" and sent them to Halifax, though under unknown legal reasons for seizing American ships. Under orders from Sir William Parker the ship was sent to the Bahamas with a convoy but was accidentally beached without damage. Parker served as a Royal Navy officer during the French Revolutionary Wars.

She and HMS Andromache captured a Spanish gunboat on 22 March 1801. Pellew then returned Cleopatra to Britain, where she spent between 1802 and 1804 under repair at Woolwich, recommissioning in July 1804 under Captain Charles Elphinstone. Elphinstone's tenure lasted less than a month; by August Cleopatra was sailing under Captain Sir Robert Laurie.

=== Fight with Ville de Milan ===
Cleopatra spent some time in the West Indies, and was homeward bound in February 1805. While sailing off Bermuda Cleopatra sighted a sail--the 40-gun French frigate Ville de Milan. Ville de Milan had sailed from Martinique on 28 January under Captain Jean-Marie Renaud and was bound for France with several important dispatches. Despite identifying his quarry as a superior opponent, Laurie ordered a chase. Renaud had orders to avoid combat and pressed on sail to escape Laurie. The chase covered 180 miles and lasted until the following morning, when Renaud reluctantly came about to meet Cleopatra, which was overhauling Ville de Milan. The engagement began in earnest at 2:30pm, and a heavy cannonade was maintained between the two frigates until 5pm, when Cleopatra had her wheel shot away and her rudder jammed. Ville de Milan approached from windward and ran aboard Cleopatra, jamming her bowsprit over the quarterdeck while raking Cleopatra's decks with musket fire. The British resisted one attempt to board, but on being unable to break free, were forced to surrender to a second boarding party. Cleopatra had 22 killed and 36 wounded, with the loss of her foremast, mainmast and bowsprit. Ville de Milan probably had about 30 killed and wounded, with Captain Renaud among the dead. She also lost her mainmast and mizzenmast. Three days were spent transferring a prize crew and prisoners, and patching up the ships, before the two got underway on 21 February.

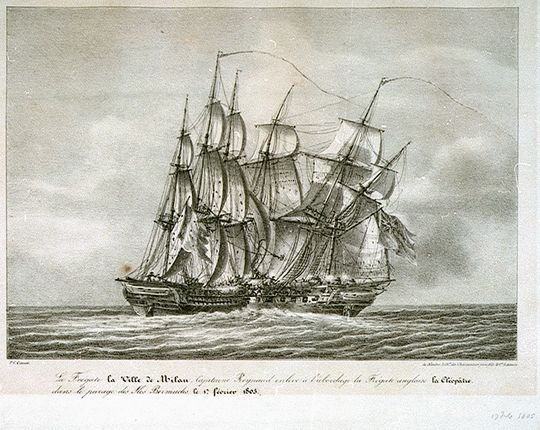
Battle between Ville de Milan and HMS Cleopatra, depicted in a contemporary print

However, on 23 February they were discovered by the 50-gun HMS Leander, under Captain John Talbot. Leander ran up to them, whereupon they separated. Talbot chased Cleopatra, brought her to with a shot and took possession. The freed crew reported the situation to Talbot, and left him to pursue the fleeing Ville de Milan. Talbot soon overtook her and she surrendered without a fight. He took both back to Halifax. There Ville de Milan was taken into service as HMS Milan, with Laurie as her captain. Laurie's engagement with the superior opponent had initially cost him his ship, but had rendered her easy prey to any other Royal Navy frigate in the vicinity. Had he not brought her to battle, Ville de Milan could have easily outsailed Leander or even engaged her on fairly equal terms. Instead the damage and losses incurred in defeating Cleopatra had left Ville de Milan helpless to resist.

=== Later actions ===
With the loss of her captain to the command of Milan, Cleopatra was recommissioned in July 1805 under Captain John Wright. She remained on the Halifax station, from September 1806 under Captain Robert Simpson. Cleopatra, which was under the command of Captain William Love, Pert, and Maria shared in the capture of Jane, Collins, master, on 25 June 1807. (Note: The share of a seaman in the prize money was 14s 8½d.)

From August 1808, Cleopatra was under Captain Samuel Pechell. On 22 January 1809 she fought an action with the 40-gun Topaze, and with the support of HMS Jason and HMS Hazard, captured Topaze. Cleopatra was then present at the Invasion of Martinique in February 1809. Captain Charles Austen took command in October 1810, with command reverting to Pechell in July 1811. Captain Charles Gill took over in December 1812, followed in an acting capacity by Captain William M'Culloch in 1814.

== Fate ==
Cleopatra was paid off in July 1814 and broken up at Deptford by 21 September 1814.
