= John Baillie =

John Baillie may refer to:

- John Baillie (fl. 1747), author of An Essay on the Sublime
- John Baillie (minister) (1741–1806), English divine, became a minister in 1767
- John Baillie of Leys (1772–1833), officer in the British East India Company, professor and politician
- John Baillie (railway engineer) (1806–1859), born in Newcastle upon Tyne, but worked in Austria and Germany
- John Baillie (theologian) (1886–1960), Scottish theologian and Church of Scotland minister
- John M. Baillie (1847–1913), farmer, school teacher and political figure in Nova Scotia

== See also ==
- John Baillie McIntosh (1829–1888), unionist in the American Civil War
- John Bailey (disambiguation)
- John Bailie, Northern Irish unionist activist
- John Bayley (disambiguation)
- John Baily (disambiguation)
