= Jonathan Bailey House =

Jonathan Bailey House can refer to:

- Jonathan Bailey House (Whittier, California), listed on the National Register of Historic Places in Los Angeles County, California
- Jonathan Bailey House (Milo, New York), listed on the National Register of Historic Places in Yates County, New York

== See also ==
- Jonathan Bailey (disambiguation)
- Bailey House (disambiguation)
