= Laurie baronets of Maxwelton (1685) =

Escutcheon of the Laurie baronets of Maxwelton

The Laurie baronetcy, of Maxwelton in the County of Dumfries, was created in the Baronetage of Nova Scotia on 27 March 1685 for Robert Laurie. He was the son of John Laurie, shire commissioner for Dumfriesshire.

The 4th Baronet represented Dumfries in the House of Commons; while the 5th Baronet sat for Dumfriesshire. The title became extinct on the death of the 6th Baronet in 1848.

== Laurie baronets, of Maxwelton (1685) ==
- Sir Robert Laurie, 1st Baronet (died 1698)
- Sir Robert Laurie, 2nd Baronet (c. 1674–1702)
- Sir Walter Laurie, 3rd Baronet (died 1731)
- Sir Robert Laurie, 4th Baronet (died 1779)
- Sir Robert Laurie, 5th Baronet (c. 1738–1804)
- Sir Robert Laurie, 6th Baronet (1764–1848)

== Extended family ==
The Scottish song Annie Laurie is about Annie, the daughter of the 1st Baronet, and her romance with William Douglas.
