= The Jet Set (TV program) =

American travel TV show

- Genre: Travel and Lifestyle Talk Show
- Created by: Bobby Laurie, Gailen David
- Directed by: April Carter
- Starring: Bobby Laurie, Nikki Noya
- Country of origin: United States
- Original languages: English; Spanish
- No. of seasons: 5

Production
- Executive producer: Brad Smith
- Producers: April Carter, Bobby Laurie, Nikki Noya
- Production location: Washington, D.C.
- Running time: 24 minutes
- Production company: On It Media

Original release
- Network: AMGTV, Z Living
- Release: March 5, 2016

The Jet Set (also known as Jet Set TV) is an American travel-themed nationally syndicated television series which is broadcast weekly. The show debuted with hosts Bobby Laurie, Jessica Reyes and Gailen David. In 2018 Nikki Noya replaced Jessica Reyes and in 2019 Gailen David left the show. The travel and lifestyle show started in 2016 and has been running for 5 seasons so far. The show is produced by On it media where the production studio is located at Washington DC.

== Episodes and Broadcast ==
The first episode of the Jet Set was broadcast on 5 March 2016. Since then total of five seasons of the show has been filmed with each season having more or less 40 episodes each. The show is broadcast on different networks including AMGTV, Z Living, STARLITE, ABC, NBC and CBS stations. The historical episodes are watchable from the website of the Jet Set Tv. The show is available over on demand video services like Amazon fireTV, Roku, Apple podcast etc. as well.

While the main language for the talk show is English, it has a corresponding text based news service portal 'TJS Espanol' delivering news and information in the same domain, which is available only in spanish language.

== Receptions ==
The show is known for providing travel related information, guides and advising on dos and don't with emphasis on flights and air travel .

During January 2018, a news story reported by Jet Set TV attracted considerable media attention where a female traveler along with her 'emotional support' peacock was prohibited from being onboarded by United Airlines at Newark airport. The event, as reported triggered a lot of commentaries and remarks both in favor and against the existing policies and regulations about the 'emotional support' animals on flight. As the repercussion due to the news and its associated commentaries, United Airlines was compelled to change its policy on 'emotional support' animals.
