= Wrixon-Becher baronets =

Baronetcy in the Baronetage of the United Kingdom

- Escutcheon of the Wrixon-Becher baronets of Ballygiblin
- Creation date: 1831
- Status: extant
- Motto: Bis vivit qui bene, He lives twice who lives well

The Wrixon-Becher Baronetcy, of Ballygiblin in the County of Cork, is a title in the Baronetage of the United Kingdom. It was created on 30 September 1831 for William Wrixon-Becher, Member of Parliament for Mallow from 1818 to 1826. Born George Wrixon, he assumed by Royal licence his mother's maiden surname of Becher in 1831. The Becher family were major landowners in County Cork.

The family seat was at Castle Hyde, near Fermoy, County Cork.

== Wrixon-Becher baronets, of Ballygiblin (1831) ==
- Sir William Wrixon-Becher, 1st Baronet (1780–1850)
- Sir Henry Wrixon-Becher, 2nd Baronet (1826–1893)
- Sir John Wrixon-Becher, 3rd Baronet (1828–1914)
- Sir Eustace William Wyndham Wrixon-Becher, 4th Baronet (1859–1934)
- Sir William Fane Wrixon-Becher, 5th Baronet (1915–2000)
- Sir John William Michael Wrixon-Becher, 6th Baronet (born 1950)

There is no heir to the title.

Baronetage of the United Kingdom
| Preceded by Walsham baronets | Wrixon-Becher baronets of Ballygiblin; 30 September 1831 | Succeeded by Russell baronets |
