= John Baily =

John Baily may refer to:

- John Baily (ethnomusicologist) (born 1943), British ethnomusicologist
- John Walker Baily (1809–1873), English archaeologist
- John Baily (MP), MP for Chippenham

== See also ==
- John Bailey (disambiguation)
- John Baillie (disambiguation)
- John Bayley (disambiguation)
