= John Bailey =

John Bailey (often nicknamed Jack) is the name of:

== People ==
=== Arts and entertainment ===
- Jack Bailey (actor) (1907–1980), American actor and daytime game show host
- John Bailey (British actor) (1912–1989), British screen and TV actor
- John Bailey (American actor) (1947–1994), a.k.a. Jack Baker
- John Bailey (cinematographer) (1942–2023), American cinematographer and film director
- John Bailey (critic) (1864–1931), English literary critic, lecturer, and chairman of the National Trust
- John Bailey (producer), Canadian recording engineer and producer
- John William Bailey (1831–1914), British miniature painter

=== Law ===
- John O. Bailey (1880–1959), State supreme court justice from Oregon
- John P. Bailey (born 1951), United States federal judge
- John Bailey (solicitor) (1928–2021), British lawyer and public servant

=== Politics ===
- John Bailey (MP) (died 1436), English politician
- John Bailey (Australian politician) (born 1954), Australian politician
- Jack Bailey (Maryland politician) (born 1965), American politician
- John Bailey (Massachusetts politician) (1786–1835), American politician
- Jack Bailey (New South Wales politician) (1871–1947), Australian politician
- John Edgar Bailey (1897–1958), Northern Irish politician
- John H. Bailey (1864–1940), American politician, senator and representative in Texas
- John Moran Bailey (1904–1975), United States politician, chair of the Democratic National Committee
- John Mosher Bailey (1838–1916), U.S. Representative from New York
- John Bailey (Irish politician) (1945–2019), member of Dun Laoghaire/Rathdown County Council
- Jack Bailey (co-operator) (1898–1969), Welsh co-operative activist, councillor and General Secretary of the Co-operative Party
- John Bailey (Victorian politician) (1826–1871), Australian politician
- John D. Bailey (1928–2018), American mayor of St. Augustine, Florida

=== Sports ===
- Jack Bailey (footballer, born 1901) (1901–?), English football inside-forward
- Jack Bailey (footballer, born 1921) (1921–1986), English football left-back
- John Bailey (footballer, born 1950), English football wing-half, currently chairman of Didcot Town F.C.
- John Bailey (footballer, born 1957), English football left-back
- John Bailey (footballer, born 1969), English football midfielder
- John Bailey (rugby league) (born 1954), Australian rugby league footballer and coach
- John Bailey (English cricketer) (born 1940), English cricketer
- John Bailey (New Zealand cricketer) (born 1941), New Zealand cricketer

=== Other ===
- John Bailey (minister) (1643–1697), English dissenting minister, later in life in New England
- John Bailey (agriculturist) (1750–1819), English agriculturist and engraver
- John Bailey (luthier) (1931–2011), maker of fine guitars in England
- J. Michael Bailey (born 1957), American psychologist and professor at Northwestern University
- John Bailey (cutler) (1736–?), American cutler and metalworker
- John Eglington Bailey (1840–1888), English antiquary
- John Frederick Bailey (1866–1938), botanist and horticulturist in Queensland, Australia

== See also ==
- J. V. Bailey House (John Vincent Bailey House), Saint Paul, Minnesota, USA
- Jack Bailey (disambiguation)
- Jonathan Bailey (disambiguation)
- John Baillie (disambiguation)
- John Bayley (disambiguation)
- John Baily (disambiguation)
