= HMS Milan =

Frigate of the Royal Navy

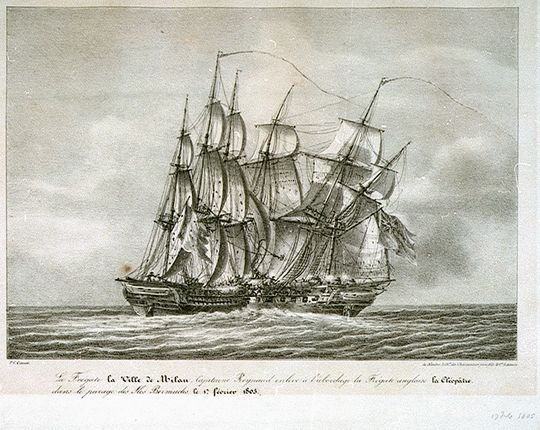
- Battle between Ville de Milan and HMS Cleopatra, depicted in a contemporary print

History

France
- Name: Hermione
- Builder: Lorient (Constructeur:Antoine Geoffroy)
- Laid down: January 1803
- Launched: 15 November 1803
- Completed: By February 1804
- Renamed: Ville de Milan (26 December 1803)
- Captured: 23 February 1805, by the Royal Navy

United Kingdom
- Name: HMS Milan
- Acquired: 23 February 1805
- Nickname(s): Wheel 'em Along
- Fate: Broken up in December 1815

General characteristics
- Class & type: 38-gun fifth rate frigate
- Displacement: 1,350 tons (French)
- Tons burthen: 1,085 91/94 (bm)
- Length: 153 ft 1 in (46.7 m) (overall); 128 ft 8 in (39.2 m) (keel)
- Beam: 39 ft 10.5 in (12.2 m)
- Depth of hold: 12 ft 10 in (3.91 m)
- Propulsion: Sails
- Sail plan: Full-rigged ship
- Complement: 300 (later 315)
- Armament: French service: UD:28 × 18-pounder guns (later 26); Spardeck:14 × 36-pounder obusiers + 4 × 8-pounder guns; British service: UD: 28 × 18-pounder guns; QD: 12 × 32-pounder carronades; Fc: 2 × 9-pounder guns + 2 × 32-pounder carronades.

HMS Milan was a 38-gun fifth rate frigate of the Royal Navy. She had previously been Ville de Milan, a 40-gun frigate of the French Navy, but served for only a year before being chased down and engaged by the smaller 32-gun frigate HMS Cleopatra. Ville de Milan defeated and captured her opponent, but suffered so much damage that she was forced to surrender without a fight several days later when both ships encountered HMS Leander, a British fourth rate. Milan went on to serve with the Royal Navy for another ten years, before being broken up in 1815, after the conclusion of the Napoleonic Wars.

== Construction and French career ==
Ville de Milan was built at Lorient to a one-off design by Antoine Geoffroy. She was originally named Hermione, but was renamed after her launch; she was completed for service by February 1804. She was assigned to the West Indies and sailed from Martinique on 28 January under Captain Jean-Marie Renaud, bound for France with important despatches.

On 16 February Ville de Milan was spotted off Bermuda by the 32-gun HMS Cleopatra, under Captain Sir Robert Laurie. Laurie ordered a chase, while Renaud, who had orders to avoid combat, pressed on sail in an attempt to escape. The chase covered 180 miles and lasted until the following morning, when it became clear to Renaud that he was being overhauled and would be forced to fight. He reluctantly prepared to meet Cleopatra, with the ships exchanging fire, Cleopatra from her bowchasers, Ville de Milan from her stern battery. The engagement began in earnest at 2.30pm, and a heavy cannonade was maintained between the two frigates until 5pm. Cleopatra had suffered heavy damage to her rigging, and now tried to manoeuvre across the Frenchman's bows to rake her. While doing so she had her wheel shot away and her rudder jammed. Ville de Milan approached from windward and ran aboard Cleopatra, jamming her bowsprit over the quarterdeck of the British ship and raked her decks with musket fire. The British resisted one attempt to board, but on being unable to break free, were forced to surrender to a second boarding party. Cleopatra had 22 killed and 36 wounded, with the loss of her foremast, mainmast and bowsprit. Ville de Milan had probably about 30 killed and wounded, with Captain Renaud among the dead. She also lost her mainmast and mizzenmast. Though wounded, Ville de Milan's second officer, Capitaine de frégate Pierre Guillet took command. Three days were spent transferring a prize crew and prisoners, and patching up the ships, before the two got underway on 21 February.

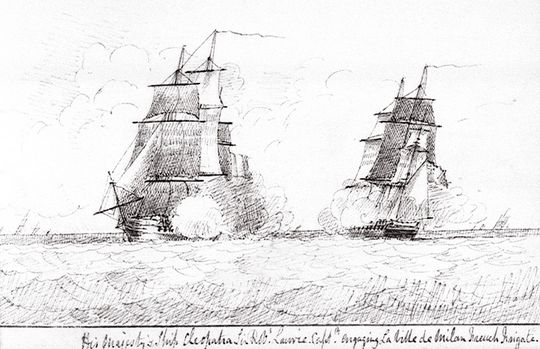
The chase of Ville de Milan by HMS Cleopatra

However on 23 February they were discovered by the 50-gun HMS Leander, under Captain John Talbot. The two vessels came together for support, but when Leander ran up to them, they hoisted French colours and separated. Talbot chased Cleopatra, brought her to with a shot and took possession. The freed crew reported the situation to Talbot, and left him to pursue the fleeing Ville de Milan. Talbot soon overtook her and she surrendered without a fight. Both were taken back to Halifax, where Ville de Milan was taken into service as HMS Milan, with Laurie as her captain. Laurie's engagement with the superior opponent had initially cost him his ship, but had rendered her easy prey to any other Royal Navy frigate in the vicinity. Had he not brought her to battle, Ville de Milan could have easily outsailed Leander or even engaged her on fairly equal terms. Instead the damage and losses incurred in breaking down Cleopatra had left her helpless to resist.

== British career ==
Milan was refitted at Portsmouth between 12 March and 4 April 1806 and commissioned that year under Sir Robert Laurie, who would command her for the next four years. She returned to the Halifax station for much of this time, but by 1812 was laid up in ordinary at Portsmouth. The conclusion of the Napoleonic Wars led to her being broken up at Chatham Dockyard in December 1815.
