= Sir John Laurie, 1st Baronet =

British stockbroker (1872–1954)

Sir John Dawson Laurie
- Born: 1872
- Died: 1954 (aged 81–82)
- Occupation: stockbroker

Sir John Dawson Laurie, 1st Baronet (12 September 1872 – 20 July 1954) was a British stockbroker who was Lord Mayor of London from 1941 to 1942.

He was the brother of Brigadier Sir Percy Laurie.

== See also ==
- Laurie baronets
