= USRC Eagle =

U.S. Revenue-Marine cutter (1793–1798)

History

United States
- Name: Eagle
- Operator: U.S. Revenue-Marine
- Cost: $1,247.98
- Launched: 1793
- Commissioned: 1793
- Decommissioned: 1798
- Home port: Savannah, Georgia
- Fate: Sold September 1799

General characteristics
- Class & type: Schooner
- Tons burthen: 55 65/95 (bm)
- Length: 55 ft 10 in
- Beam: 17 ft 6 in
- Draft: 6 ft 8 in
- Propulsion: Sail
- Complement: 4 officers, 4 enlisted, 2 boys
- Armament: Probably ten muskets with bayonets; twenty pistols; two chisels; one broad axe.

USRC Eagle was one of the first ten cutters operated by the United States Revenue-Marine, which later became the United States Revenue Cutter Service and later still became part of the United States Coast Guard.

Eagle has been often misidentified as the cutter Pickering, which was in fact not launched until 1798 (and so was not among the first ten cutters). Eagle was built in Savannah, Georgia, for service in that state's waters. Savannah remained her homeport throughout her career as a revenue cutter.

== Description ==
The only surviving documentation regarding the cutter Eagle's construction, dimensions, or her rig is a description written when she was sold in 1799:

... that the said ship or vessel has one deck and two masts, and that her length is fifty five feet ten inches, her breadth seventeen feet six inches, her depth six feet eight inches and that she measures fifty five 66/95 tons; that she is square sterned long quarter has Quarter Deck Badges and no Galleries and an Eagle head.

== Operational service ==
Some documentation does survive that provides a glimpse at her duties. Cutters typically were assigned to duty by the local collector of customs and as such they carried out a myriad of tasks and Eagle was no exception. She was assigned to enforce the quarantine restrictions imposed during the outbreak of yellow fever in Philadelphia in 1793. For that task she lay off Cockspur Island and prevented any vessel carrying infected persons from entering the Savannah harbor.

There are glimpses in the records of some of her adventures as a revenue cutter. She had a small hand in the establishment of the United States Navy when, in 1794, Eagle delivered woodcutting supplies to contractors on St. Simons Island. The contractors were to supply wood for the frigates recently authorized by the United States Congress, an authorization that marks the birth of the nation's second oldest sea-going service.

=== Lynx incident ===
In 1795, Eagle became involved in an international incident while on an unofficial voyage on South Carolina senator Pierce Butler's behalf. Butler convinced either acting captain Hendrick Fisher or local customs officials to transport a cargo of wool to his slave plantation on St. Simons Island using Eagle. While the vessel was sailing near Jekyll Island, it encountered the British Royal Navy sloop Lynx, captained by John Beresford. The sloop fired a shot across the cutter's bow as a signal for it to stop; Fisher responded by attempting to heave to, but Butler ordered him to continue ahead. Lynx subsequently began to open a continuous fire at Eagle, which sailed towards the shoal waters near the northern point of Jekyll Island. As Lynx had drawn too much water to continue the chase, Beresford ordered that the ship's pinnace and cutter, under Lieutenant Alex Skene's command, to pursue Eagle.

The two vessels quickly overtook Eagle and came on board, demanding to know why the ship had not come about when fired upon by Lynx. After learning the Eagle was a United States Revenue-Marine vessel, Skene and his men returned to their boats and went back to Lynx, allowing the Americans to continue unmolested. Once news of the encounter spread, the American public was outraged; in response to being questioned over the incident, Beresford stated that Lynx was outside the 12-nautical-mile (22 km; 14 mi) limit of U.S. territorial waters and noted that the cutter was not flying a flag. The American ensign was not displayed on Eagle for unexplained reasons but instead stored in the captain's cabin. Eagle did apparently display some sort of commissioning pennant, but it was not visible to Lynx.

== Fate ==
She was sold on 14 September 1799 for $595 (equivalent to $11,516 in 2025).

== Crew ==
John Howell, Master; 1793–1799.

- Hendrick Fisher, First Mate, 1793–1798 (?)
- John Wood, Second Mate, 1793–1794
- James Christian, Second Mate, 1794–1795
- Benjamin Forsyth, Second Mate, 1795–1798; promoted to First Mate in 1798 (?)
- William Duncan (died while a seaman on Eagle in 1797)
