= Russell baronets of Charlton Park (1832) =

Escutcheon of the Russell baronets of Charlton Park

The Russell baronetcy, of Charlton Park in the County of Gloucester, was created in the Baronetage of the United Kingdom on 9 April 1832 for William Russell, a Scottish physician. The 2nd Baronet represented Dover and Norwich in the House of Commons. The title became extinct on the death of the 3rd Baronet in 1915.

== Russell baronets, of Charlton Park (1832) ==
- Sir William Russell, 1st Baronet (1773–1839)
- Sir William Russell, 2nd Baronet (1822–1892)
- Sir William Russell, 3rd Baronet (1865–1915). He left no heir.

== Notes ==
Baronetage of the United Kingdom
| Preceded by Wrixon-Becher baronets | Russell baronets of Charlton Park; 9 April 1832 | Succeeded by Bayley baronets |
