= Jonathan Bailey (disambiguation) =

Jonathan Bailey (born 1988) is a British actor.

Jonathan Bailey may also refer to:

- Jonathan Bailey (bishop) (1940–2008), British bishop
- Jonathan W. Bailey (fl. 1979–2012), American retired National Oceanic and Atmospheric Administration rear admiral

== See also ==
- Jonathan Bailey House (disambiguation)
- Jonathan Bailey School, Whittier City School District, Whittier, California, USA
- John Bailey (disambiguation)
