= Emilius Bayley =

English cricketer, clergyman, and baronet

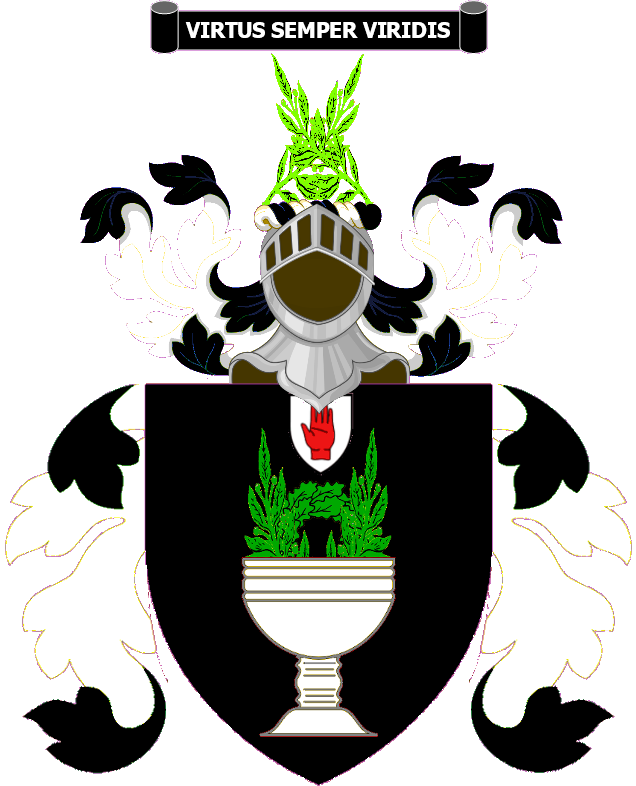
- The armorial achievement of the Laurie baronets of Bedford Square

Personal information
- Full name: John Robert Laurie Emilius Bayley
- Born: 16 May 1823; Bloomsbury, Middlesex
- Died: 4 December 1917 (aged 94); Moniaive, Dumfriesshire
- Batting: Right-handed
- Relatives: Sir John Bayley, 2nd Baronet (father); Lyttleton Bayley (brother)

Domestic team information
- Years: Team
- 1842–1843: Marylebone Cricket Club (MCC)
- 1843–1844: Kent

Career statistics
Competition	First-class
Matches	29
Runs scored	515
Batting average	12.56
100s/50s	0/1
Top score	50
Catches/stumpings	8/–
- Source: CricInfo, 26 March 2017

Sir John Robert Laurie Emilius Bayley, 3rd Baronet (16 May 1823 – 4 December 1917), later Sir Emilius Laurie, was an English clergyman, baronet and amateur cricketer. He was generally known by his middle-name Emilius and changed his surname to Laurie in 1887.

== Early life ==
Bayley was born at Bloomsbury in London in May 1823, the son of lawyer Sir John Bayley, 2nd Baronet and his first wife Charlotte. He is thought to have been given the name Emilius, by which he was generally known, after the name of one of his father's horses which won The Derby in 1823. His grandfather, Sir John Bayley, 1st Baronet, had the Bayley Baronetcy of Bedford Square created for him in 1834. This became known as the Laurie baronetcy after 1887.

Bayley was educated at Eton college where he was in the cricket team for four years and captain in 1840 and 1841. He set a record for the highest score in the Eton v Harrow match, scoring 152 at Lord's in 1841, a record which stood until 1904. He went up to Trinity College, Cambridge, matriculating in 1846 although he did not actually attend Trinity until 1861 and became a ten-year man and was awarded his Bachelor of Divinity in 1862.

== Cricketing career ==
Bayley played for Marylebone Cricket Club (MCC) against Cambridge University in 1842; his father was President of the club in 1844. He appeared nine times for Kent County Cricket Club between 1842 and 1844, first playing for the team before its foundation at the 1842 Canterbury Cricket Week. In total Bayley played in 29 first-class cricket matches, appearing 12 times for MCC and six for the Gentlemen of Kent as well as once for an England team. He was considered a "hard-hitting batsman", particularly on the leg-side, but his career as a churchman cut short his serious cricket career.

Bayley's younger brother, Lyttleton Bayley, also captained Eton at cricket and played for Kent.

== Churchman and baronet ==
After being ordained as a deacon at Oxford in 1846 and a priest in 1847, Bayley became the vicar of North Wheatley in Nottinghamshire from 1847 to 1849. He was a perpetual curate at Woburn, Bedfordshire between 1853 and 1856, of St George's church in Bloomsbury between 1856 and 1867 and of St John's church in Paddington from 1867 to 1888. He married Marianne Rice, the daughter of Edward Royd Rice, in 1855. The couple had five children, with two inheriting the Baronetcy.

- Lieutenant-Colonel Sir Claude Villiers Emilius Laurie Laurie, 4th Baronet (1855–1930)
- Blanche Alice May Laurie (1857–1945)
- Sir Wilfrid Emilius Laurie, 5th Baronet (1859–1936)
- Cecil Emilius Laurie (1862–1919)
- Arthur Emilius Laurie (1866–1874)

Bayley succeeded to the Baronetcy in 1871 on the death of his father, becoming the third Baronet. In 1886, he inherited Maxwelton House at Moniaive, Dumfriesshire through his mother's line. His great-uncle Admiral Sir Robert Laurie had died without an heir and the house had passed to Bayley's uncle John Minet Fector who had died in 1868 without an heir. As a condition of Robert Laurie's will, Bayley changed his surname to Laurie in February 1887.

Bayley died in 1917 at Maxwelton at the age of 94. At the time he was believed by Wisden to be the oldest living cricketer "of any note in England".

Coat of arms of Emilius Bayley

Crest
Two branches of laurel in saltire Proper.
Escutcheon
Sable a cup Argent with a garland between two laurel branches all issuing out of the same Vert.
Motto
Virtus Semper Viridis

== Bibliography ==
- Carlaw, Derek (2020). Kent County Cricketers, A to Z: Part One (1806–1914) (PDF). Cardiff: ACS.

Baronetage of the United Kingdom
Preceded by John Bayley	Baronet (of Bedford Square); 1871–1917	Succeeded by Claude Laurie
