= Amazon-class frigate (1773) =

1773 British fifth-rate frigates

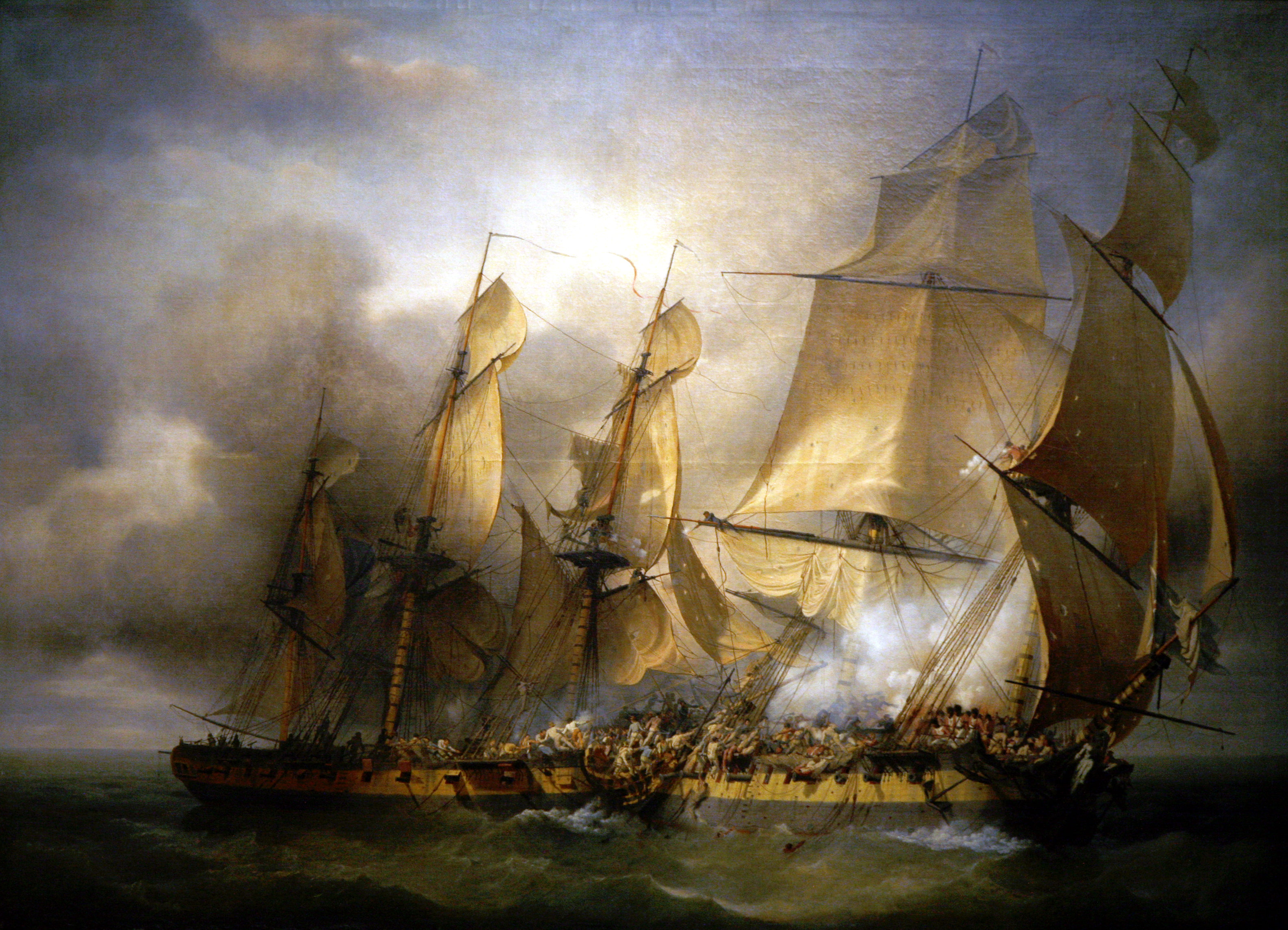
- Ambuscade (right) fighting Bayonnaise

Class overview
- Builders: Adams & Barnard, Deptford; James Betts, Mistleythorn; Joseph Graham, Harwich; Robert Batson & Co, Limehouse; Rotherhithe; Wyatt & Co. Buckler's Hard
- Operators: United Kingdom, France
- Built: 1773-1787
- In commission: 1773-1830
- Completed: 18

General characteristics
- Type: 32-gun fifth-rate frigate
- Tons burthen: 68929/94 (bm)
- Length: 126 ft 6 1/2 in (38.6 m) (overall); 104 ft 7 1/2 in (31.9 m) (keel)
- Beam: 35 ft 2 1/4 in (10.7 m)
- Draught: 8 ft (2.4 m)
- Depth of hold: 12 ft 1 1/2 in (3.7 m)
- Sail plan: Full-rigged ship
- Complement: 220
- Armament: Upper deck: 26 × 12-pounder guns; QD: 4 × 6-pounder guns + 4 × 18-pounder carronades; Fc: 2 × 6-pounder guns + 2 × 18-pounder carronades

The Amazon-class frigates of 1773, made up of 32-gun fifth rates with a main battery of 12-pounder guns. They were designed by the Surveyor of the Navy, John Williams during his employment by the Admiralty.

The class comprised eighteen ships; Amazon, Ambuscade and Thetis were launched in 1773; the second batch - Cleopatra, Amphion, Orpheus, Juno, Success, Iphigenia, Andromache, Syren, Iris, Greyhound, Meleager, Castor, Solebay, Terpsichore and Blonde - were launched in 1779 to 1787.
