= HMS Syren (1782) =

Frigate of the Royal Navy

History

Great Britain
- Name: HMS Syren
- Ordered: 3 January 1781
- Builder: James Betts, Mistleythorn
- Laid down: February 1781
- Launched: 24 September 1782
- Completed: By 16 December 1782
- Fate: Broken up in September 1822

General characteristics
- Class & type: 32-gun Amazon-class fifth-rate frigate
- Tons burthen: 6798/94 bm
- Length: 126 ft (38 m) (gundeck); 103 ft 10 in (31.65 m) (keel)
- Beam: 35 ft 1.75 in (10.7125 m)
- Depth of hold: 12 ft 2 in (3.71 m)
- Sail plan: Full-rigged ship
- Crew: 220
- Armament: Upper deck: 26 × 12-pounder guns; QD: 4 × 6-pounder guns + 4 × 18-pounder carronades; Fc: 2 × 6-pounder guns + 2 × 18-pounderr carronades

HMS Syren was a 32-gun Amazon-class fifth-rate frigate of the Royal Navy. She served during the American War of Independence, the French Revolutionary, and Napoleonic Wars. Among her more famous midshipmen were the future Rear-Admiral Peter Puget, and John Pasco, Nelson's signal officer at the Battle of Trafalgar.

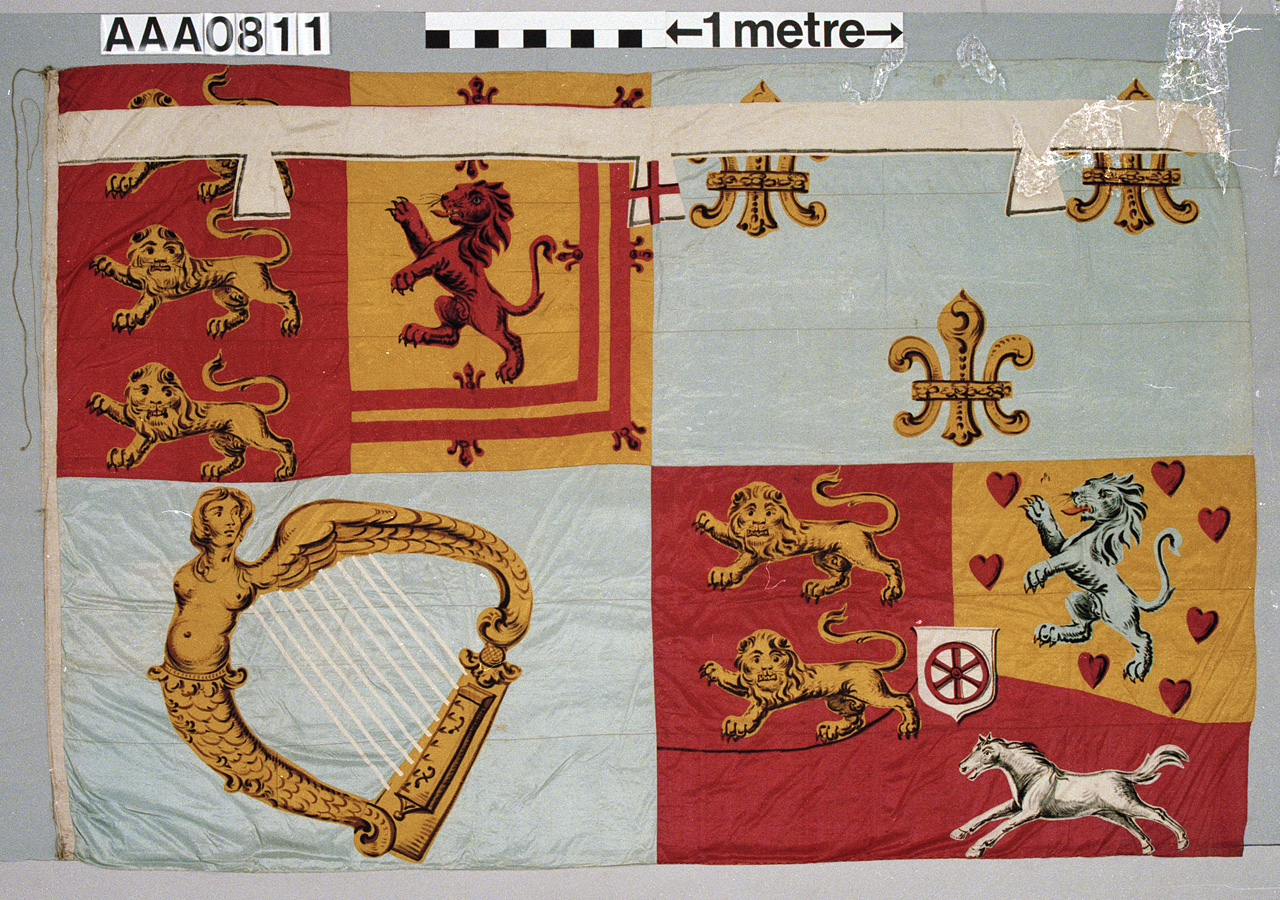
The Duke of York's Standard flown by Syren on his 1793 expedition to Flanders
