= HMS Andromache (1781) =

Amazon class frigate of the Royal Navy

- Inboard profile plan of Andromache

History

Great Britain
- Name: HMS Andromache
- Namesake: Andromache
- Ordered: 1 February 1780
- Builder: William Barnard, Deptford
- Laid down: June 1781
- Launched: 17 November 1781
- Completed: 4 January 1782
- Fate: Broken up in 1811
- Notes: Participated in: Battle of the Saintes

General characteristics
- Class & type: 32-gun Amazon-class fifth-rate frigate
- Tons burthen: 684 12/94 (bm)
- Length: 126 ft 2 in (38.5 m) (gundeck); 104 ft (31.7 m) (keel)
- Beam: 35 ft 2 in (10.7 m)
- Depth of hold: 12 ft 2 in (3.71 m)
- Sail plan: Full-rigged ship
- Complement: 220
- Armament: UD: 26 × 12-pounder guns; QD: 4 × 6-pounder guns + 4 × 18-pounder carronades; Fc: 2 × 6-pounder guns + 2 × 18-pounder carronades

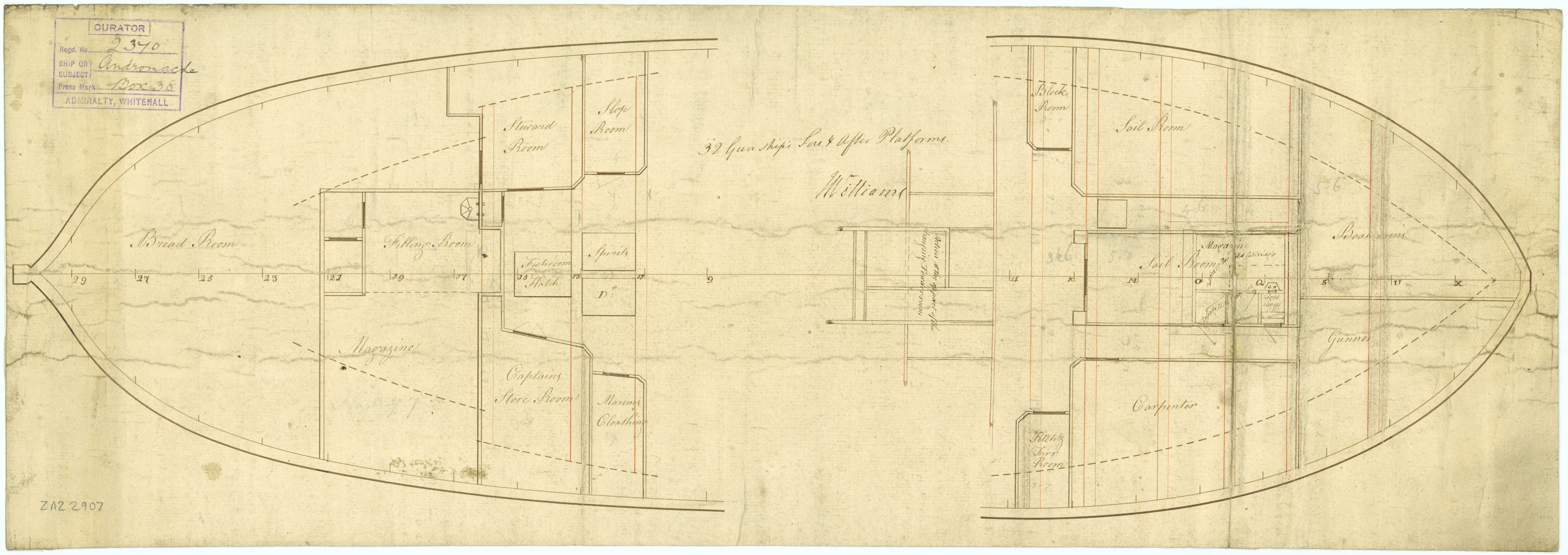
Lower deck plan of Andromache

HMS Andromache was a 32-gun Amazon-class fifth-rate frigate of the Royal Navy. She was launched in 1781 and served for 29 years until she was broken up in 1811.

== Construction ==
Andromache was ordered on 1 February 1780 and was laid down on June 1780 by William Barnard of Deptford Dockyard. She was launched on 17 November 1781 and was completed by February of the following year. The ship is named after Andromache in Greek mythology.

== Career ==
=== West Indies ===
In 1782 under the command of Captain George Anson Byron, Andromache headed a look-out squadron during the Battle of Saintes. Alongside HMS Agamemnon and HMS Magnificent, they provided vital information to Admiral Sir George Rodney by reporting all of Comte de Grasse's movements at Fort Royal.

On 17 October, 1793, under command of Capt. Jones, she was impressing American sailors off merchantmen in the Bay of Cádiz.

In 1795, Andromache sailed through a hurricane off Bermuda where she was completely dismasted and suffered severe damage.

=== Mediterranean ===
In 1796 under the command of Charles Manfield, Andromache engaged a 24-gun Algerine corsair after it mistook her for a Portuguese frigate. The corsair lost 64 crew before the vessel surrendered.

=== North America ===
In 1799, Andromache sailed to North America where she would patrol the coast. Two years later in 1801, Andromache and another Amazon-class frigate, HMS Cleopatra, carried out an attack on a 30-ship Spanish convoy in the Bay of Levita, Cuba. On approach, both vessels were heavily damaged by grapeshot but they were able to successfully capture a single Spanish gunboat.

== Fate ==
After serving for nearly 30 years, Andromache was broken up in 1811 at Deptford Dockyard.
