= Sir Robert Laurie, 5th Baronet =

Scottish politician

General Sir Robert Laurie Bt MP
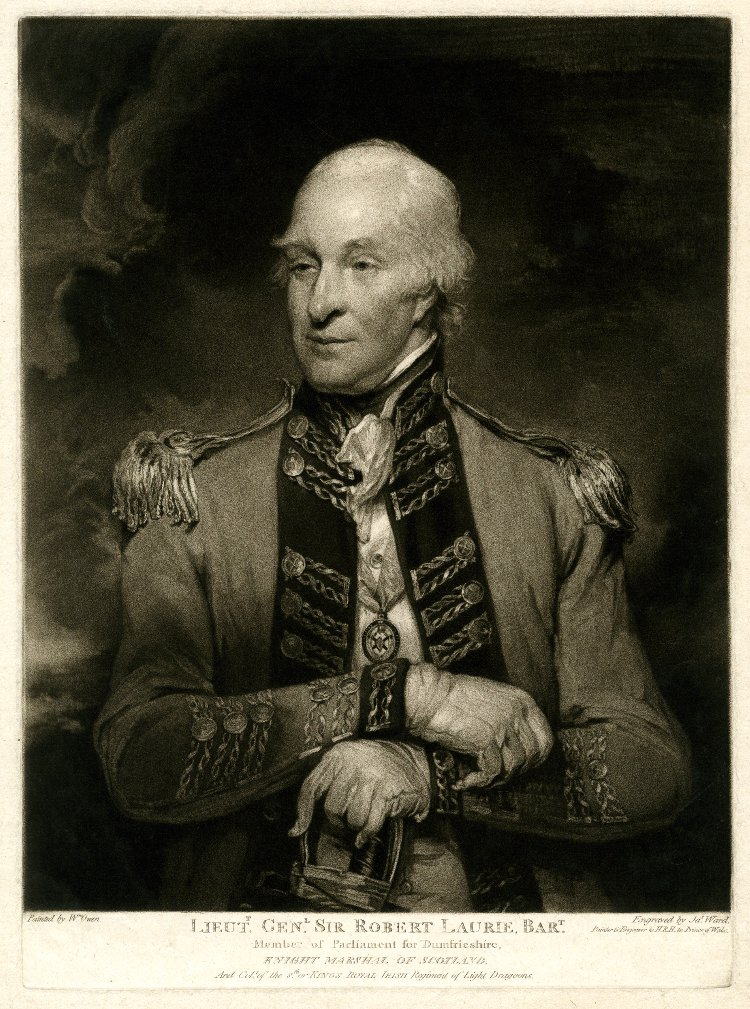
- Born: c. 1738
- Died: 10 September 1804

Sir Robert Laurie, 5th Baronet (c. 1738 – 10 September 1804) was a Scottish soldier and politician who sat in the House of Commons from 1774 to 1804.

Laurie was the only son of Sir Robert Laurie, 4th Baronet and his wife Christian Erskine, daughter of Charles Erskine, Lord Tinwald. He succeeded his father in the baronetcy on 28 April 1779.

He joined the army in 1762 and was captain in the 71st Foot. In 1765 he was a captain in the 7th Dragoon Guards and in 1771 a major.

In the 1774 general election he was returned as Member of Parliament for Dumfriesshire. Also in 1779 he became lieutenant-colonel in the 16th Light Dragoons and joint surveyor general of window and house tax in Scotland. He was re-elected MP for Dumfriesshire in 1780 and 1784. In 1785 he was appointed Knight Marischal of Scotland but lost his position as surveyor general of window and house tax in 1789. He was made full General in 1803.

Laurie was extremely irregular in his attendance in Parliament, but retained his seat until his death on 10 September 1804. He had married firstly Elizabeth Maria Ruthven, daughter of James, 5th Lord Ruthven on 18 July 1763, with whom he had a son and a daughter. Having divorced his first wife in 1774, he had married secondly Judith Wollaston, daughter of Captain Hatley and widow of Robert Wollaston of Ipswich, Suffolk on 25 April 1778. He was succeeded by his son Sir Robert Laurie, 6th Baronet.

== Sources ==
- National Portrait Gallery Sir Robert Laurie, 5th Bt by James Ward

Parliament of Great Britain
Preceded by Lt Gen Archibald Douglas of Kirkton	Member of Parliament for Dumfriesshire; 1774 –1801	Succeeded by Parliament of the United Kingdom
Parliament of the United Kingdom
Preceded by Parliament of Great Britain	Member of Parliament for Dumfriesshire; 1801–1804	Succeeded by Sir William Johnstone Hope
Honorary titles
Preceded by James Erskine, Lord Alva	Knight Marischal; 1785–1804	Succeeded by William Hay, 17th Earl of Erroll
Baronetage of Nova Scotia
Preceded by Robert Laurie	Baronet (of Maxwelton); 1779–1804	Succeeded by Robert Laurie
