= Sir John Bayley, 2nd Baronet =

English cricketer and baronet

Coat of arms of Sir John Bayley, 2nd Baronet
Crest On a mount vert, behind a wall argent, a lion rampant argent. Escutcheon Quarterly gules and erminois, on a fess azure three martlets or, in the 1st and 4th quarters a lion rampant argent

Sir John Edward George Bayley, 2nd Baronet (23 December 1793 – 23 December 1871) was an English baronet and amateur cricketer.

Born in London, he was the son of Sir John Bayley, 1st Baronet and his wife Elizabeth, the youngest daughter of John Markett. Bayley was called to the bar by the Inner Temple in 1835 and went then to the Northern Circuit. He succeeded his father as baronet in 1841.

Bayley played from 1817 to 1832. Mainly associated with Marylebone Cricket Club (MCC), he made 11 known appearances in important matches. He represented the Gentlemen in the Gentlemen v Players series.

In 1822, he married firstly Charlotte, the daughter of John Minet Fector the elder. After her death in 1854, Bayley remarried Selina Marley. He died at Kensington in 1871 and was succeeded in the baronetcy by his son Emilius. The couple's second son was Hon. Lyttleton Holyoake Bayley.

Baronetage of the United Kingdom
Preceded by John Bayley	Baronet (of Bedford Square); 1841–1871	Succeeded by John Laurie
