= John Walker Baily =

John Walker Baily (9 January 1809 – 4 March 1873), was an English archaeologist.

Baily was the brother of Charles Baily, and was born 9 January 1809, and died 4 March 1873. He was head of the firm of William Baily & Sons, and master of the Ironmongers' Company in 1862–1863. He is chiefly known to archaeologists as having formed an important collection of Romano-British and medieval remains unearthed by excavations in the City of London during the years 1862–1872. This collection was purchased in 1881 by the Corporation of London for their museum of City antiquities. In the same year his collection of arms and armour, formed 1835–1845, became the property of the Baron de Cosson, of Chertsey.
