= Sir John Bayley, 1st Baronet =

English judge

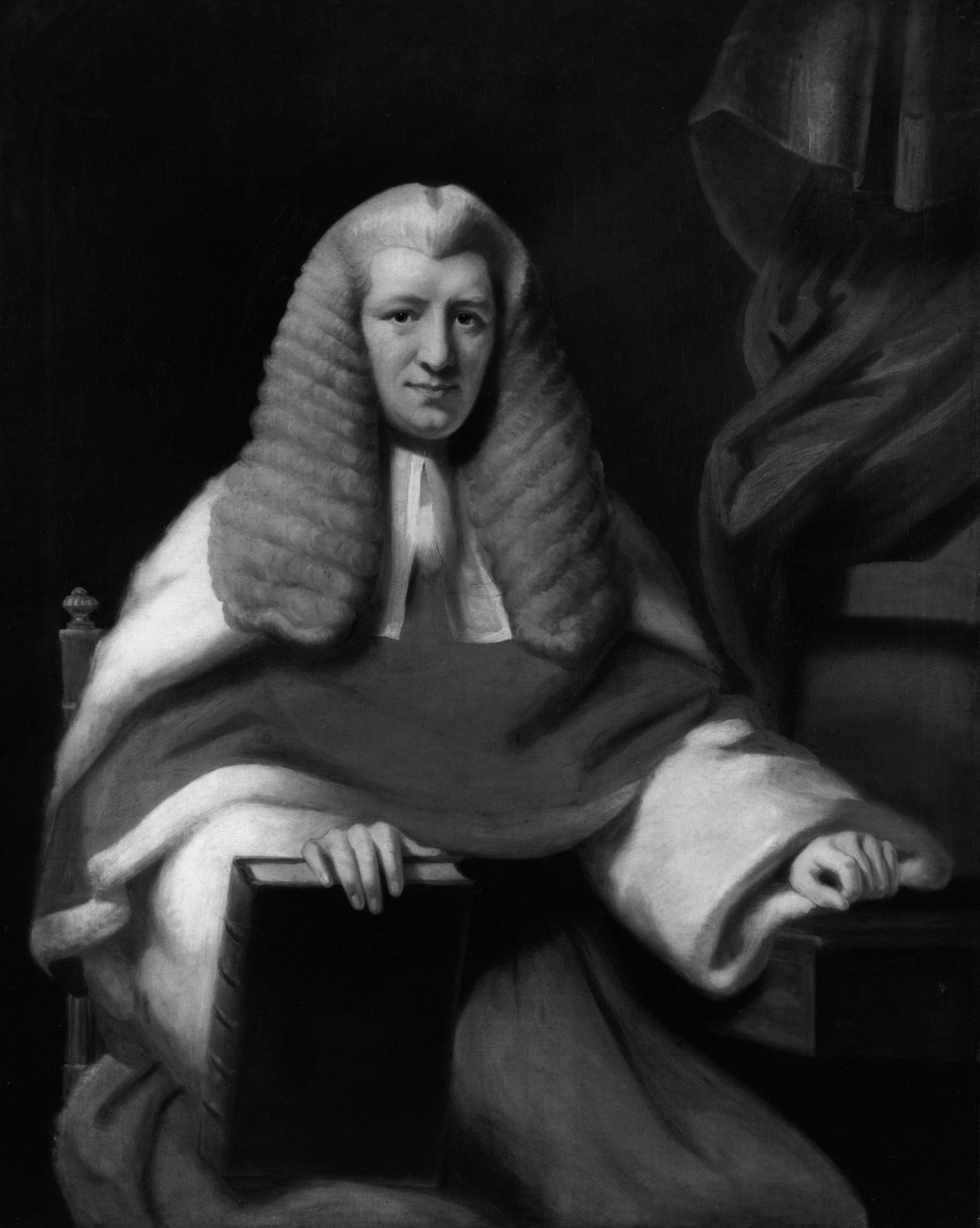
Sir John Bayley, 1st Baronet

Sir John Bayley, 1st Baronet, PC (3 August 1763 – 10 October 1841), was an English judge.

== Life ==
Bayley was the second son of John Bayley and Sarah his wife, the granddaughter of Dr. White Kennet, bishop of Peterborough. He was born at Elton, Huntingdonshire, on 3 August 1763, and educated at Eton. Though nominated for King's College, Cambridge, he did not go up to the university, and was admitted to Gray's Inn on 12 November 1783. After practising some time as a special pleader, he was called to the bar on 22 June 1792, and went the home circuit. In 1799 he became a serjeant-at-law, and was for some time recorder of Maidstone.

In May 1808 he was made a judge of the King's Bench, in the place of Sir Soulden Lawrence, and was knighted on the 11th of the same month. After sitting in this court for more than twenty-two years, he was at his own request removed to the Court of Exchequer in November 1830. He resigned his seat on the bench in February 1834, and was admitted to the privy council on 5 March 1834. He was created a baronet of Bedford Square, in the County of Middlesex on 15 March 1834. By his quickness of apprehension, his legal knowledge, and his strict impartiality, Sir John Bayley was peculiarly adapted for judicial office.

The ease and pleasure with which he got through his work caused M. Cotte, the French advocate, to exclaim, 'Il s'amuse à juger.' The most memorable case which came before Sir John in his judicial capacity was the action for libel brought in 1819 by the attorney-general against Richard Carlile for the republication of Thomas Paine's The Age of Reason and Elihu Palmer's Principles of Nature.

Bayley jointly owned three sugar plantations in British Guiana and Dominica, and when the British government emancipated the slaves in the 1830s, he and his partners were compensated to the tune of over £20,000 each for over 400 slaves in their possession.

He died, aged 78, at the Vine House near Sevenoaks, on 10 October 1841.

== Family ==
By his wife Elizabeth, the daughter of John Markett of Meopham Court Lodge, co. Kent, he had three sons and three daughters. His eldest son, Sir John Bayley, 2nd Baronet, was a noted cricketer. The 3rd baronet, the Rev. Sir John Laurie Emilius Bayley, was his grandson.

== Works ==
- A Short Treatise on the Law of Bills of Exchange, Cash Bills, and Promissory Notes, 1789.
- Lord Raymond's Reports and Entries in the King's Bench and Common Pleas in the Reigns of William, Anne, George I and II, 4th edition, 1790.
- The Book of Common Prayer, with Notes on the Epistles, 1813.
- The Prophecies of Christ and Christian Times, selected from the Old and New Testament, and arranged according to the periods in which they were pronounced, by a Layman, edited by Rev. H. Clissold, 1828.

Coat of arms of Sir John Bayley, 1st Baronet
Crest On a mount vert, behind a wall argent, a lion rampant argent. Escutcheon Quarterly gules and erminois, on a fess azure three martlets or, in the 1st and 4th quarters a lion rampant argent

Baronetage of the United Kingdom
New creation	Baronet (of Bedford Square); 1834–1841	Succeeded by John Bayley
