= Sir Robert Laurie, 4th Baronet =

Scottish politician (1708–1779)

Sir Robert Laurie 4th Baronet (1708–1779) of Maxwelton, Dumfries was a Scottish politician who sat in the House of Commons from 1738 to 1741

Laurie was the eldest son of Sir Walter Laurie, 3rd Baronet, of Maxwelton, and his first wife Jean Nisbet of Dean, Midlothian. He succeeded his father to the baronetcy on 23 November 1731. He married Christian Erskine, eldest daughter of Charles Erskine, of Alva, Clackmannanshire, and Tinwald, Dumfries, on 4 February 1733.

Laurie was brought in by his father-in-law, Charles Erskine, as Member of Parliament for Dumfries Burghs at a by-election on 19 June 1738. He voted with the Administration on the Spanish convention in 1739 and on the place bill in 1740. He did not stand at the 1741 British general election.

Laurie died on 28 April 1779 leaving a son and a daughter. He was succeeded in the baronetcy by his son Robert.

Parliament of Great Britain
| Preceded by William Kirkpatrick | Member of Parliament for Dumfries Burghs; 1738–1741 | Succeeded by Lord John Johnstone |
Regnal titles
| Preceded by Walter Laurie | Baronet (of Mexwelton); 1731-1779 | Succeeded by Robert Laurie |
