= John Baillie (minister) =

Rev John Baillie (1741–1806) was a British minister of the Secession Church.

== Life ==
Baillie was born in 1741, and came to note as one of the nine students involved in the Associate (Burgher) Divinity Hall in 1765.

In 1767 he became minister of the Carliol-Street meeting-house (United Secession Church) at Newcastle-upon-Tyne. His convivial habits having led him into irregularities peculiarly inconsistent with his profession, he was suspended in 1784.

He then assisted William Tinwell, the author of A Treatise of Practical Arithmetic, in conducting a school. Afterwards he lectured in a schoolroom in St. Nicholas's churchyard at Newcastle, and in 1797 his friends fitted up the chapel at the Old Postern Gate for his use. He was in pecuniary difficulties for several years previous to his death, which occurred at Gateshead on 12 December 1806.

== Family ==
Baillie married Frances (1778–1801), a teacher in Newcastle, almost 40 years his junior.

== Works ==
He published several detached sermons, such as:

- A Funeral Discourse on the Death of the Papacy, delivered before a crowded audience, Newcastle, 1798, 8vo,
- A Funeral Sermon occasioned by the death of Frances Baillie, his daughter, who kept a school at Newcastle, and who died in 1801 at the age of twenty-three.
- His other works are:
1. A Course of Lectures upon various antient and interesting Prophecies; tending to strengthen the faith and enliven the hopes of believers in the Divine Saviour, to whom all the Prophets bare witness. Lecture i. Haggai ii. 6-10, Newcastle, 1784, 8vo.
2. An Impartial History of the Town and County of Newcastle-upon-Tyne and its Vicinity (anon.), Newcastle, 1801, 8vo.
3. History of the French War, from 1791 to 1802, 8vo.

He also assisted in writing a History of Egypt.
