= Jack Bailey (footballer, born 1901) =

English footballer

Personal information
- Full name: John Bailey
- Date of birth: 1901
- Place of birth: Grays, England
- Positions: Inside right; inside left

Senior career*
Years	Team	Apps	(Gls)
1926–1930	Southend United	78	(22)
1931	Thames	11	(1)
- * Club domestic league appearances and goals

John Bailey (born 1901, date of death unknown) was a footballer who played as an inside forward for Southend United and Thames in the Football League.
