= Robert Laurie (journalist) =

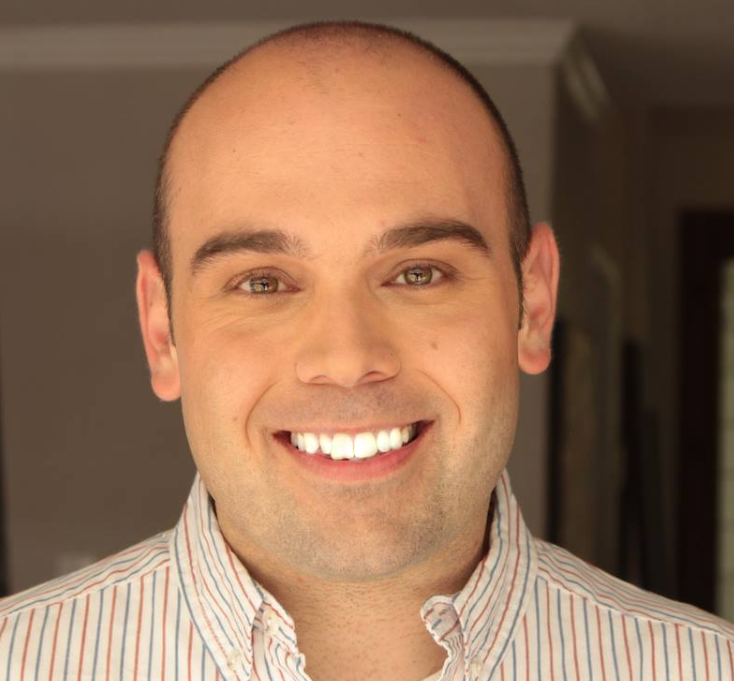
- Occupations: Journalist, television travel expert, anchor
- Known for: Take Off! with The Savvy Stews, The Jet Set
- Notable work: Planely Speaking: Inflight Insight from Thirty Thousand Feet
- Website: bobbylaurie.com

Robert Laurie (also known as Bobby Laurie) is a journalist, television travel expert, the co-host of The Jet Set as well as a traffic anchor and reporter at iHeartMedia and ABC7.

== Career ==
Laurie started his career in the travel industry in 2005, working as a flight attendant at US Airways. After 6 months, he held various other positions, notably reaching the post of an analyst focused on in-flight policies.

In 2009, Laurie joined the media by started a travel blog. His blog quickly became popular making him a go-to expert in the field. Later his most-read articles were published as in a book titled Planely Speaking: Inflight Insight from Thirty Thousand Feet.

He was the producer of the 2014 Discovery Network series, Take Off! with The Savvy Stews that aired on Destination America. The series was themed on cultural experiences of Laurie and his colleague on their world travels as flight attendants.

He also spent two years working at the morning show, The Daily Buzz and another three years at The Better Show.

Today, in addition to co-hosting The Jet Set and his work as a traffic anchor in Washington, D.C., Laurie works as a freelance journalist for Conde Nast Traveler, Fodors and SmarterTravel supplying them with original reporting on the industry.

== Books ==
- Planely Speaking: Inflight Insight from Thirty Thousand Feet.
- Paris. First Class. International. A Quick Start Guide to The Career of a Flight Attendant and How to Become One.
- Love, Grandma - Traditional and Favorite Italian Recipes.
- The Jet Set on a Budget: Family Travel.
