= Laurie baronets =

There have been three baronetcies for persons with the surname Laurie, one in the Baronetage of Nova Scotia and two in the Baronetage of the United Kingdom. One creation is extant as of 2026.

- Laurie baronets of Maxwelton (1685)
- Bayley baronets of Updown House (1834): later Laurie baronets of Bedford Square
- Laurie baronets of Sevenoakes (1942): see Sir John Laurie, 1st Baronet (1872–1954)
