= HMS Thisbe (1783) =

Enterprise-class Royal Navy frigate

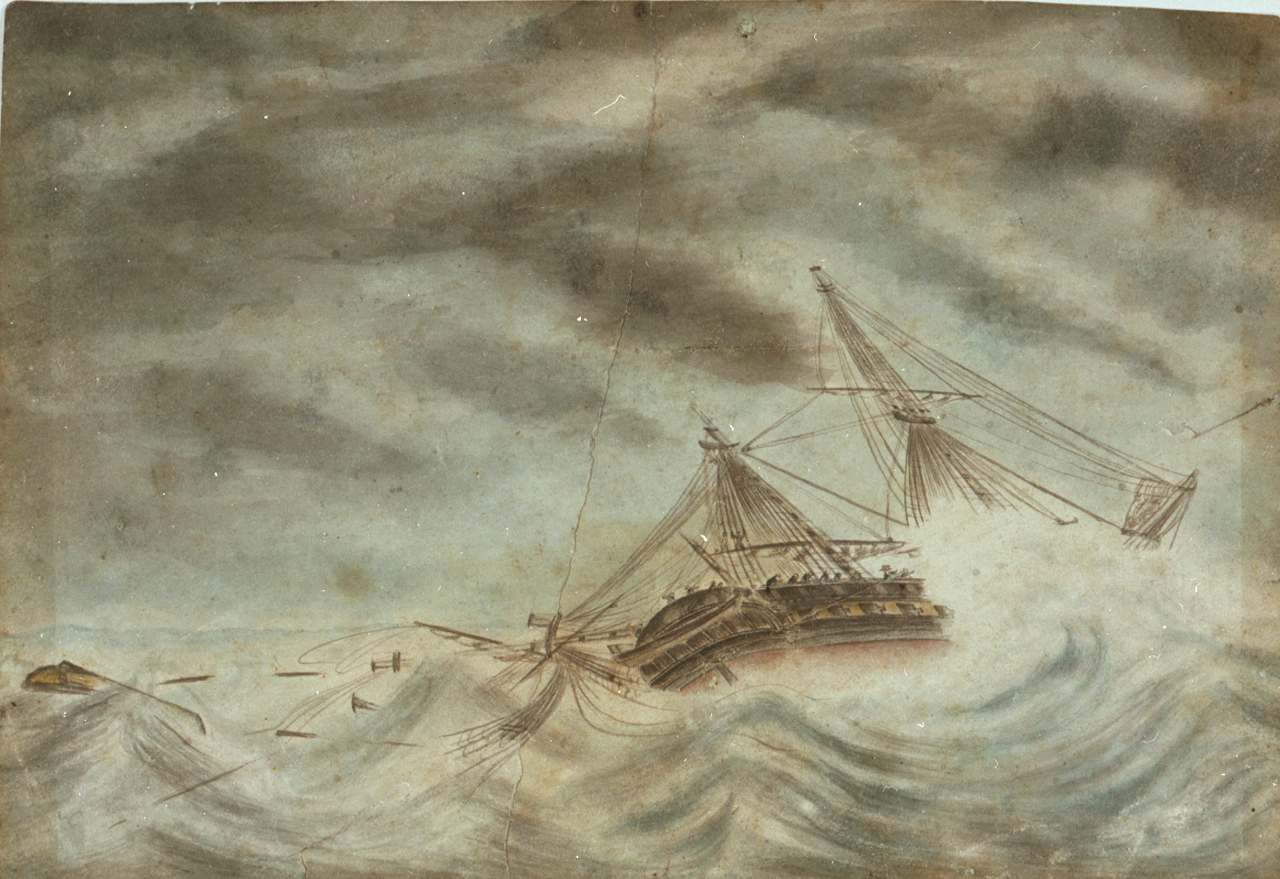
- Thisbe at sea in a hurricane on 23 August 1798

History

Great Britain
- Name: HMS Thisbe
- Ordered: 23 February 1782
- Builder: Thomas King, Dover
- Laid down: September 1782
- Launched: 25 November 1783
- Completed: 19 April 1784
- Commissioned: December 1787
- Honours and awards: Naval General Service Medal with clasp "Egypt"
- Fate: Sold to be broken up, 9 August 1815

General characteristics
- Class & type: Enterprise-class sixth-rate frigate
- Tons burthen: 59657/94 (bm)
- Length: 120 ft 6 in (36.73 m) (gundeck); 99 ft 5 3/8 in (30.312 m) (keel)
- Beam: 33 ft 7 in (10.24 m)
- Depth of hold: 11 ft 0 in (3.35 m)
- Sail plan: Full-rigged ship
- Complement: 200 officers and men
- Armament: Gundeck: 24 × 9-pounder guns; QD: 4 × 6-pounder guns + 4 × 18-pounder carronades; Fc: 2 × 18-pounder carronades

HMS Thisbe was a 28-gun Enterprise-class sixth-rate frigate of the Royal Navy.

== Service ==
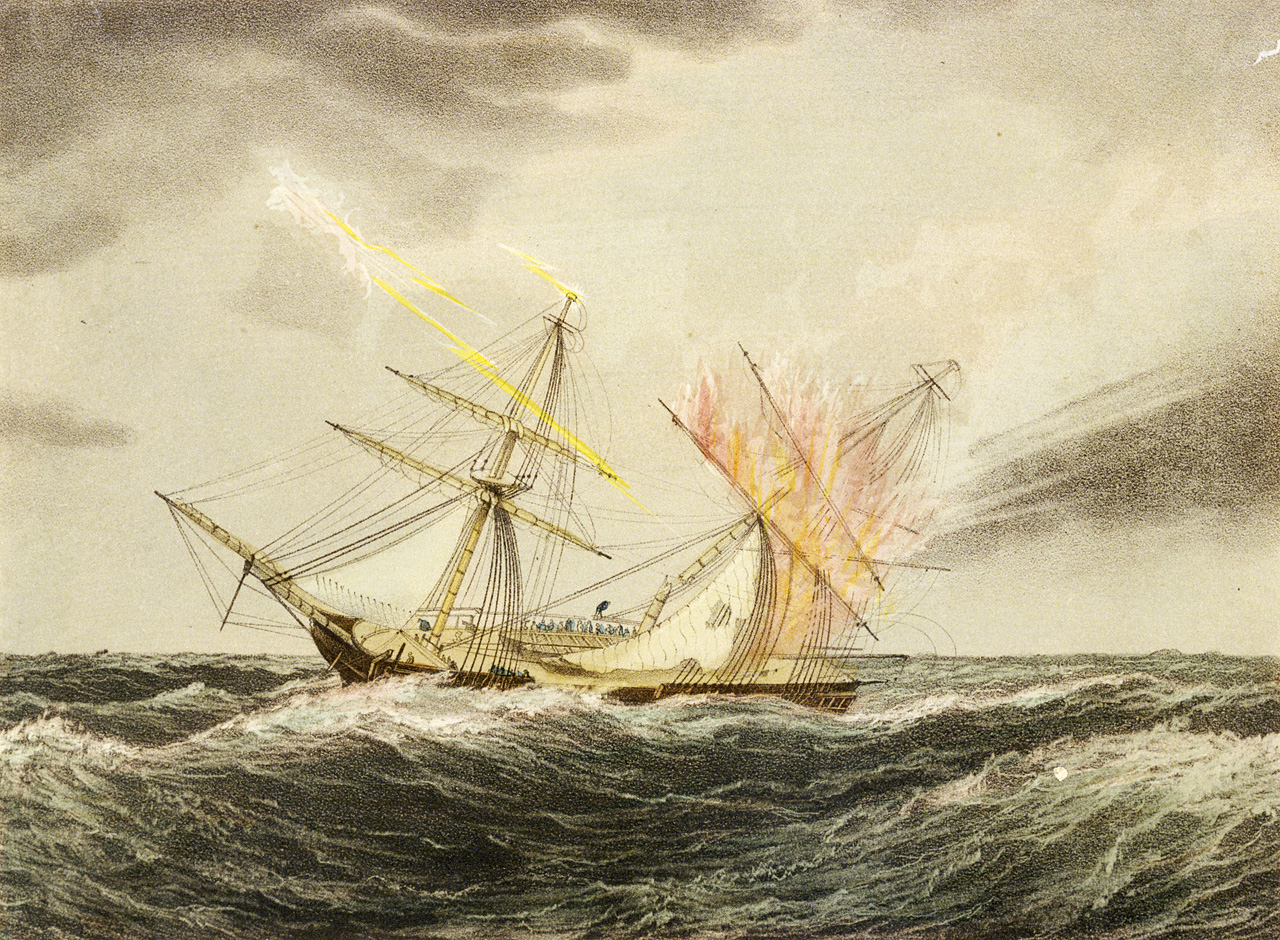
Thisbe on fire on 4 January 1786, caused by a lightning strike. Nicholas Matthew Condy. A second lightning bolt on the same day had set her Main sail, Top on fire

Thisbe was first commissioned in December 1787 under the command of Captain George Robertson. Because Thisbe served in the navy's Egyptian campaign (8 March to 2 September 1801), her officers and crew qualified for the clasp "Egypt" to the Naval General Service Medal that the Admiralty authorized in 1850 to all surviving claimants. (Note: A first-class share of the prize money awarded in April 1823 was worth £34 2s 4d; a fifth-class share, that of a seaman, was worth 3s 11½d. The amount was small as the total had to be shared between 79 vessels and the entire army contingent.)

In 1804 Thisbe was in the Mediterranean. There she captured a privateer that she sent into Corfu. Thisbe also recaptured Wight, Ford, master, which had been sailing from Zant to London when the privateer had captured her. Wight arrived at Portsmouth in September.
