= William Hicks (Royal Navy officer) =

British naval officer (1778–1874)

- Born: 16 December 1788; St Columb, Cornwall
- Died: 11 January 1874 (aged 85); Sturmer, Essex
- Military career
- Allegiance: United Kingdom
- Branch: Royal Navy
- Service years: 1803–1819
- Rank: Lieutenant
- Units: HMS Conqueror
- Conflicts: French Revolutionary Wars; Napoleonic Wars; Battle of Trafalgar

Lieutenant William Hicks (1788–1874) was a British Royal Navy officer who at the age of 16, was an aide-de-camp to Captain Israel Pellew of HMS Conqueror at the Battle of Trafalgar. His vivid accounts describing the surrender of Admiral Villeneuve's flagship Bucentaure were published in The Times. His uniform is preserved at The National Maritime Museum, Greenwich, and is said to be the only one of its type from that era.

== At Trafalgar ==
As midshipman at the Battle of Trafalgar (21 October 1805), he served under Captain Israel Pellew on HMS Conqueror. Letters from him also preserved in the family show that the carnage he saw at Trafalgar made a deep and lasting impact. He wrote:

"I had a merciful escape in the fight with the (Spanish ship) Santissima Trinidad. I saw a grape shot which struck a canister case. I took it up and put it in my pocket. Turning round I saw the first lieutenant and sixth lieutenant lying close by me. I ran to them, saying, I hope you're not seriously hurt, and lifting Mr Lloyd's head the blood gushed into my shoes. Both were dead."

Describing the surrender of the French flagship Bucentaure he wrote...

"We engaged her single-handed for an hour, and she struck to us; after her colours were hauled down two guns from her starboard side began to play on us. Sir Israel Pellew, thinking that they were disposed to renew the fight, ordered the guns which could bear on her foremast to knock it away, and her masts were cut away successfully in a few minutes. The officers of the French ship waving their handkerchiefs in sign of surrender, we sent a cutter and took possession."

== Uniform ==
His pre-1815 pattern lieutenant's uniform is on display in the National Maritime Museum. It was donated by a descendant, having been carefully preserved by succeeding generations of the Hicks family. There are no other examples of this type of uniform anywhere in the world.

== Post-war career ==
In 1819 he left the Navy and trained for priesthood in the Church of England. In 1829 he became Rector of St Mary's, Sturmer, in Essex, where he served for 44 years, until his death in 1874. A memorial plaque in the church, erected by parishioners, commemorates 'William Hicks, our Vicar who fought at Trafalgar.'

== Family ==
He was the son of Richard Hicks and Martha Peter (of Padstow) in the Parish of St Columb Major. In 1823 he married Charlotte Willimot, the daughter of Alderman Willimot of Cambridge, and had six children.

His younger brother, Richard Hicks also fought in the French Wars of 1793–1815, serving in the army in Wellington's Peninsular campaigns.
