= Action of 18 June 1793 =

1793 action of the War of the First Coalition

Coordinates: 50.215°N 3.582°W

- Part of the War of the First Coalition
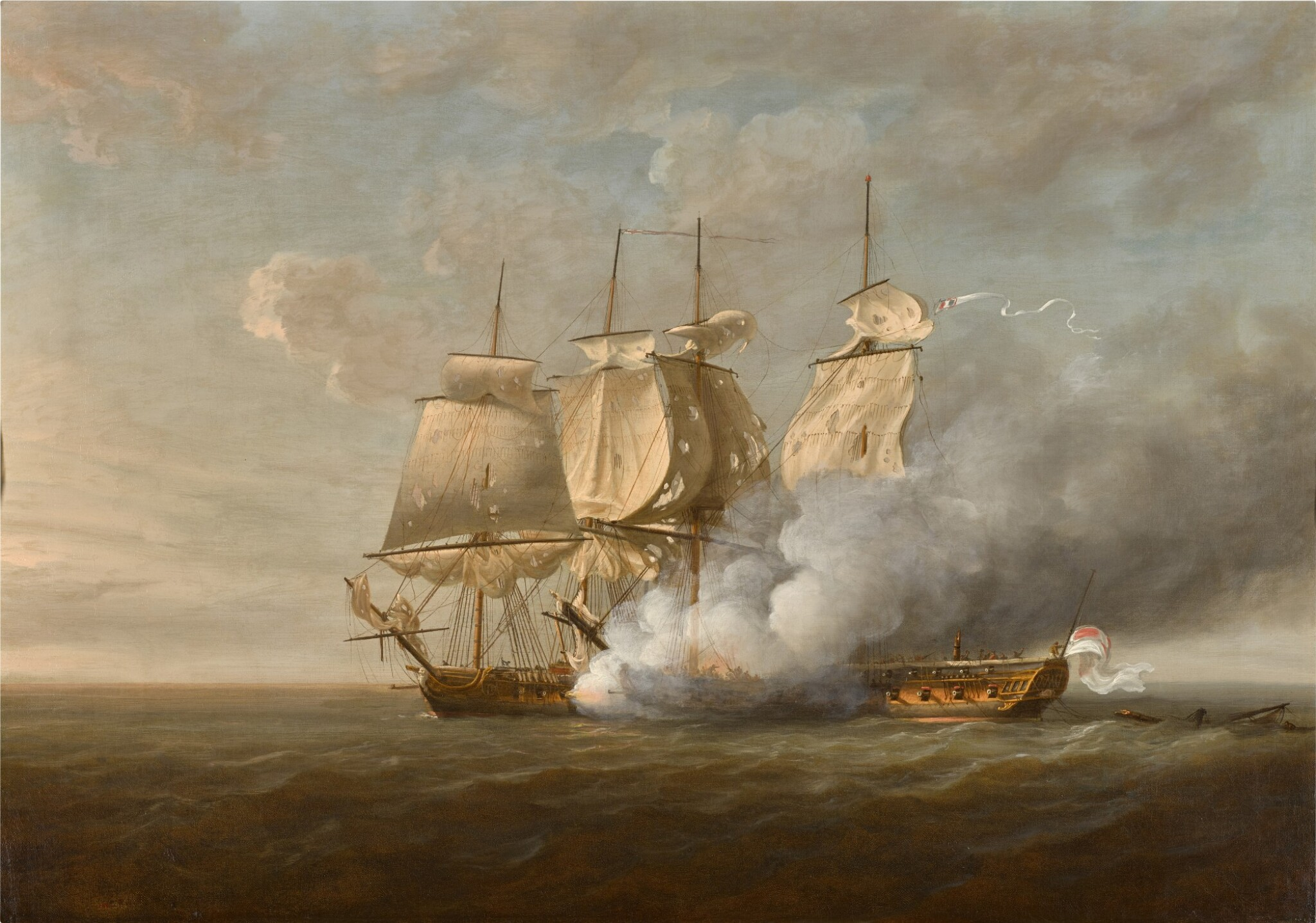
- Painting of the action by Nicholas Pocock
Date	18 June 1793
Location	Off Start Point, English Channel
Result	British victory

Belligerents
Great Britain	France

Commanders and leaders
Edward Pellew	Jean Mullon †

Strength
1 frigate	1 frigate

Casualties and losses
23 killed 27 wounded	63 killed and wounded 250 captured 1 frigate captured

The action of 18 June 1793 was an encounter between British and French frigates during the War of the First Coalition. The action occurred off Start Point in Devon, when the British frigate HMS Nymphe encountered and chased the French frigate Cléopâtre. During the previous month, Cléopâtre and another frigate, Sémillante, had been successfully raiding British merchant shipping in the English Channel and Eastern Atlantic from their base at Cherbourg-en-Cotentin. In response, the British frigates Nymphe and HMS Venus had been ordered to intercept and defeat the French frigates and on 27 May Venus and Sémillante fought an inconclusive engagement off Cape Finisterre.

On 17 June, Nymphe was cruising alone off the Devon coast under Captain Edward Pellew when a sail appeared to the south east. Closing to investigate, Pellew rapidly identified the ship as Cléopâtre and gave chase, the French frigate initially fleeing but Captain Jean Mullon then turning to fight as Nymphe began to overtake his ship. At 06:15, with both crews cheering loudly, the frigates exchanged broadsides, the action lasting 50 minutes. Both ships fought hard, but at 07:10 the British crew were able to successfully board the French frigate and haul down the tricolour. Mullon was mortally wounded in the engagement, and his crew lost 63 casualties compared to 50 on board Nymphe. Pellew returned to Britain with his prize, the first major French warship captured during the conflict, and was proclaimed a hero.

== Background ==
In February 1793, the National Convention that governed the French Republic expanded the ongoing French Revolutionary Wars by declaring war on Great Britain and the Dutch Republic. The light vessels of the British Royal Navy had been preparing for the conflict for several months, having concentrated in June 1792 at Spithead in anticipation of the outbreak of war. These ships were stationed in large numbers in the North Sea and the English Channel to defend British maritime trade against the threat of French commerce raiders operating from the French Channel ports. The French Navy by contrast was riven with the same social divisions that had divided France in the aftermath of the French Revolution four years earlier. This had led to the collapse of the professional officer corps and the elimination of the rank of trained seamen-gunners on the grounds of elitism, resulting in a dearth of experience both in seamanship and naval combat.

To counter their disadvantages, the French Navy operated several well-armed frigates from their Channel and Atlantic ports to intercept and disrupt the movement of British trade. Two of the most successful vessels in the early months of the war were the frigates Cléopâtre and Sémillante under Captains Jean Mullon and Gaillard respectively and based at Cherbourg-en-Cotentin on the Cotentin Peninsula. In response to the depredations of French raiders, the Royal Navy stationed two frigates at Falmouth. The selected ships were HMS Venus under Captain Jonathan Faulknor and HMS Nymphe under Captain Edward Pellew. Pellew was a highly experienced officer who had been commended for his service in the American Revolutionary War, during which he fought at the Battle of Valcour Island on Lake Champlain, as an engineering officer at the Battle of Saratoga and later in European waters in command of a frigate. He was accompanied on board Nymphe by his younger brother Commander Israel Pellew, who was at the time an unemployed reserve officer enlisted as a volunteer aboard his brother's ship.

=== Action of 27 May 1793 ===
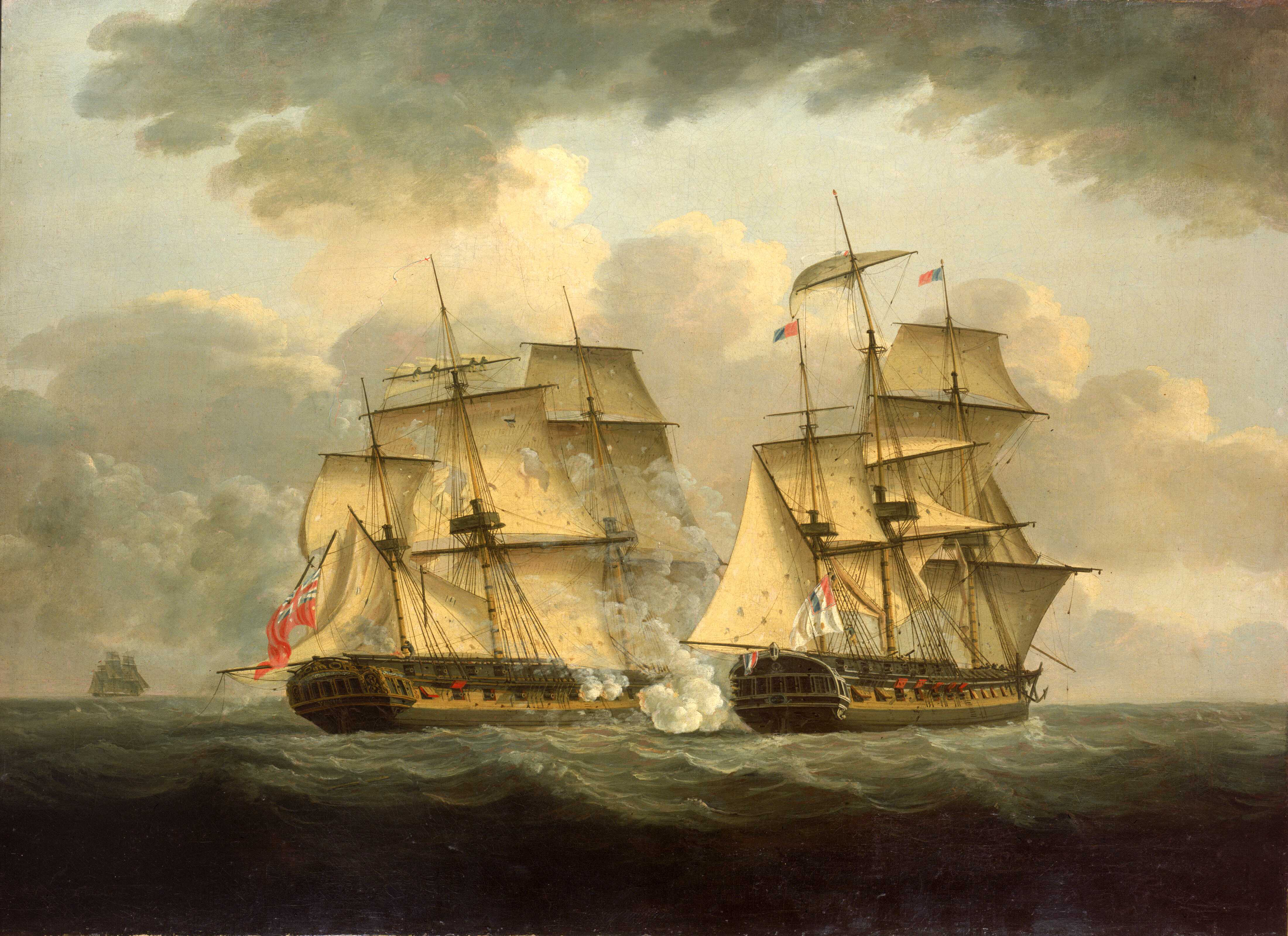
c. 1793–1800 painting of the action

At 01:00 on 27 May, 375 nautical miles (694 km) north west of Cape Finisterre, lookouts on Venus sighted a ship and closed with the strange vessel, which was soon determined to be Sémillante. Gaillard's ship weighed 940 long tons (955 t), more than 200 tons larger than the 722 long tons (734 t) British vessel, and carried 40 guns mounting a 279 lb broadside to the 38-gun, 222 lb broadside of Venus. Despite the disparity, Faulknor determined on combat and at 04:30 the frigates were close enough to exchange long-range shot, the firing becoming more general at 08:00. For two hours the battle continued as the ships drifted closer to one another, until Gaillard attempted to break off the action and escape: his ship was severely damaged and casualties were mounting. Initially it seemed that Faulknor would be able to prevent Gaillard's ship from escaping by keeping pace with the retreating Sémillante, but as he prepared to fire a second broadside into the retreating French ship a new sail appeared, belonging to a large ship flying the French tricolour. With his sails and rigging damaged, Faulknor could not compete against both Sémillante and the newcomer and fell back as the French ships linked up. The new arrival, later identified as the Cléopâtre, chased Venus but Faulknor was able to make use of a strengthening breeze to escape, eventually rejoining Nymphe on 29 May at which point Cléopâtre broke off the chase. The British frigates subsequently shadowed the French vessels northwards, chasing them into Cherbourg in the first week of June.

The engagement cost Faulknor two men killed and 20 wounded, with his ship's rigging and sails badly torn but the hull undamaged. The larger Sémillante was more seriously battered, with twelve killed and 20 wounded, severe damage to the sails and rigging and at least 5 feet (1.5 m) of water in the hold. Faulknor was praised in subsequent histories for causing so much damage despite the disparity in size between his ship and the French frigate, although some contemporary histories misidentified the opponent as either Engageante or Proserpine. The most important outcome of the engagement was that Sémillante was forced to undergo extensive repairs, leaving Cléopâtre to continue to commerce raiding operations alone.

== Battle ==
On 17 June, after escorting the battered Venus back to Falmouth and collecting fresh supplies, Pellew sailed once more in search of Cléopâtre. Passing eastwards along the English coast until he reached Start Point in Devon, Pellew then turned southwards and at 03:30 on 18 June, while approximately 15 nautical miles (28 km) southwest of Start Point, his lookout sighted a sail 20 nautical miles (37 km) to the southeast. At 04:00 Pellew closed to investigate, and the stranger was rapidly identified as Cléopâtre, three days out of Saint-Malo. Captain Mullon initially raising all sail to escape the British frigate. By 05:00 it was obvious that Nymphe was faster than the French ship and Mullon lowered his topsails in anticipation of combat. At 06:00 Nymphe pulled within range and Mullon hailed the British ship, although his words could not be clearly made out. Accounts differ on Pellew's response, which was to elicit a cry of either "Hoa, Hoa" or "Long live King George" from his men, followed by three cheers. Mullon's crew responded with either "Vive la nation" or "Vive la république" and cheering of their own, at which one French sailor attached the captain's cap of liberty to the masthead as a symbol of defiance.

At 06:15, Nymphe was in a position to begin the engagement and opened fire with the port broadside against the starboard quarter of the French ship, to which Cléopâtre responded in kind. The two ships kept up a heavy cannonade for the next fifteen minutes at extreme close range before the French ship suddenly hauled up at 06:30. This gave Pellew the opportunity to engage the enemy even more closely and by 07:00 the French wheel had been destroyed, four successive helmsmen killed and the mizzenmast snapped off 12 feet (3.7 m) above the deck. This damage caused the French ship to swing around wildly, first to port and then suddenly back to starboard into Nymphe, so that the jib boom came to rest between the fore and main masts of the British ship, exerting significant pressure on the mainmast, already weakened by French shot, before the jib boom eventually snapped off. Mullon gave orders for his men to storm Nymphe while the ships were entangled, but his crew refused. As they hesitated, Cléopâtre swung back so that the frigates lay side by side, bow to stern, with Nymphe continuing the heavy cannonade as the British maintopmen worked furiously to disentangle the French rigging from their own ship's damaged mainmast, Pellew encouraging them with a promise of ten guineas to the man who successfully separated the ships. The British captain had initially been concerned that the collision was a deliberate manoeuvre from Mullon and had readied his men in case the French should launch a boarding attack on his frigate. However, as soon as it became clear that the movement was involuntary and that the French were unwilling to press an attack, Pellew reversed his orders and had the men he had assembled to repel boarders climb on board Cléopâtre instead.

At Pellew's orders, British boarders clambered onto the maindeck, through the gunports of the French frigate and even jumped from their own rigging onto the French yards. Although the attackers initially encountered fierce resistance, hand-to-hand combat lasted just ten minutes before the leaderless French sailors broke and ran. Gaining the deck, the British boarding party hauled down the tricolour, signifying the end of the action. Pellew later described the event in a letter to his brother Samuel as "We dished her up in fifty minutes, boarded and took her". On the quarterdeck they found Captain Mullon, who had been struck in the back by a roundshot which had also torn away most of his left hip and was close to death. Seeing that his ship was in the hands of the enemy, Mullon reached into his pocket for a sheet containing the French coastal codes and tore the paper to shreds with his teeth before dying. However, he had inadvertently destroyed his commission as ship's captain instead of the codes, which were later found intact on his body. French casualties in the action totalled 63, including Mullon killed and his three lieutenants wounded. Losses aboard Nymphe was almost as severe, Pellew losing 23 men, including five officers, killed and 27 wounded. More than 100 prisoners were then collected from Cléopâtre and sent aboard Nymphe, leaving 150 remaining on the French ship under the guard of the small prize crew. The ships were then separated and made their way to Portsmouth together, arriving there on 21 June.

== Aftermath ==
The arrival of the captured ship in Britain was greeted with celebration as the first major French warship seized during the conflict. News of the capture reached King George while he was at the opera, and he immediately and spontaneously announced it to the auditorium. Popular prints depicting the action appeared rapidly in large numbers, many of them wildly inaccurate. Shortly after their return to Britain both Pellew brothers were subsequently introduced to King George by Lord Chatham and were rewarded, Edward with a knighthood and Israel with promotion to post captain. First Lieutenant Amherst Morris was promoted to commander, and the ship's other lieutenants were commended for their actions, following Pellew's official dispatch that praised their conduct in the engagement. Cléopâtre was rapidly purchased into the Royal Navy as HMS Oiseau, as the name Cleopatra was already in use. The prize money awarded totalled £7,798 17s and 1d (the equivalent of £977,400 as of 2025), split between Pellew and the crew, and authorised for payment on 14 December 1793. The ship was considered a good command and remained in service throughout the 23 years of warfare which followed, eventually being sold in 1816. During this time at least 220 more French and allied frigates were captured or destroyed by British military action. More than five decades later the battle was among the actions recognised by a clasp attached to the Naval General Service Medal, awarded upon application to all British participants from Nymphe still living in 1847.

Soon after the action, Sir Edward Pellew moved to the large frigate HMS Indefatigable while his brother was given command of the frigate HMS Amphion. Both served with distinction: Sir Edward captured several more frigates and destroyed the French ship of the line Droits de l'Homme at the action of 13 January 1797, ending the war as commander in chief in the Mediterranean. Israel was most noted for capturing the French flagship Bucentaure at the Battle of Trafalgar in 1805 while in command of HMS Conqueror.

Historian William James has noted that while Nymphe was slightly heavier both in tonnage and weight of shot, the French ship carried 80 more personnel who had been serving as a unified crew for significantly longer than those aboard the British frigate; among Pellew's men were 80 Cornish tin miners pressed into service only a few weeks earlier. This should have conferred an advantage on the French during the final boarding action but the loss of the commanding officers and heavy casualties among the French crew enabled the British to capture the ship. Nevertheless, the heavy casualties on both ships demonstrated the fierceness of the action and James notes that "both combatants displayed, throughout the contest, an equal share of bravery and determination". Pellew was so impressed by his opponent that he attended his funeral in Portsmouth on 23 June and later sent a considerable amount of money to Mullon's widow in honour of her husband's bravery.

== Bibliography ==
- Clowes, William Laird (1997) [1900]. The Royal Navy, A History from the Earliest Times to 1900, Volume IV. London: Chatham Publishing. ISBN 1-86176-013-2.
- Gardiner, Robert, ed. (2001) [1996]. Fleet Battle and Blockade. London: Caxton Editions. ISBN 1-84067-363-X.
- Henderson CBE, James (1994) [1970]. The Frigates. London: Leo Cooper. ISBN 0-85052-432-6.
- James, William (2002) [1827]. The Naval History of Great Britain, Volume 1, 1793–1796. London: Conway Maritime Press. ISBN 0-85177-905-0.
- Mostert, Noel (2007). The Line upon a Wind: The Greatest War Fought at Sea Under Sail 1793 – 1815. London: Vintage Books. ISBN 978-0-7126-0927-2.
- Wareham, Tom (2001). The Star Captains, Frigate Command in the Napoleonic Wars. London: Chatham Publishing. ISBN 1-86176-169-4.
- Woodman, Richard (2001). The Sea Warriors. London: Constable Publishers. ISBN 1-84119-183-3.
