= Jean Boniface Textoris =

French military surgeon

Jean Boniface Textoris (24 February 1773 – 3 September 1828) was a French military surgeon, chief medical doctor of the French Navy.

Joining the Navy in 1787, at the age of 14, he rose through the ranks of Navy surgeon, operating during 16 years on most of the major ships of the Ancien Régime and of the French Revolutionary Wars.

Received doctor at the Montpellier Faculty of Medicine in 1803, he was appointed Chief Medical Officer of the squadron shortly after the advent of the First Empire under the command of Admiral de Latouche-Tréville, then on his death, under the command of Admiral de Villeneuve on the Bucentaure. In this capacity, he took part in the battle of Trafalgar (21 October 1805) where he was recognised for his devotion to wounded sailors.

For a few years, he still embarked on hospital ships, but, in 1811, weakened by his health, he applied for a position as an instructor and was appointed to the Army training ship, the Duquesne. As this service was abolished after the fall of Napoleon I, he was appointed to the direction of the Navy's health services in the port of Marseille, where he ended his career. He died in Néoules.

== Biography ==
He was born on 24 February 1773 in Toulon. His father was Boniface Textoris, a Navy surgeon, and his mother, Henriette Brémond. He married Marie Elisabeth Jaume. Their daughter Sophie Héloïse (1805-1836) married Fortuné Joseph César Racord, a surgeon at the French hospital in Smyrna from 1836 to 1849.

=== Old Regime and Revolution ===
As soon as 12 June 1787, Jean Boniface Textoris was employed in the Navy hospitals in Toulon as an auxiliary surgeon. Attached to the health service of the bagne of Toulon, he caught typhus imported by a chaîne (chain) of convicts who arrived at that time.

On September 12, 1790, he became a surgical assistant on the frigate the Minerve which was sent to the Adriatic to observe its coasts and positions. The campaign of this frigate corresponded to the naval stations of the navy to ensure the French presence in the eastern Mediterranean and the security of its trade in the Levant. During this trip, he took notes that would later form the basis of the dissertation he will read on the antiquities of the island of Thasos, at the Academy of Toulon, of which he will be one of the founders and the first secretary.

He was appointed surgeon major on 14 March 1791 on the brig Chasseur until 3 June 1792 and then on the corvette Brune until 17 September 1792, then the frigate Sensible and finally the frigate Iris until 12 March 1793 as second surgeon, then on the Duquesne as surgeon major until 17 May 1794. He then served on the 12 Vestale frigate (18 May to 29 September 1794), the ship Berwick (5 April to 14 May 1795), the Aquilon (15 May to 3 June 1795), the Jemmapes (1796), the Tonnant until 25 April 1798. In this capacity he participated in the fall of the Republic of Venice. On his return to Toulon, he treated the crews of Vice-Admiral François Paul de Brueys d'Aigalliers' squadron at the Toulon lazaret and contracted the "reigning disease" himself.

Promoted to the rank of first class surgeon on 2 July 1801, he was at the same time ordered to go to Cádiz to be attached to the naval division of Rear Admiral Dumanoir le Pelley. On arrival at his destination, he was given the task of running the hospital in Algeciras where the many wounded from the second battle of Algeciras were kept. From 19 July 1801 to 1 January 1802 it was embarked on the Annibal. (Note: The French renamed HMS Hannibal as Annibal.)

On his return from Cádiz, he locked himself up again in the lazaret because he had again contracted the "reigning disease".

He then embarked on the brig the Speedy (1 January 1802), the ship Formidable (6 April 1803), the ship Bucentaure (14 September 1803 to 16 August 1804) under the command of Vice-Admiral Louis-René-Madeleine de Latouche-Tréville.

On 18 May 1803, he was awarded a doctorate in medicine at the Faculty of Medicine in Montpellier, where his inaugural thesis was on scurvy.

=== Empire ===
Textoris re-embarked on the Formidable on 7 August 1804 with the title of chief doctor of the squadron under the orders of Vice-Admiral de Latouche-Tréville (died 19 August 1804) (Note: Hennequin (Biographie maritime, vol.2, p.112) states that "around the last days of July, the symptoms of the disease that had required his return from Saint-Domingue to Europe became very obvious, and soon took an alarming turn." ("Vers les derniers jours du mois de juillet, les symptômes de la maladie qui avait nécessité son retour de Saint-Domingue en Europe se déclarèrent vivement, et bientôt elle prit un caractère alarment."). Levot (Gloires maritimes de la France, p.297) states that Latouche "succumbed on Bucentaure to the consequences of the disease he had contracted at Saint-Domingue" ("Le 19 août 1804, il succombait sur le Bucentaure aux suites de la maladie qu'il avait contractée à Saint-Domingue").), then again on the flagship Bucentaure from 24 October 1804 to 23 October 1805, under the command of Vice-Admiral de Villeneuve, where he became surgeon major on 28 March 1805. In this capacity, he took part in the battle of Trafalgar on 21 October 1805.

The officers of the health service, under the orders of Textoris, were distributed as follows:

- Clément, 1st class health officer on board the Neptune.
- Bodran, health officer 1st class on board the Indomptable.
- Martiny, health officer 1st class aboard the Redoutable.
- Lerebourg, health officer 1st class aboard the Héros.
- Lefort, health officer 1st class on board the Formidable.
- Peyron aboard the Scipion, Truc aboard the Intrépide, Landon aboard the Dugay-Trouin, Barale aboard the Mont Blanc, Laborde aboard the Algésiras, Descarrière aboard the Fougueux, Fournier aboard the Pluton, Fichet aboard the Aigle, Delivet aboard the Argonaute, Lasserre aboard the Berwick, Saint-Hilaire aboard the Achille, Grillon aboard the Cornélie, Dumonteuil aboard the Hermione, Isnard aboard the Hortense, Guigou aboard the Rhin, Pépin aboard the Thémis, Daudi aboard the Furet, Mercey aboard the Observateur.

When the French flagship surrendered to the enemy with Admiral Villeneuve on board, the ship was very heavily damaged, almost dismasted, and covered with corpses and wounded.

Taken in tow by HMS Conqueror, the Bucentaure broke her towing cable. The French officers still on board took the ship from the British and, despite the state of the ship, set course for Cádiz in the middle of a storm. In the early morning, while in sight of the port, she ran aground in the swell, and despite attempts to lighten and free her, the ship began to sink. Some 450 survivors found refuge on the Indomptable which came to the rescue. On board the Indomptable there were more than 1200 men (crew and survivors of the Bucentaure). On the evening of 23 October the storm broke her anchors and drove her back to the coast. Only 150 men were saved.

“Dr. Textoris was to be found wherever there was good to be done and difficulties to be overcome, or to put it in more detail, he devoted all his time to disputing the death of the unfortunate mutilated by carrying out, as soon as possible, the major operations, with the means at hand, and to dispensing, to all the wounded, moral consolation and the most diligent care.” (Note: “Le Dr Textoris se trouvait partout où il y avait du bien à faire et des difficultés à vaincre, ou pour le dire plus en détail, consacrait tous ses instants à disputer à la mort les malheureux mutilés en pratiquant, au plus tôt, les opérations majeures, avec les moyens du bord, et à prodiguer, à tous les blessés, les consolations morales et les soins les plus diligents.”)

On 28 October 1805 Textoris embarked on the ship Héros as chief doctor of the Navy then passed with the same title on the hospital transport Achille (Note: Light parliamentary ship chartered in Cádiz to take the wounded of the Admiral Rosily naval army to Toulon) on 21 April 1806 chartered to Cádiz to take to Toulon the wounded of Admiral François Étienne de Rosily-Mesros' naval army.

On 24 July 1807 he was on the Commerce de Paris until 22 January 1808.

However, his health, weakened by years of a service made him desire a sedentary position; he was requested and obtained an assignment in the maritime hospitals. He re-embarked from 27 September 1811 to 12 August 1815 on the training ship Duquesne anchored in the port of Toulon. He was assigned to the training of officer cadets. Boniface Textoris was to meet his son Marius, a young aspirant freshly graduated from his college in Draguignan.

=== Bourbon Restoration ===
Jean Boniface Textoris passed through the port of Marseille in 1816, where he was in charge of the health service.

In 1821, following the yellow fever epidemic in Catalonia the inhabitants of Marseilles have taken fright. Textoris, wanting to reassure them, read an "Overview on yellow fever" at a meeting of the Royal Medical Society of Marseille on 19 October 1821.

He was appointed vice-president and then president of the same academy on November 8, 1823. Suffering from ophthalmia, followed by supra-orbital neuralgia and rheumatic pain, he was forced to ask for his retirement after thirty years of service.

Jean Boniface Textoris died at Néoules, a small village in Var, on 3 September 1828.

== Distinctions ==
- Knight of the Légion d'honneur (28 avril 1821).

== Works ==
- Étude des eaux (1826)
- Dissertation sur le scorbut (1803)

== Bibliography ==
- Hennequin, Joseph François Gabriel (1835). Biographie maritime ou notices historiques sur la vie et les campagnes des marins célèbres français et étrangers (in French). Vol. 2. Paris: Regnault éditeur.
- Levot, Prosper (1866). Les gloires maritimes de la France: notices biographiques sur les plus célèbres marins (in French). Bertrand.
