= Admiral Pellew =

Admiral Pellew may refer to:

- Edward Pellew, 1st Viscount Exmouth (1757–1833), British Royal Navy admiral
- Fleetwood Pellew (1789–1861), British Royal Navy admiral
- Israel Pellew (1758–1832), British Royal Navy admiral
