= John Clevland =

John Clevland may refer to:

- John Clevland (1706–1763), British politician, Member of Parliament (MP) 1741–1763, Secretary to the Admiralty 1751–1763
- His son John Clevland (1734–1817), British politician, MP for Barnstaple from 1766 to 1802
- His Nephew King John Clevland (1740-?), King of the Banana Islands
