= Charles Penrose (Royal Navy officer) =

Royal Navy officer

Vice-Admiral Sir Charles Penrose GCMG KCB
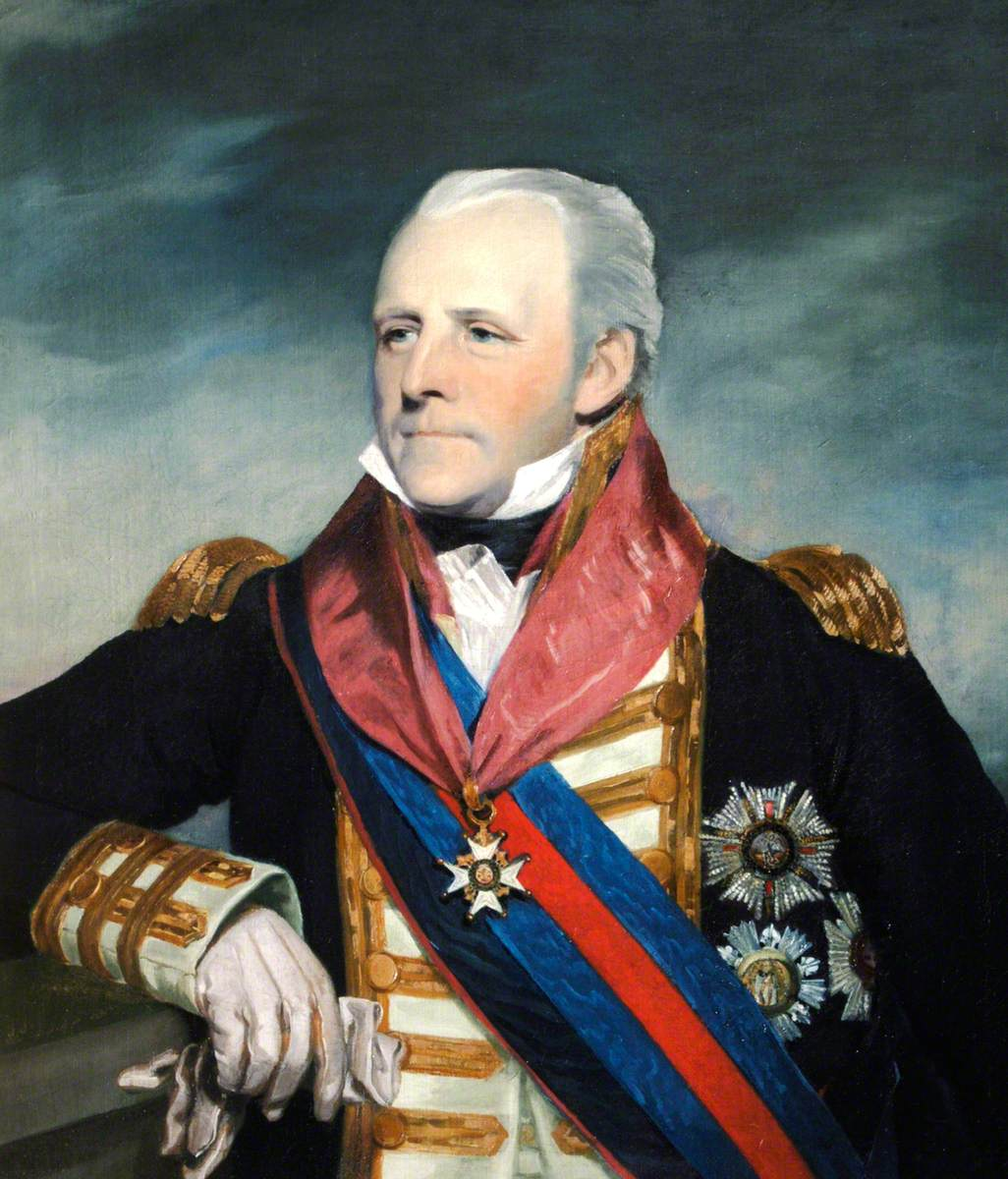
- Born: 20 June 1759; Penryn, Cornwall
- Died: 1 January 1830 (aged 70); Lostwithiel, Cornwall
- Military career
- Allegiance: United Kingdom
- Branch: Royal Navy
- Rank: Vice-Admiral
- Commands: HMS Lynx; HMS Cleopatra; HMS Resolution; HMS Sans Pareil; HMS Carnatic; Mediterranean Fleet
- Conflicts: Fourth Anglo-Dutch War; French Revolutionary Wars; Napoleonic Wars
- Awards: Knight Commander of the Order of the Bath; Knight Commander of the Order of St Michael and St George

Vice-Admiral Sir Charles Vinicombe Penrose GCMG KCB (20 June 1759 – 1 January 1830) was a Royal Navy officer who went on to be Commander-in-Chief, Mediterranean Fleet.

== Naval career ==
Penrose joined the Royal Navy in 1775. He took part in the Battle of Dogger Bank in 1781 and the capture of Martinique in 1793. In 1794 he became Commander in HMS Lynx. He later commanded HMS Cleopatra, HMS Resolution, HMS Sans Pareil and HMS Carnatic.

During 1813 he commanded a small squadron operating off northern Spain and south-western France with his flag in HMS Porcupine. He coordinated naval support for the crossing of the river Adour in early 1814 that allowed the Anglo-Portuguese Army to isolate and invest Bayonne.

A chart of the Mediterranean with the tracks of the different ships bearing the flag of the Rear Admiral, 1814-18

He went on to become Commander-in-Chief, Mediterranean Fleet in Autumn 1814. He remained in this role until May 1815 when Viscount Exmouth reclaimed his former position again. Penrose then accepted the position of Second-in-Command under Exmouth but was appointed overall Commander-in-Chief, Mediterranean Fleet again in May 1816. He retired in 1819.

== Family ==
In 1787 he married Elizabeth Trevenen; they had three daughters.

== Notes ==
Military offices
Preceded by Sir Edward Pellew	Commander-in-Chief, Mediterranean Fleet; 1814–1815	Succeeded by Viscount Exmouth
Preceded by Viscount Exmouth	Commander-in-Chief, Mediterranean Fleet; 1816–1818	Succeeded by Sir Thomas Fremantle
