= William Devaynes =

Banker, Africa trader, India trader, MP

William Devaynes (12 October 1730 – 29 November 1809) was an Africa trader, London banker, Government contractor, director of the East India Company, the Africa Company, the Globe Insurance Company, and the French Hospital and also five times Chairman of the East India Company. He was also for more than 26 years an undistinguished Member of Parliament in turn for Barnstaple and Winchelsea.

== Huguenot origins ==
Devaynes was baptised at St Martin-in-the-Fields Westminster 25 October 1730. He was the fifth of six children baptised there for Huguenot peruke maker John Devaynes and his wife Mary, only surviving child of London's City Remembrancer, William Barker.

An elder brother, John Devaynes (1726-1801), was apothecary to King George III and Queen Charlotte from 1761 to 1795. He appears in Boswell's Life of Johnson as "that ever-cheerful companion Mr Devaynes, apothecary to his Majesty" and was the Devaynes of Messrs Devaynes & Hingeston, court apothecaries, married to Juliana sister of Chambre Hallowes, son-in-law of Edward Lovett Pearce.

Devaynes and his first wife, Jane Wintle, had a daughter (Harriott Augusta born 1773 who married Thomas Monsell). They also had a son William Devaynes, born September 1783, who had children but died just 12 months after his father, 8 December 1810, aged 27. William and Jane married on 15 January 1782.

Mary Wileman, his second wife whom he married 3 February 1806, was said to be 60 years younger than he was. He is reported to have made a settlement on her by which it was in her interest to keep him alive as long as she could and that proved to be almost four years. He died 29 November 1809 aged 79.
Years later on 13 April 1813 at Marylebone Mary married Serjeant Thomas Wilde who late in life was made Lord Chancellor and 1st Lord Truro. She bore Wilde a daughter and two sons.

Devaynes was also survived by an illegitimate daughter and grandson, William Devaynes of Liverpool.

== Africa ==
He was a director of The African Company of Merchants. During Parliament's discussion of the slave trade Devaynes made various statements about West Africa:

that there "sugar grew almost spontaneously";
that he had lately returned from the Gold Coast;
that he had long experience as an agent in Dahomey and the Kingdom of Dahomey he described as the most oppressive tyranny on earth.

It seems he spent his early years in Sierra Leone; in his will he made provision for a mulatto daughter.

== Banker ==
Banking was his core occupation. After he had risen to senior partner his firm, which operated from 39 Pall Mall, London, was known as Devaynes, Dawes and Noble. Devaynes died a rich man. However his estate remained a partner in the bank and a year after his death his banking house was bankrupt. Consequential litigation involving his heirs was to persist for 30 years after his death.

=== Clayton's case ===
Part of the litigation gave rise to the rule in Clayton's case still commonly applied in the 21st century arising from the judgment by Sir William Grant in Devaynes v Noble. Devaynes in this case was the son 1783-1810 and Noble was his father's former partner in the bank. Clayton was a depositor of the failed bank who hoped for funds from the deceased partner's estate.

== India ==
Devaynes was active in the East India Company being chosen by his fellow members of the court of directors to be chairman five separate years. He was a friend of Warren Hastings.

== American wars ==
Between 1776 and 1782 Devaynes and MPs John Henniker (1724-1803) and George Wombwell (1734-1780) together with Edward Wheler (1732-1784) of Wheler Higginson & Co held army victualling contracts for 12,000, sometimes 14,000 men. Like Devaynes, Wombwell and Wheler were directors of the East India Company.

== Parliament ==
In the House he invariably voted with the Government. He spoke very rarely.

Parliament of Great Britain
Preceded by Denys Rolle; John Clevland, junior	Member of Parliament for Barnstaple; 1774–1780; With: John Clevland, junior	Succeeded by John Clevland, junior Francis Basset
Preceded by Francis Basset; John Clevland, junior	Member of Parliament for Barnstaple; 1784–1796; With: John Clevland, junior	Succeeded by John Clevland, junior Richard Wilson
Preceded by Richard Barwell; William Currie	Member of Parliament for Winchelsea; 1796– 1800; With: William Currie	Succeeded by Parliament of the United Kingdom
Parliament of the United Kingdom
Preceded by Parliament of Great Britain	Member of Parliament for Winchelsea; 1801–1802; With: William Currie	Succeeded by Robert Ladbroke; William Moffat
Preceded by Richard Wilson; John Clevland, junior	Member of Parliament for Barnstaple; 1802–1806; With: Sir Edward Pellew 1802–04; Viscount Ebrington from 1804	Succeeded by Viscount Ebrington; William Taylor
