= Russian ship Moskva (1799) =

Russian ship of the line (launched in 1799)

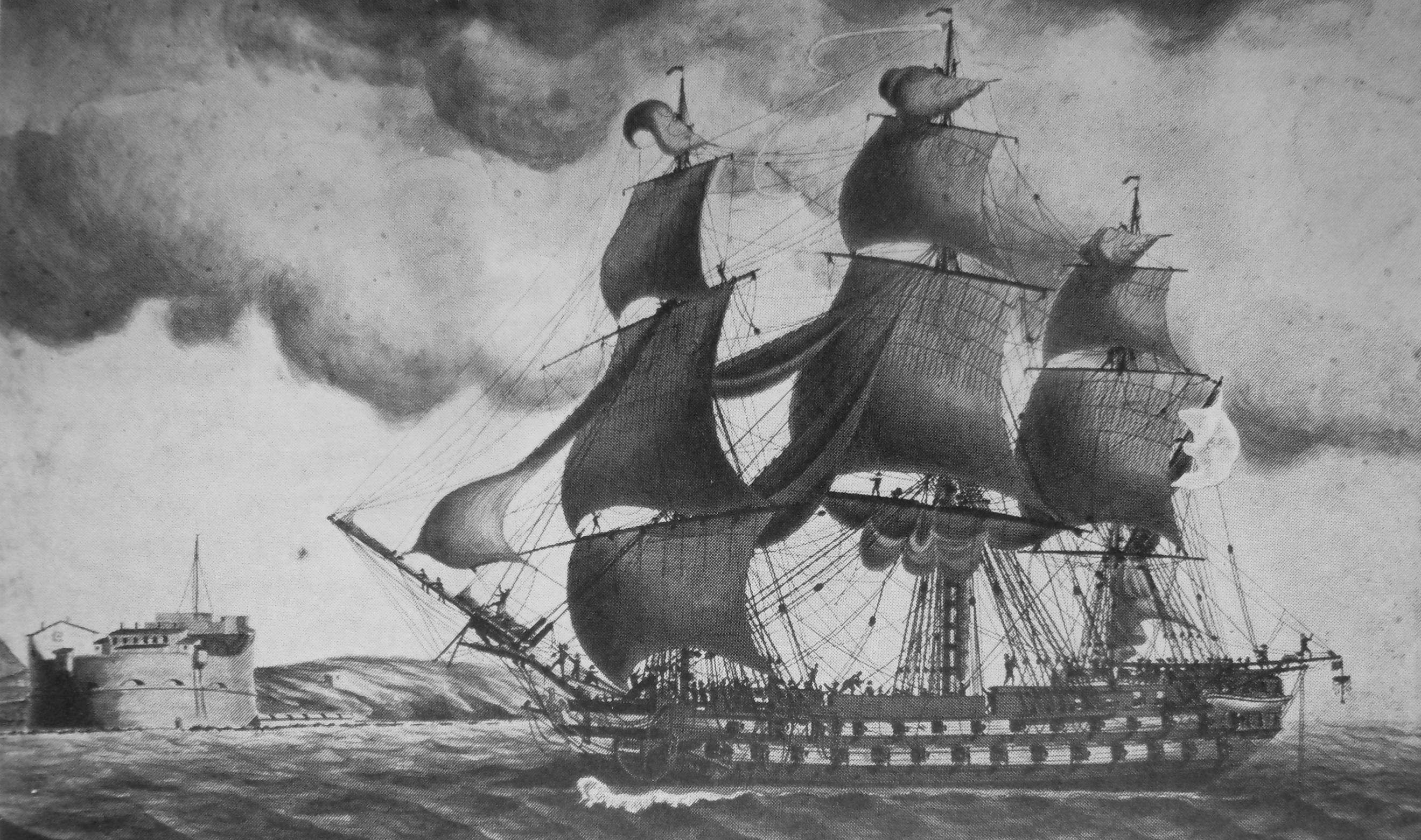
- The ex-russian ship-of-the-line Moskva in French service as Duquesne, sailing in front of the Tour Royale, Toulon. Painting by André Moretti, 1812.

History

Russian Empire
- Name: Moskva
- Builder: G. Ignatyev
- Laid down: 10 August [O.S. 21 August] 1798
- Launched: 11 May [O.S. 22 May] 1799
- Commissioned: 29 August [O.S. 8 September] 1799

France
- Name: Duquesne
- Acquired: 27 September 1809
- Commissioned: 31 July 1811
- Renamed: 5 February 1811
- Reclassified: Training ship
- Homeport: Toulon
- Fate: Dismantled in 1833

General characteristics
- Class & type: Yaroslav-class 74-gun ship of the line
- Length: 170 ft 0 in (51.8 m) (upper deck)
- Beam: 46 ft 8 in (14.2 m)
- Depth of hold: 20 ft 8 in (6.3 m)
- Propulsion: Sail (three masts, ship rig)
- Armament: Lower deck: 26 × 30-pounder guns + 2 × 60-pounder (1 pood) edinorogs; Upper deck: 26 × 18-pounder guns + 2 × 24-pounder (1/2 pood) edinorogs; Fc & QD: 18 × 8-pounder guns

The Russian ship Moskva (also Moscou; Russian: Москва) was a 74-gun ship of the line of the Yaroslav class launched in 1799. She served in the North Sea and the Mediterranean until 1808, was sold to France in 1809 and was renamed Duquesne in 1811.

== Service ==
The Moskva was launched on 22 May 1799 at Arkhangelsk. Together with its sister-ship Saint-Peter (Sviatoi Piotr, Russian: Святой Пётр, launched on 22 July 1799), the Moskva became part of the Baltic Fleet. Both of these ships were nearly identical and shared the same career during service.

=== Operations in the North Sea and Baltic Sea ===
Under the command of Gavril Sarychev, the Moskva took part in the war with France between 1798 and 1800. On 8 September 1799 in the squadron of Vice-Admiral B.A. Baratynsky (Russian: Баратынский, Богдан Андреевич), she sailed from Arkhangelsk for the English coast to take action against France and Holland in cooperation with the British fleet. On 2 October, she survived a storm, was separated from the squadron and then went on her own (while Sviatoi Piotr had to spend two winters in Bergen for repairs). Late October 1799 she was active in the Lithuanian seas, and then returned to England. On 20 July 1800, the Moskva left Portsmouth within a squadron for Russia, arriving in Kronstadt on 26 September.

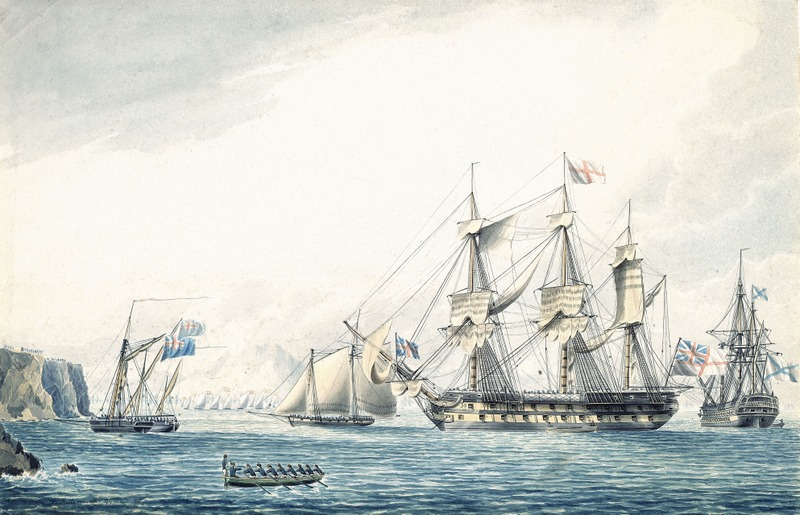
Anglo-Russian navy cooperating 1799–1807. Collection of the National Maritime Museum; by Thomas Buttersworth; 19th century.

In 1801 and 1803, while being commanded by A.S. Babaev in 1801–1802, the ship was part of squadrons in the Gulf of Finland. From 1803 on, the Moskva was under the command of Yegor Pavlovich de Goetzen (or Getzen, Hetzen or Jeitzen, Russian: Гетцен, Егор Павлович). Upgraded in 1804 in Kronstadt and covered with copper sheets, she was sent to participate in the war against Turkey and France.

=== Operations in the Mediterranean ===
On 5 July 1805 a decree of Alexander I. was issued to prepare a squadron commanded by Vice Admiral D. Senyavin (including the Moskva under Captain E.P. Goetzen and Sviatoi Piotr under Captain I.A. Baratynsky) for expeditions to the Mediterranean. On 10 September [O.S. 22 September] 1805 the squadron left Kronstadt, passed Reval – Helsingør (3 October [O.S. 15 October]) – Portsmouth (9 October [O.S. 21 October]) – Gibraltar – Cagliari – Messina (11 January [O.S. 23 January] 1806 (where they united with the squadrons of rear-admirals Greig and Aleksandr Andreyevich Sorokin), and reached Corfu on 18 January [O.S. 30 January] 1806. Then Moskva escorted troop transports to the Dardanelles and returned to Corfu. In April 1806, she brought troops from Corfu to the ex-Austrian fortress Cattaro.

On 20 May [O.S. 2 June] 1806, still as part of Senyavin's squadron, together with the ships of the line Selafail, Sviatoi Piotr and the frigate Venus, she came to Trieste to liberate Russian merchant ships detained by Austria. After withdrawal of these ships, the Moskva was left there with some smaller vessels for the blockade of Venice. On 30 May [O.S. 12 June], she fired on a large caravan of merchant ships leaving Venice for Istria with French gunboats, forcing them back in the port. From June to September 1806 she participated in actions against the French in Ragusa and Castelnuovo (in Russian hands 28 February 1806 to 12 August 1807). In December 1806 the Moskva came to the squadron of Senyavin, who besieged the fortress of Curzola, and was involved in the bombardment and capitulation of the French in the Fortress Brazza.

After the departure of Senyavin's squadron from Corfu to the Dardanelles on 10 February 1807, the Moskva remained in the Adriatic squadron of Captain-Commodore Ilya Andreevich Baratynsky (Russian: Баратынский, Илья Андреевич), who also directly commanded the ship Sviatoi Piotr. This squadron essentially comprised 3 ships of the line, 3 frigates, 3 brigs and 1 corvette. On 12 May [O.S. 24 May] 1807 Baratynsky landed troops at Curzola. Late May 1807 the ships fired on French troops moving southwards along the coast and landed Russian troops near the Almissa fortress. Baratynsky returned to Castelnuovo about 6 June.

=== Attempted escape in the Anglo-Russian War ===
After the Treaty of Tilsit in July 1807, Baratynsky handed over the fortresses of Budua, Castelnuovo (12 August), Cattaro, Corfu (20 August) to the French. His ships left Castelnuovo for Venice. Although Venice was blocked by the now hostile British, the Moskva was allowed to disembark troops in Pirano thanks to rear-admiral Greig's negotiations with the British captain Campbell.

After armistice with Turkey, on 22 August 1807 a large part of the Russian fleet (5 battleships, 4 frigates, 4 corvettes, 4 brigs and many captured Turkish ships, under Captain-Commodore Saltanov) was ordered for return to Sevastopol.

On 24 August 1807, Senyavin detached Greig with the Moskva, Sviatoi Piotr and some smaller vessels to re-occupy Corfu, ceded to Russia by France according to the Treaty of Tilist. The remaining part of the fleet (about 10 ships of line, three frigates) under Senyavin's command reached Corfu on 4 September [O.S. 16 September] 1807 and was ordered to go westwards. On 19 September [O.S. 1 October] 1807, Senyavin's fleet set sail towards Gibraltar, to reach the Baltic. This fleet however later got interned by the British near Lisbon on 30 October [O.S. 11 November] 1807.

Due to their used condition, the ships Moskva and Sviatoi Piotr at first were left behind at the bay of Cattaro. However, both of the ships started from Corfu on 2 October [O.S. 14 October] 1807 also to make it into the Baltic. They were damaged in a storm between Sicily and Sardinia and entered the port of Portoferraio for repairs on 17 October [O.S. 29 October]. Baratynsky headed back to Russia on land in December 1807, and the two ships were both under command of the captain of the Moskva, de Goetzen, now.

On 24 April 1808 the French brig le Requin ordered the two ships to Toulon to join the squadron commanded by Admiral Ganteaume. On 3 May, Moskva and Sviatoi Piotr anchored in Toulon, and having stayed there for 22 months, still under Russian flag, the ships' commander de Goetzen on 27 September 1809 had to cede them to France in compensation for repair and supplies to the crews. (The damaged ships said to be worth some 794,300 francs were to settle French costs estimated 1,063,333 francs. The rest of the debt was probably not paid any more after outbreak of war between Russia and France). Early 1810, the ships' crews left Toulon on land and returned to Russia on 17 May [O.S. 29 May] 1810.

=== Reused as French ship Duquesne in Toulon in 1811 ===
Of the both damaged ships, alone the Moskva seemed still of some use for service in Ganteaume's defence fleet against the British blockade. By decree of 27 September 1810, ordering the foundation of two new naval schools in Brest and Toulon, the Moskva was converted to a training ship and renamed Duquesne on 5 February 1811. From January 1811, Captain Baron Motard commanded the École spéciale de Marine (special school of the navy) in Toulon on this ship, assisted by Capitaine de frégate Fourré, provisionally appointed on 31 July 1811. Shortly afterwards, the mutilated Capitaine de vaisseau Jean Alexandre Péridier was appointed commander of the school, from 24 December 1811 to 11 December 1812. The names of the Lieutenants de vaisseau were Vuisson, Venel, Albert and Pellé Bridoire. Names of ensigns were Fréminville, Battendier, Montfort, Maud'huy.

From 27 September 1811 to 12 August 1815, the professor of military medicine and surgery was Jean Boniface Textoris, Chief Medical Officer of the French squadron at the Battle of Trafalgar.

In 1816 the Duquesne was transformed into a hulk which stayed in harbour, acting as a floating school. Class rooms were installed in the upper deck, while students rooms with hammocks were located in the lower deck. Skills in navigating were trained on several corvettes, cooperating with the main school-ship.

=== Later fate ===
The Duquesne kept being a school-ship until 1822, then a floating prison, until finally dismantled in the years 1830 to 1833. The Sviatoi Piotr in 1810 became a depot ship, a station ship from January 1812 until end of 1813. It was used as prison hulk from October 1813 until 1819.
