= Richard Wilson (Barnstaple MP) =

English politician

Richard Wilson (c. 1755 – 1815) was an Irish-born politician whose origins are obscure.

Wilson was Member of Parliament (MP) in the Parliament of Great Britain for Barnstaple from 1796 to 1802.

Wilson married Anne, daughter of Charles Townshend. They were divorced in 1798. Lady Louisa Stuart wrote of his elopement with Anne Townshend that:

...this Mr Wilson - whose name, when known, made nobody the wiser - was an Irishman, born to an inheritance of three hundred a year, but greatly in debt, of no profession, accounted a black-leg, and chiefly remarkable for having fought two or three duels... His conversation was bragging and his manner familiar and aisy like those of the Paddy in a farce. All his friends had ten thousand a year; he talked of his horses and carriages, his estate and his interest; and when he addressed you as a lady, you could not help drawing back for fear he should give you a kiss.

Wilson died, laden with debts, sometime in 1815. He had 3 sons, one of whom died in the West Indies, and 2 daughters.

Parliament of Great Britain
Preceded by William Devaynes and John Clevland	Member of Parliament for Barnstaple; 1796–1800; With: John Clevland	Succeeded by (Parliament of Great Britain abolished)
Parliament of the United Kingdom
Preceded by (self, in Parliament of Great Britain)	Member of Parliament for Barnstaple; 1801–1802; With: John Clevland	Succeeded by William Devaynes and Sir Edward Pellew
