= John Clevland (1734–1817) =

British politician

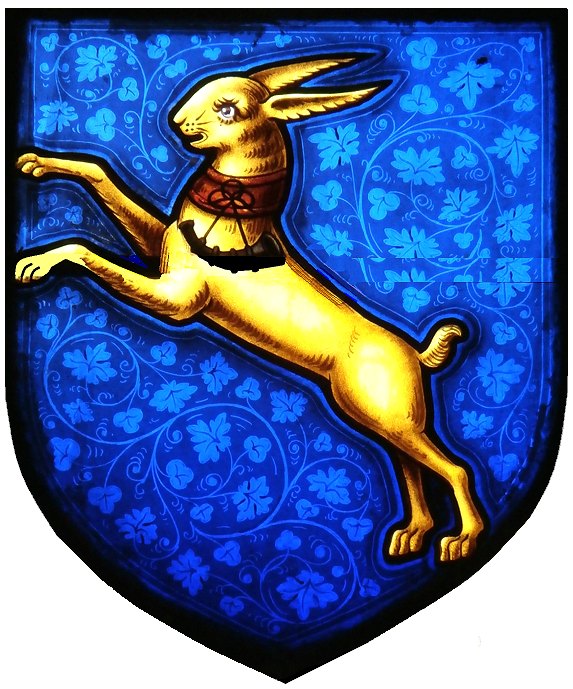
Arms of Clevland of Tapeley: Azure, a hare salient or collared gules pendent therefrom a bugle horn stringed sable. Detail from memorial stained glass window to Archibald Clevland (1833-1854), Westleigh Church

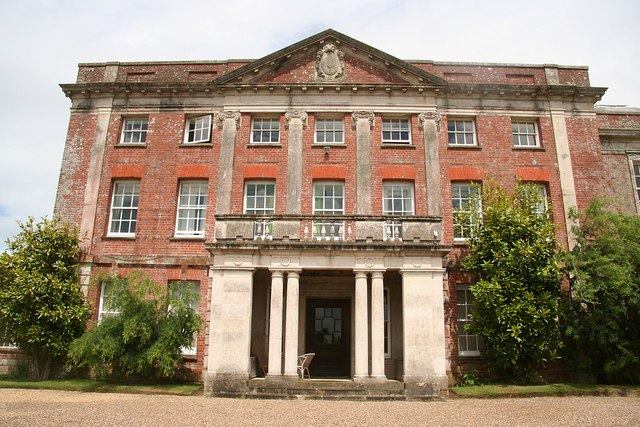
Tapeley Park - Clevland family seat

John II Clevland (1734 – June 1817) of Tapeley in the parish of Westleigh, Devon, was seven times Member of Parliament for Barnstaple from 1766 to 1802.

== Origins ==
He was the eldest son of John I Clevland (1706–1763), Secretary to the Admiralty from 1751 to 1763, and a Member of Parliament from 1741 to 1761. His mother was Elizabeth Child, daughter of Sir Caesar Child, 2nd Baronet (c. 1678–1725).

== Career ==
For most of his career, Clevland worked in the Admiralty. He was seven times elected a Member of Parliament for Barnstaple from 1766 to 1802.

== Marriage ==
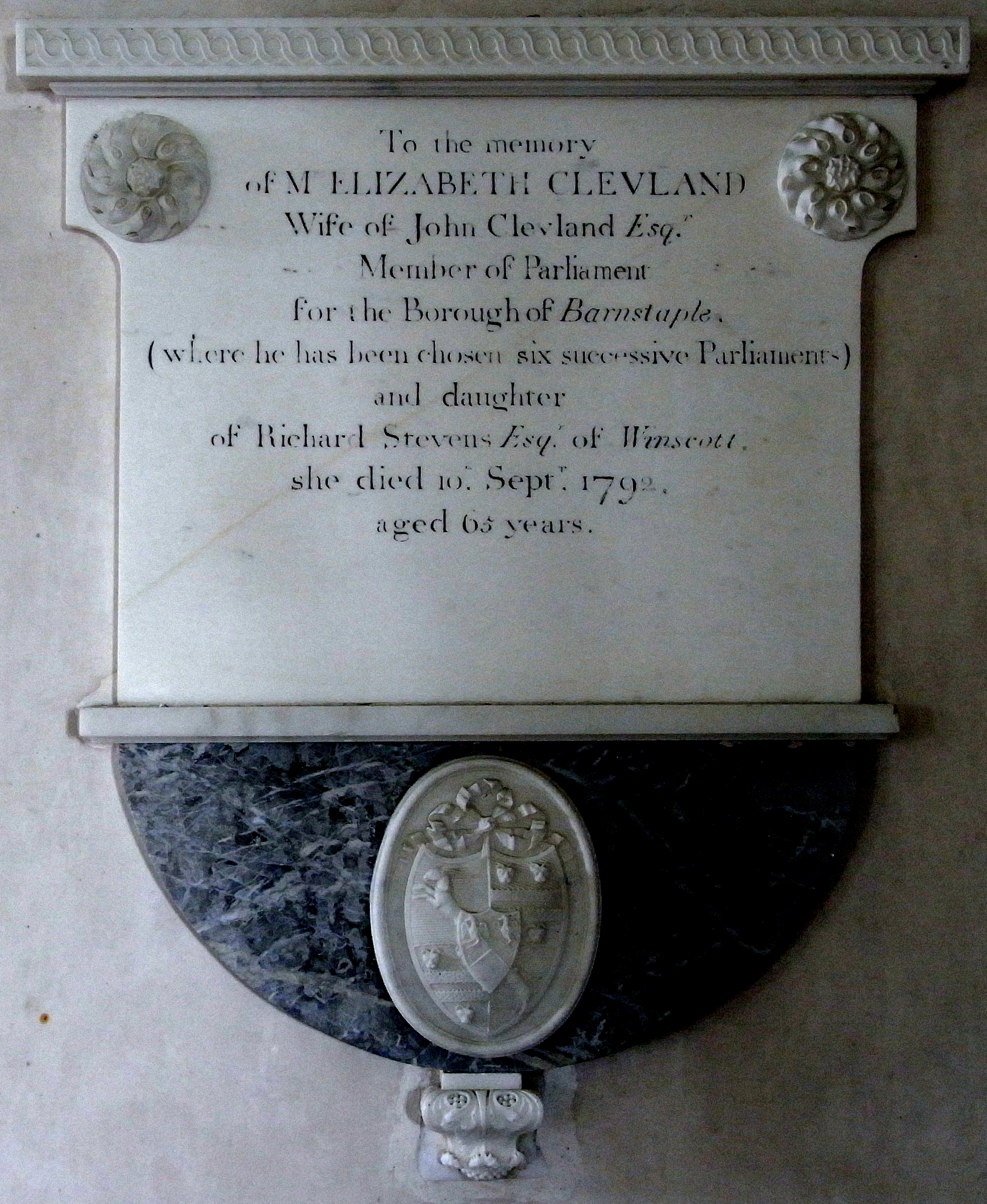
Mural monument to Elizabeth Stevens (1727-1792), wife of John II Clevland (1734–1817), Peters Marland Church

In 1782 he married Elizabeth Stevens (1727–1792), widow of Robert Awse of Horwood House, Frithelstock, and only surviving child of Richard Stevens (1702–1776) of Winscott in the parish of Peters Marland, Devon, Member of Parliament for Callington in Cornwall (1761–1768). The marriage was without progeny.

== Succession ==
His heir to Tapeley and his other estates was his great nephew Col. Augustus II Saltren-Willett (1781–1849), JP and DL for Devon, who following his inheritance assumed in 1847 by royal licence the surname and arms of Clevland in lieu of Willett. He was the son of Augustus I Saltren-Willett (1760–1813) (who died at Tapeley in 1813 as his mural monument in Westleigh Church attests), builder of Port Hill House in Northam (visible across the River Torridge from Tapeley) the son of William Saltren (the second son of Thomas Saltren of Stone in the parish of Parkham) by his wife Hester Clevland, the eldest full-blood sister of John II Clevland (1734–1817).

== Monument ==
A mural monument to his wife survives in Peters Marland Church inscribed as follows:

To the memory of Mrs Elizabeth Clevland wife of John Clevland Esq., Member of Parliament for the Borough of Barnstaple (where he has been chosen six successive parliaments) and daughter of Richard Stevens of Winscott. She died 16 September 1792 aged 65 years

Below is a white marble relief sculpted escutcheon showing the following arms: Quarterly 1st & 4th: Clevland; 2nd & 3rd: Vert, two bars engrailed between three leopard's faces or (Child baronets, of the City of London (1685) (Child of Surat, East Indies and Dervill, Essex, Baronet, created 1684, extinct 1753), the arms of William Clevland's mother Elizabeth Child). Overall is an inescutcheon of pretence of Stevens: Per chevron azure and gules, in chief two falcons rising belled or.

== Sources ==
- Lauder, Rosemary, Devon Families, Tiverton, 2002, pp. 41–5, Christie of Tapeley Park
- Burke's Genealogical and Heraldic History of the Landed Gentry, 15th Edition, ed. Pirie-Gordon, H., London, 1937, p. 408, pedigree of Clevland, appended to pedigree of Christie of Tapeley Park and Glyndebourne, pp. 407–8
- Burke's Genealogical and Heraldic Dictionary of the Landed Gentry, 1858, Volume 3, pedigree of Clevland of Tapeley
- Vivian, Lt.Col. J.L., (Ed.) The Visitations of the County of Devon: Comprising the Heralds' Visitations of 1531, 1564 & 1620, Exeter, 1895

Parliament of Great Britain
Preceded by Denys Rolle; George Amyand	Member of Parliament for Barnstaple; 1766–1800; With: Denys Rolle to 1774; William Devaynes 1774–1780; Francis Basset 1780–1784; William Devaynes 1784–1796; Richard Wilson from 1796	Succeeded by Parliament of the United Kingdom
Parliament of the United Kingdom
Preceded by Parliament of Great Britain	Member of Parliament for Barnstaple; 1801–1802; With: Richard Wilson	Succeeded by William Devaynes; Sir Edward Pellew
