= Israel Pellew =

Royal Navy officer (1758–1832)

Admiral Sir Israel Pellew KCB
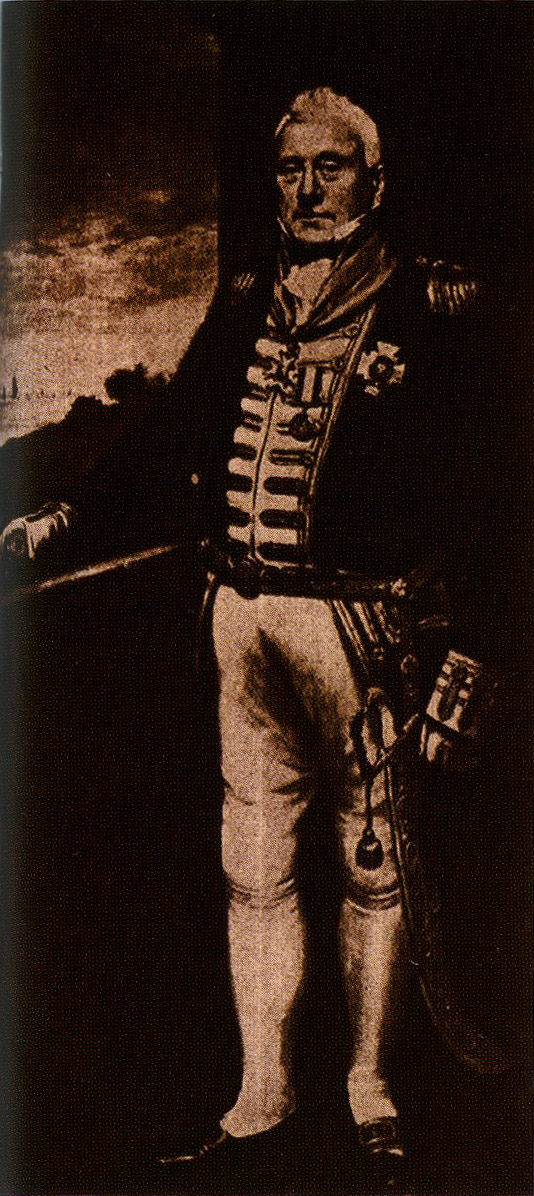
- Portrait of Pellew
- Born: 25 August 1758; Dover, Kent
- Died: 19 July 1832 (aged 73); Plymouth, Devon
- Spouse: Mary Helen Gilmore
- Relatives: Edward Pellew, 1st Viscount Exmouth (brother)
- Military career
- Allegiance: Great Britain; United Kingdom
- Branch: Royal Navy
- Service years: 1771–1830
- Rank: Admiral
- Commands: HMS Resolution; HMS Squirrel; HMS Amphion; HMS Greyhound; HMS Cleopatra; HMS Conqueror
- Conflicts: American War of Independence; Battle of Rhode Island; French Revolutionary Wars; Action of 18 June 1793; Napoleonic Wars; Battle of Trafalgar; Bombardment of Algiers (1816)

Admiral Sir Israel Pellew, KCB (25 August 1758 – 19 July 1832) was a Royal Navy officer who served in the American War of Independence and French Revolutionary and Napoleonic Wars.

== Early naval service ==
Pellew first went to sea aboard the sloop Falcon in 1771, serving in the West Indies. He went to the North American station on the frigate HMS Flora in 1776. Pellew was promoted to lieutenant in the Royal George in April 1779 and then served on the frigates Danae and Apollo. He was placed in command of the cutter Resolution in the North Sea in 1782. In 1783 he captured the Dutch privateer Flushinger in a single-ship action. Resolution transferred to the Irish station, with Pellew remaining in command until 1787. In March 1789 he joined Salisbury, and was promoted to commander in 1790, but was not employed again during the peace.

On the outbreak of war in 1793 Pellew was temporarily without a ship, and served as a volunteer aboard his brother's command Nymphe, being in charge of her aft guns when she captured the French frigate Cléopâtre on 18 June, the first British naval victory of the French Revolutionary Wars. For this action, his brother was knighted and Israel Pellew was presented to King George III and made post captain of Squirrel.

In April 1795, he was made captain of a larger frigate, Amphion, commanding her off Newfoundland and in the North Sea. In September 1796, sailing to join his brother's squadron in the Channel, Pellew took Amphion into Plymouth for repairs. On 22 September she suddenly exploded alongside the dock. About 300 of her crew and visitors were killed. Pellew survived, being blown through an open stern gallery window on to the deck of a sheer hulk. An inquiry blamed the explosion on the Amphion's gunner, who was suspected of stealing gunpowder which caught fire and blew up the fore magazine. However, Pellew had already complained that the magazine was poorly constructed and unsafe, and questioned the judgement on the deceased gunner.

In February 1797, Pellew was appointed to Greyhound but, having been put ashore when her crew mutinied at the Nore, and under pressure from his commander-in-chief, he resigned the command, being moved in July to Cleopatra. He commanded her first in the Channel, until November 1798, and then on the Halifax and Jamaica stations.

In 1800, Pellew suffered a setback when a boat attack to seize some Spanish vessels from an anchorage off Cuba was driven off with significant casualties and only the capture of a small galley. Later Cleopatra ran aground off Abaco, one of the Bahamas. She was aground for three days and only floated off after her guns and some ballast had been thrown overboard.

== Trafalgar campaign ==
Pellew next went to sea in April 1804 following the outbreak of the Napoleonic Wars, commanding the ship of the line Conqueror in the Channel before going to the Mediterranean in September and participating in the full chase across the Atlantic after the French fleet and the return leg to Cádiz. During this time, Pellew became good friends with his superior, Horatio Nelson, and joined the famous "band of brothers" with which Nelson surrounded himself. Conqueror fought well at the Battle of Trafalgar, being the fourth ship in the van or weather column under Nelson's command. Bucentaure, French Vice-admiral Pierre-Charles Villeneuve's flagship, surrendered to a British boarding party from Conqueror who had been sent aboard by Pellew to receive Villeneuve's sword. However, as the Conqueror had sailed on to engage Santísima Trinidad and to attempt to block the escape of Pierre Dumanoir le Pelley's squadron, the boarding party could not return the sword to Pellew. During the course of these later actions, Pellew was wounded by a close miss from a cannonball, but refused to report it or have it treated until well after the battle.

Villenueve's sword was eventually given to Admiral Collingwood after the battle and he retained it much to Pellew's disgust. Pellew was also greatly irked following the battle by the shadow of his brother, which appeared when the boarding party arrived on the deck of the Bucentaure. Its leader, Marine Captain James Atcherly, boarded the ship and encountered Villeneuve, who asked for the identity of his captor. Atcherly replied that it was Pellew, whereupon Villeneuve pronounced "It is a satisfaction to me that it is to so fortunate an officer as Sir Edward Pellew that I have surrendered". The greatly embarrassed Atcherly corrected his mistake, to which Villeneuve shouted "His brother? What are there two of them? Helas!"

Although Conqueror's sails and rigging suffered considerable damage, she suffered only three killed and nine wounded despite being in the thick of battle, and returned to Gibraltar largely unharmed by the large storm which followed the action, and was even able to help some more crippled ships back to port. After Trafalgar, Conqueror helped continue to blockade Cádiz and then, in 1807, was in the squadron sent to assist the transfer of the Portuguese court to Brazil. She remained off the Portuguese coast during much of 1808, eventually returning home after a Russian squadron under Dmitry Senyavin based in the Tagus agreed to be escorted to England. Pellew then left her and was appointed to superintend the payment of ships in the Medway.

== Admiral Pellew and retirement ==
In 1810, Pellew was promoted to rear-admiral and, in 1816, his brother, on receiving the command of the Mediterranean fleet, made him captain of the fleet, effectively his chief of staff. In 1815, Pellew was knighted. He retained the position of captain of the fleet until 1816, taking a prominent part in the negotiations with the Barbary powers that year and the ensuing bombardment of Algiers. This marked the end of his active service, but Pellew advanced automatically to the rank of vice-admiral in 1819.

In the same year his only son, Edward, an officer in the Life Guards, was killed in a duel with a brother officer in Paris. Pellew was appointed a full admiral in 1830. He had moved to Plymouth in retirement and died there in 1832, after a long and painful illness.

Pellew was buried near his home in Plymouth at Charles the Martyr Church, but on 21 March 1941 a massive German air raid in the Blitz demolished the church and its attendant graveyard. The ruins of the church remain standing as a memorial to that night, but there is no surviving indication of the whereabouts of Pellew's body or tomb, which is believed to have been lost.
