= French ship Bucentaure (1803) =

19th century ship of the line

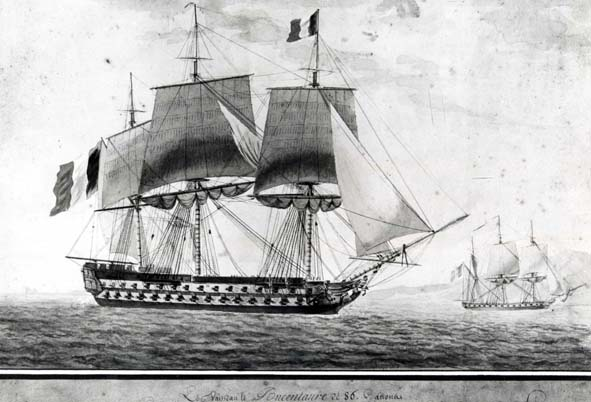
- Bucentaure

History

France
- Namesake: Bucentaur
- Builder: Arsenal de Toulon
- Laid down: 1802
- Launched: 14 July 1803
- Commissioned: 1804
- Stricken: 23 October 1805
- Captured: 21 October 1805 (Battle of Trafalgar) – later recaptured from prize crew
- Fate: Wrecked on 23 October 1805

General characteristics
- Class & type: Bucentaure-class ship of the line
- Displacement: 3,868 tonneaux
- Tons burthen: 2,034 port tonneaux
- Length: 51 m (167 ft 4 in) (keel); 59.26 m (194 ft 5 in) (gundeck)
- Beam: 14 m (45 ft 11 in)
- Draught: 6 m (19 ft 8 in)
- Complement: 840
- Armament: 86 guns; 30 × 36-pounders; 32 × 24-pounders; 18 × 12-pounders; 6 × 36-pounder howitzers

Bucentaure was an 86-gun ship of the line of the French Navy, and the lead ship of her class. She was the flagship of Vice-Admiral Latouche Tréville, who died on board on 18 August 1804, and later of Vice-Admiral Pierre-Charles Villeneuve as the flagship of the Franco-Spanish fleet at the Battle of Trafalgar.

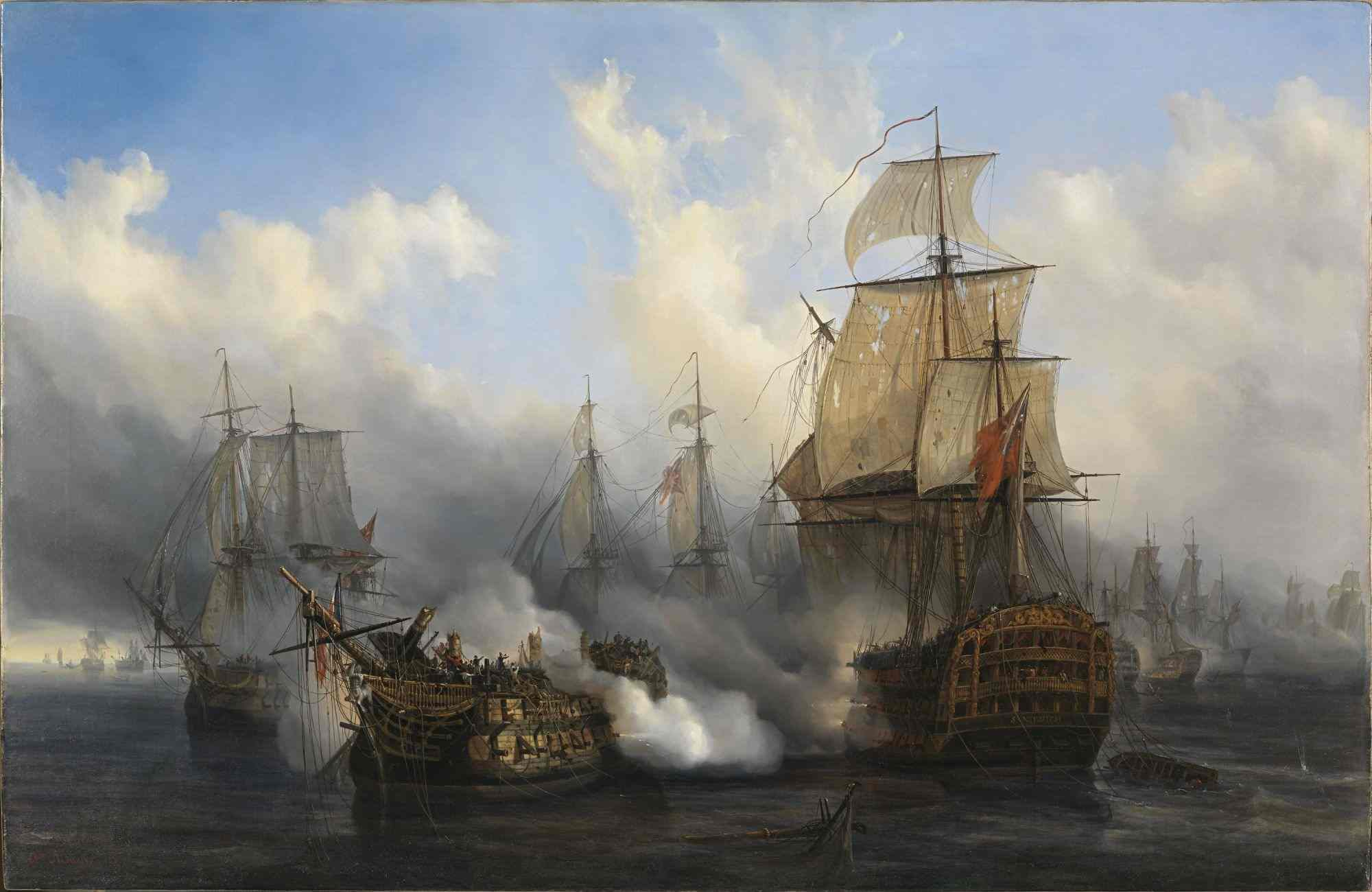
Bucentaure at Trafalgar

The French Bucentaure's figurehead depicted a bucentaur: a mythical, centaur-like creature with the body of a bull and the head of a man.

Vice-Admiral Villeneuve hoisted his flag on 6 November 1804. Bucentaure hosted the Franco-Spanish war council while sheltered from the British fleet at Cádiz. The vote was to remain in safe waters (a decision later overruled by Admiral Villeneuve). During the council, Spanish general Antonio de Escaño complained that the atmospheric pressure was descending (a sign of approaching storms). French vice-admiral Charles René Magon de Médine famously retorted "the thing descending here is braveness". This offended Admiral Federico Gravina and other Spanish officers, who did not later oppose the imprudent order of taking to sea.

At the Battle of Trafalgar, on 21 October 1805, she was commanded by Captain Jean-Jacques Magendie. Admiral Nelson's HMS Victory, leading the weather column of the British fleet, broke the French line just astern of Bucentaure and just ahead of Redoutable. Victory raked her less-protected stern and the vessel lost 197 men, with 85 wounded (including Captain Magendie); the surgeon on board was Dr. Textoris, the squadron's Chief Medical Officer. Admiral Villeneuve was lucky to survive, but this effectively put Bucentaure out of most of the fight. After three hours of fighting, she surrendered to Captain James Atcherly of the Marines from HMS Conqueror.

Villeneuve is supposed to have asked to whom he was surrendering. On being told it was Captain Pellew, he replied, "There is no shame in surrendering to the gallant Sir Edward Pellew." When he was informed that the Conqueror's captain (Israel Pellew) was Sir Edward's brother, he said, "England is fortunate to have two such brothers." A prize crew of 71 was sent aboard and a tow line passed but this parted as soon as sail was set and both vessels drifted towards the shore during the night.

On the morning of 22 October, the Conqueror re-established the tow but, close by a lee shore with the weather deteriorating, she soon decided to leave her prize. That evening, the captured French officers were able to persuade the heavily outnumbered prize crew to surrender and the combined crews managed to set sail for nearby Cádiz. The Spanish pilot aboard missed the harbour entrance in the stormy dark and, at 8:15 p.m., the Bucentaure hit rocks near the Santa Catalina fort. Efforts during the night to save the ship failed and the crew were evacuated by boat before the hull of the Bucentaure submerged on the afternoon of the 23rd. Her French crew mostly went aboard the Indomptable and drowned when she too sank on the night of 25/26 October.

== Bibliography ==
- Adkin, Mark (2005). The Trafalgar Companion: A Guide to History's Most Famous Sea Battle and the Life of Admiral Lord Nelson. Aurum. ISBN 1-84513-018-9.
- Adkins, Roy (2004). Trafalgar: The Biography of a Battle. Little, Brown. ISBN 0-316-72511-0.
- Clayton, Tim & Craig, Phil (2004). Trafalgar: The Men, the Battle, the Storm. Hodder & Stoughton. ISBN 0-340-83026-3.
- Colomb, Philip Howard (1905). The battle of Trafalgar. W. Clowes & sons, limited, 1905. p. 18.
- Corbett, Sir Julian Stafford (1919). The campaign of Trafalgar, Volume 2. Longmans, Green, and co., 1919. p. 538.
- Fremont-Barnes, Gregory (2005). Trafalgar 1805: Nelson's Crowning Victory. Campaign. Vol. 157. Osprey Publishing. ISBN 1-84176-892-8.
- Goodwin, Peter (2005). The Ships of Trafalgar: The British, French and Spanish Fleets October 1805. Naval Institute Press. ISBN 1-59114-824-3.
- Roche, Jean-Michel (2005). Dictionnaire des bâtiments de la flotte de guerre française de Colbert à nos jours [Dictionary of French Warships from Colbert to Today]. Vol. 1: 1671-1870. Roche. ISBN 978-2-9525917-0-6. OCLC 165892922.
- Winfield, Rif & Roberts, Stephen S. (2015) French Warships in the Age of Sail 1786-1861: Design, Construction, Careers and Fates. Seaforth Publishing. ISBN 978-1-84832-204-2
