= HMS Amphion (1780) =

Frigate of the Royal Navy

- Amphion

History

Great Britain
- Name: HMS Amphion
- Ordered: 11 June 1778
- Builder: Royal Dockyard, Chatham
- Laid down: 1 October 1778
- Launched: 27 December 1780
- Commissioned: December 1780
- Honours and awards: Participated in:
- Fate: Blew up, 22 September 1796

General characteristics
- Class & type: Fifth-rate frigate
- Tons burthen: 679.3 (bm)
- Length: 126 ft 1 in (38.43 m) (gundeck); 104 ft 3 in (31.78 m) (keel)
- Beam: 35 ft (11 m)
- Depth of hold: 12 ft 2 in (3.71 m)
- Propulsion: Sails
- Sail plan: Full-rigged ship
- Complement: 220
- Armament: Upper deck: 26 × 12-pounder guns; QD: 4 × 6-pounders + 4 × 18-pounder carronades; Fc: 2 × 6-pounders + 2 × 18-pounder carronades

HMS Amphion was a Royal Navy 32-gun fifth-rate frigate of the Amazon class built in Chatham in 1780 which blew up on 22 September 1796.

== Service ==
On 6 September 1781, a small squadron under the command of Amphion's captain, John Bazely, in conjunction with General Benedict Arnold, completely destroyed the town of New London, Connecticut, together with stores and shipping in the harbour.

On 3 January 1782 Amphion recaptured the British sloop Bonetta, which the French had captured at the capitulation of Yorktown on 19 October 1781.

== Sinking ==
On 22 September 1796, Amphion was completing repairs at Plymouth, England. She was lying alongside a sheer hulk close to the dockyard jetty. Being due to sail the next day, she had more than a hundred relatives and visitors on board in addition to her crew.

At about 4 p.m. she exploded without warning, killing 300 out of the 312 aboard. Among the few survivors was her captain, Israel Pellew, who went on to command a ship at the Battle of Trafalgar and ended the Napoleonic Wars as a Rear-Admiral. Pellew had been dining in his cabin with Captain Swaffield of Overyssel and the first lieutenant of Amphion when the explosion threw them about; Pellew managed to rush to the cabin window before a second explosion blew him into the water, whence he was rescued.

Apart from Pellew, two lieutenants, a boatswain, three or four seamen, a marine, one woman, and a child were the only survivors.

The cause of the disaster was never fully proven, but it was thought that the ship's gunner had accidentally spilled gunpowder near the fore magazine which had then accidentally ignited and set off the magazine itself. The gunner had been suspected of stealing gunpowder, and on the day of the disaster he was reported to have been drunk and probably as a result less careful than usual.

In 1864, William O. S. Gilly's published collection of shipwreck accounts, relating to the period between 1793 and 1857. Amongst other details about this disaster, he notes (reported in www.devonheritage.org/Places/Plymouth/TheAmphionDisasteratPlymouth2September1796.htm): "The preservation of a child was no less singular. In the terror of the moment, the mother had grasped it in her arms, but, horrible to relate, the lower part of her body was blown to pieces, whilst the upper part remained unhurt, and it was discovered with the arms still clasping the living child to her lifeless bosom. One of the survivors took care of the child who had been found alive and he was entered into the Navy as soon as he was old enough. He is said to have had a long and successful career in the Royal Navy." This was later used by Elizabeth Goudge in her 1950 novel, Gentian Hill, set in Devon around 1804. In her Note at the start of the novel, Goudge acknowledged the historical events of the Amphion exploding, and the Venerable being sunk in a storm. However, Goudge's novel changes that surviving boy child into her central character, Stella. She allots the career in the navy to her other main character, Anthony O'Connell.
