= HMS Conqueror (1801) =

Ship of the line of the Royal Navy

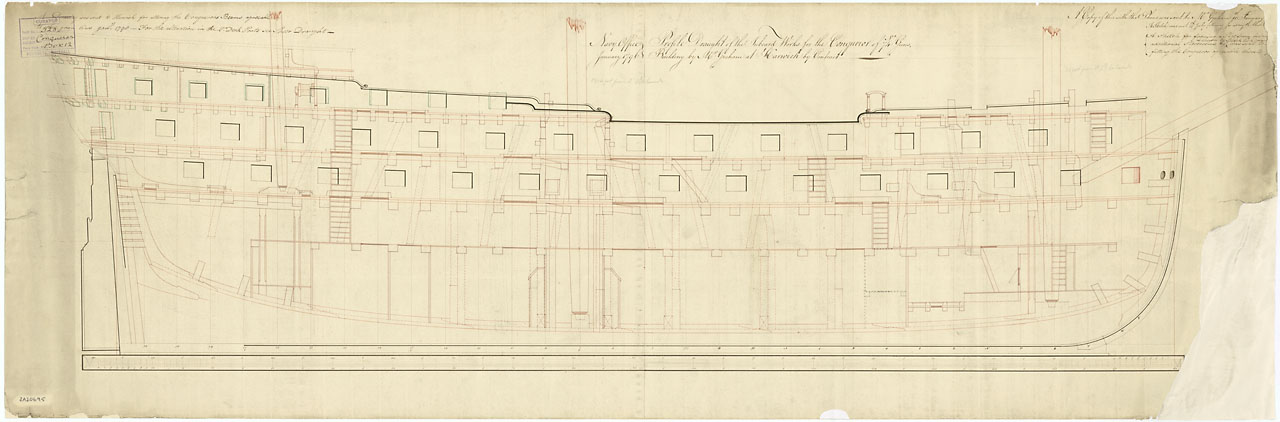
- Conqueror

History

United Kingdom
- Name: Conqueror
- Ordered: 10 June 1795
- Builder: Graham, Harwich
- Laid down: October 1795
- Launched: 23 November 1801
- Fate: Broken up 1822
- Notes: Participated in: Battle of Trafalgar

General characteristics
- Class & type: 74-gun third rate ship of the line
- Tons burthen: 1854 (bm)
- Length: 176 ft (54 m) (gundeck)
- Beam: 49 ft (15 m)
- Depth of hold: 20 ft 9 in (6.32 m)
- Propulsion: Sails
- Sail plan: Full-rigged ship
- Armament: GD: 28 × 32-pounder guns; Upper GD: 30 × 18-pounder guns; QD: 12 × 9-pounder guns; Fc: 4 × 9-pounder guns

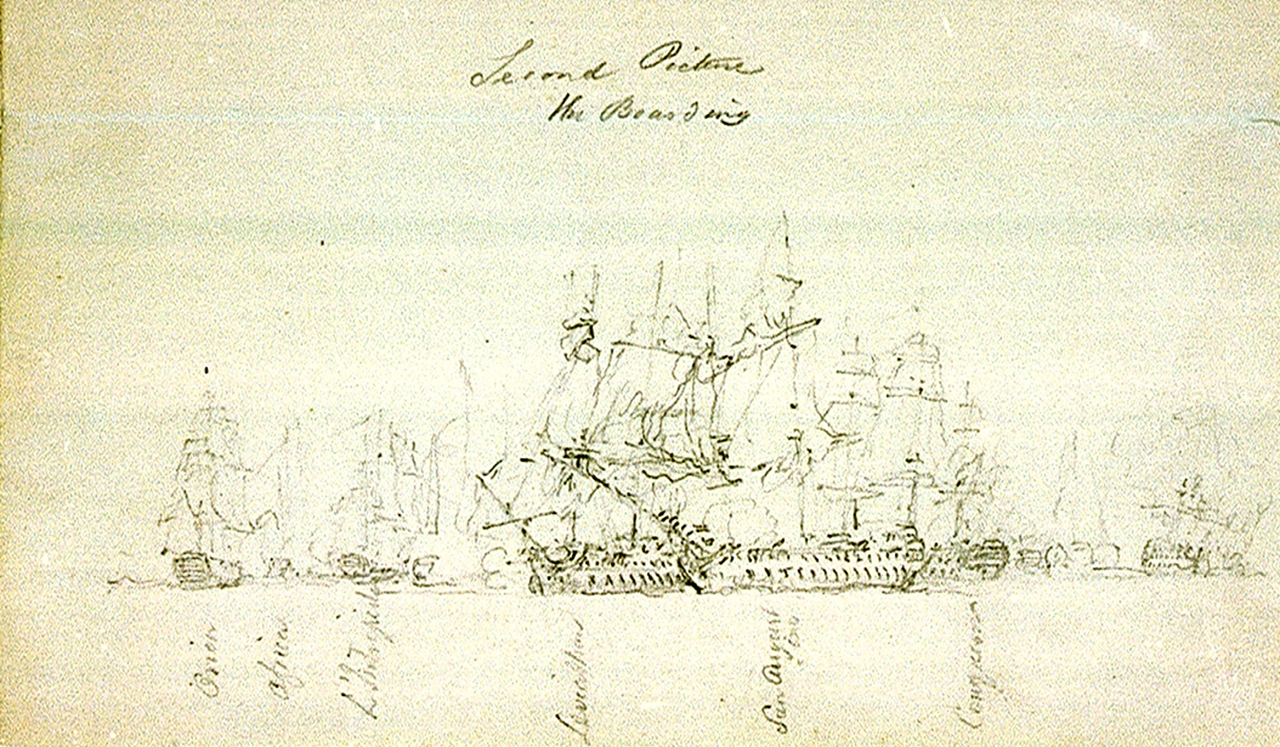
Sketch showing Conqueror at the Battle of Trafalgar, 21 October 1805

HMS Conqueror was a 74-gun third-rate ship of the line of the Royal Navy, launched on 23 November 1801 at Harwich. She was designed by Sir John Henslow as part of the middling class of 74s, and was the only ship built to her draught. Whereas the common class carried 28 18-pounder guns on their upper gun decks, the middling class carried 30, and only ten 9-pounder guns on their quarterdecks instead of the 12 of the common class.

She fought at Trafalgar under the command of Captain Israel Pellew, brother of Sir Edward Pellew. Pellew's captain of marines took the surrender of the overall commander of the French-Spanish fleet, Admiral Villeneuve, aboard the French ship Bucentaure (80 guns). However, he was not able to deliver Villeneuve's sword to the Conqueror as she had passed on to engage another ship and it was received by the captain of Mars.

Villeneuve, who spoke English, is alleged to have asked to whom he was surrendering. On being told it was Captain Pellew of the Conqueror, he replied "I am glad to have struck to the fortunate Sir Edward Pellew." When he was informed that the Conqueror's captain was Sir Edward's brother, he said, "His brother? What, are there two of them? Hėlas!"

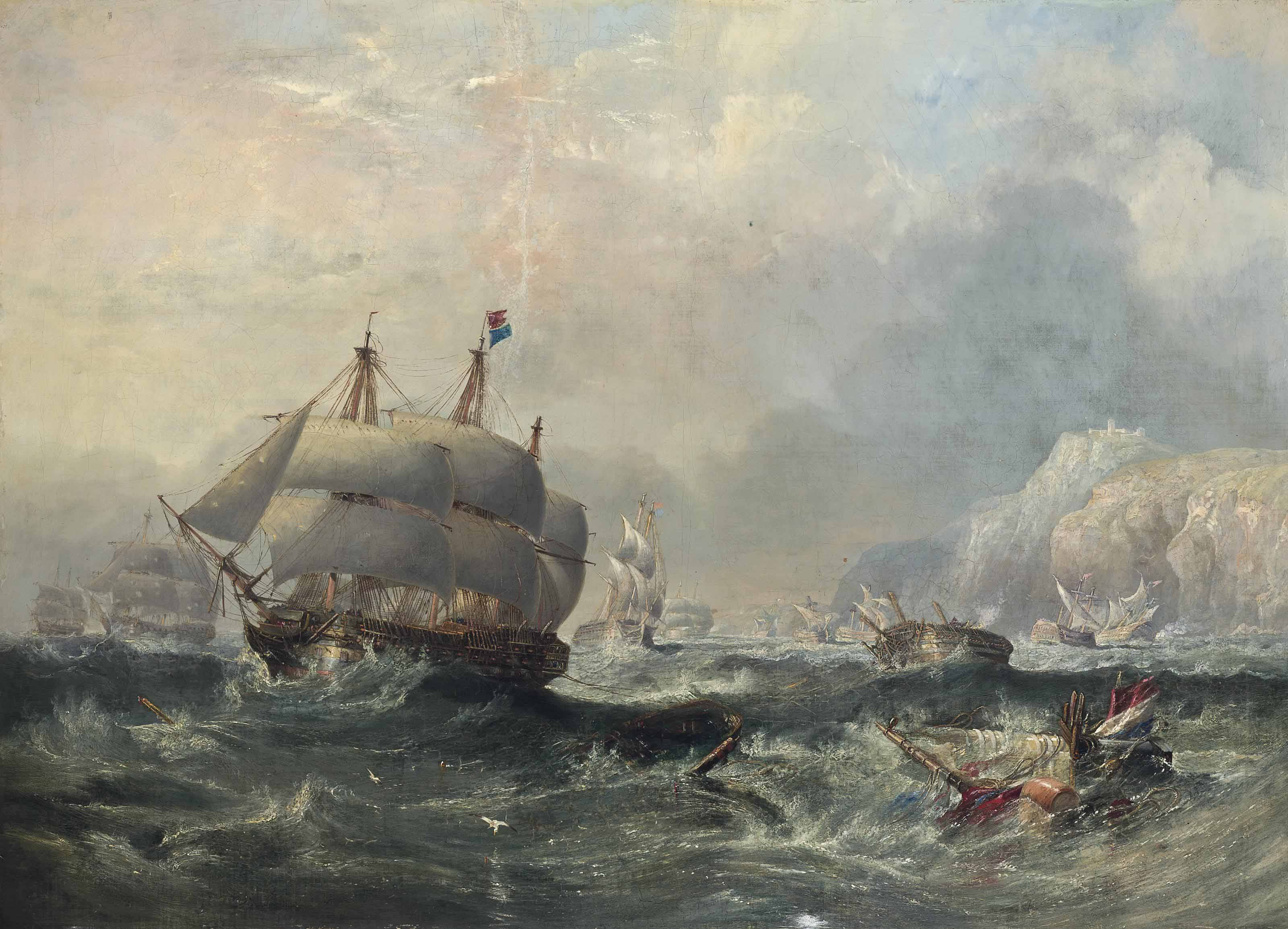
Conqueror towing HMS Africa off the shoals at Trafalgar, three days after the battle, painting by James Wilson Carmichael

On 2 February 1812, Conqueror was driven ashore on the coast of England between Sheerness and Chatham, Kent, during a storm.

Conqueror was broken up in 1822.
