= Edward Pellew, 1st Viscount Exmouth =

Royal Navy officer and politician (1757–1833)

Admiral The Right Honourable The Viscount Exmouth GCB
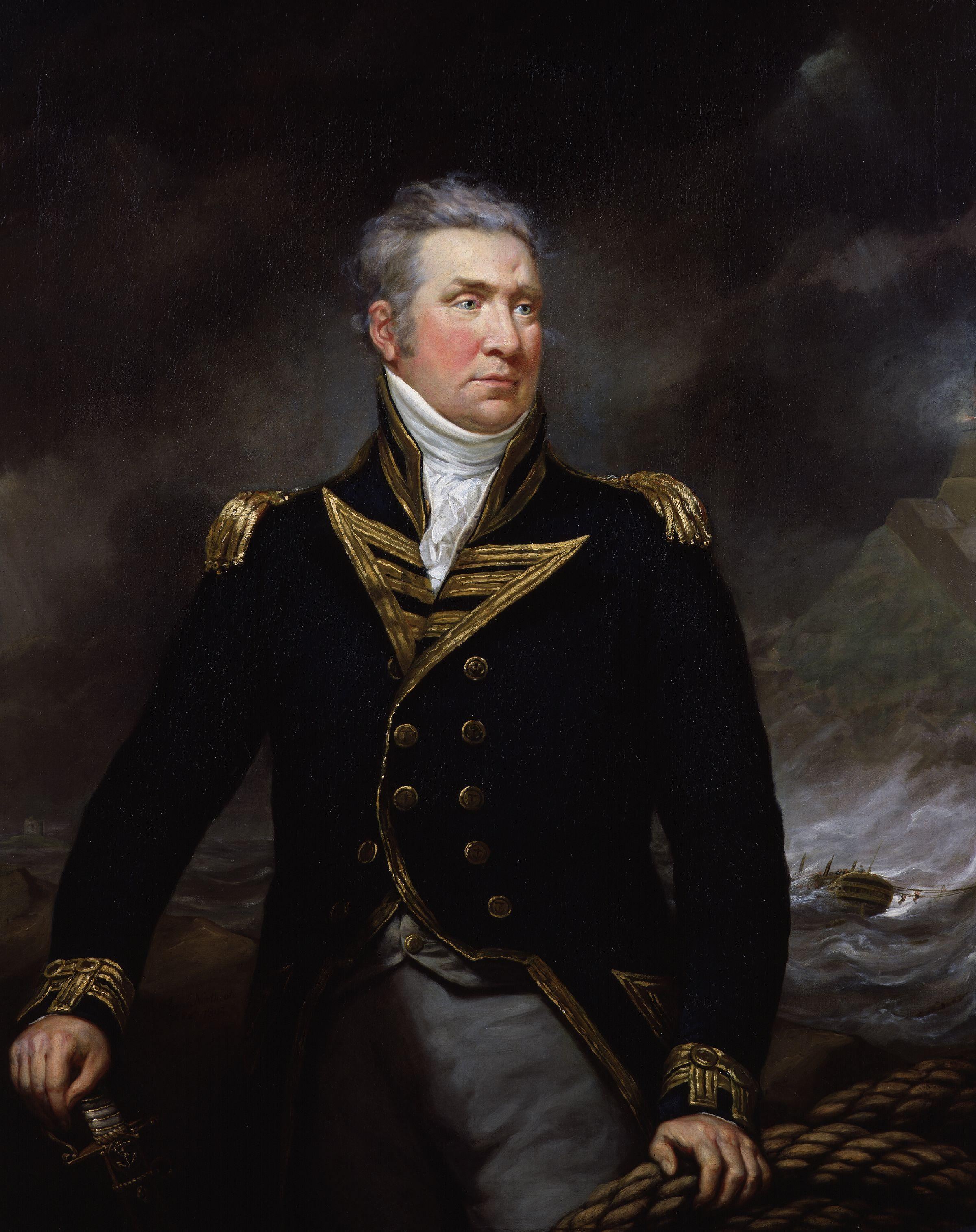
- Portrait by James Northcote, 1804
- Born: 19 April 1757; Dover, England
- Died: 23 January 1833 (aged 75); Teignmouth, Devon
- Relatives: Israel Pellew (brother)
- Military career
- Allegiance: Great Britain; United Kingdom
- Branch: Royal Navy
- Service years: 1770–1833
- Rank: Admiral of the Red
- Commands: Commander-in-Chief, East Indies; Mediterranean Fleet; Commander-in-Chief, Plymouth
- Conflicts: American War of Independence; French Revolutionary Wars; Napoleonic Wars; Second Barbary War
- Awards: Knight Grand Cross of the Order of the Bath

Admiral of the Red Edward Pellew, 1st Viscount Exmouth, GCB (19 April 1757 – 23 January 1833) was a Royal Navy officer and politician. He fought during the American War of Independence, the French Revolutionary Wars, and the Napoleonic Wars. His younger brother Israel Pellew also pursued a naval career.

== Childhood ==
Pellew was born at Dover, the second son of Samuel Pellew (1712–1764), commander of a Dover packet, and his wife, Constantia Langford.

The Pellew family was Cornish, descended from a family that came originally from Normandy, but had for many centuries been settled in the west of Cornwall. Edward's grandfather, Humphrey Pellew (1650–1721), a merchant and ship owner, son of a naval officer, resided at Flushing manor-house in the parish of Mylor. Part of the town of Flushing was built by Samuel Trefusis, MP for Penryn; the other part was built by Humphrey Pellew, who was buried there. He also had a property and a tobacco plantation in Maryland. Part of the town of Annapolis stands on what was, before the American Revolution, the estate of the Pellews.

On the death of Edward's father in 1764 the family removed to Penzance, and Pellew was educated for some years at Truro Grammar School. He was a pugnacious youth, which did not endear him to his headmaster. He ran away to sea at the age of 14, but soon deserted because of unfair treatment to another midshipman. Pellew described himself as "pock-marked, ugly, uninteresting and uneducated"; a naval historian adds that he was "tough, brave, skilful, lucky, and unscrupulous".

== Early career ==
=== 1770s ===
In 1770, Pellew entered the Royal Navy on board HMS Juno with Captain John Stott, and made a voyage to the Falkland Islands. In 1772, he followed Stott to HMS Alarm and in her was in the Mediterranean for three years. In consequence of a high-spirited quarrel with his captain, he was put on shore at Marseille where he found an old friend of his father's in command of a merchant ship. He was able to get a passage to Lisbon and so home.

He was later in HMS Blonde, under the command of Captain Philemon Pownoll, which took General John Burgoyne to America in the spring of 1776. In October, Pellew and midshipman Brown were detached for service in the Carleton tender on Lake Champlain, under Lieutenant Dacres. During the Battle of Valcour Island on 11 October, Dacres and Brown were both severely wounded, and the command devolved on Pellew. Pellew extricated the vessel from a position of great danger by his personal gallantry. As a reward for his service, he was immediately appointed to command the Carleton. In December, Lord Howe promised him a commission as lieutenant when he could reach New York, and in the following January Lord Sandwich wrote promising to promote him when he came to England. In the summer of 1777, Pellew and a small party of seamen were attached to the army under Burgoyne, and he was present in the fighting at Saratoga, where his youngest brother John was killed. He and the rest of the force were taken prisoner. After the surrender of Burgoyne at Saratoga, he was repatriated.

He returned to England and was promoted on 9 January 1778 to be lieutenant of the Princess Amelia guardship at Portsmouth. He wanted to be appointed to a seagoing ship, but Lord Sandwich considered that he was bound by the terms of the surrender at Saratoga not to undertake any active service. Towards the end of the year, he was appointed to the Licorne which went out to Newfoundland in the spring of 1779, returning in the winter, when Pellew was moved into the Apollo with his old captain Pownoll. On 15 June 1780, the Apollo engaged a large French privateer, the Stanislaus, off Ostend. Pownoll was killed alongside 5 crewmen but Pellew continued the action and dismasted the Stanislaus, driving her on shore where she was protected by the neutrality of the coast. On the 18th, Lord Sandwich wrote to him: "I will not delay informing you that I mean to give you immediate promotion as a reward for your gallant and officer-like conduct." On 1 July, he was accordingly promoted to the command of the sloop Hazard, which was employed for the next six months on the east coast of Scotland and was then paid off.

=== Peacetime service ===
In March 1782 Pellew was appointed to the Pelican, a small French prize, so small indeed that he used to say "his servant could dress his hair from the deck while he sat in the cabin." On 28 April while cruising on the coast of Brittany, he engaged three privateers and drove them on shore. In special reward for this service, he was promoted to post rank on 25 May and, ten days later, was appointed to the temporary command of the Artois, in which he captured a large frigate-built privateer on 1 July.

From 1786 to 1789, he commanded the frigate Winchelsea under the Commander-in-Chief, Newfoundland, returning home each winter by Cádiz and Lisbon. Afterwards, he commanded the Salisbury on the same station as flag-captain to Vice-Admiral Milbanke. In 1791, he was placed on half-pay and tried his hand at farming on Treverry Farm near Helston, a property owned by his brother who was a senior customs officer of Flushing. This met with indifferent success, during which time he attempted to sell a bull, only to find that it was in the ownership of a neighbouring farmer.

The Russians offered him a command in the Russian navy but Pellew declined the offer. He was still struggling with the difficulties of his farm when the revolutionary government of France declared war on Great Britain on 1 February 1793.

=== Wartime service ===
Pellew immediately applied for a ship and was appointed to the Nymphe, a 36-gun frigate which he fitted out in a remarkably short time. He had expected a good deal of difficulty in manning her and had enlisted some 80 Cornish miners who were sent round to the ship at Spithead. He put to sea with these and about a dozen seamen, plus officers who were obliged to help in the work aloft. He filled his complement of crew by pressing from the merchant ships in the Channel, but with very few seasoned navy men. On 18 June, Nymphe sailed from Falmouth on the news that two French frigates had been seen in the Channel.

At the action of 18 June 1793, Nymphe fell in with the Cléopâtre, also of 36 guns and commanded by Captain Jean Mullon, one of the few officers of the ancien régime who still remained in the French navy. After a short but very sharp action, Cléopâtre's mizzenmast and wheel were shot away, making the ship unmanageable, and it fell foul of the Nymphe. Pellew's crew boarded her in a fierce rush and captured her. Mullon was mortally wounded, and died trying to swallow his commission, which in his dying agony he had mistaken for the code of secret signals. The code thus fell intact into Pellew's hands, and was forwarded to the Admiralty. Cléopâtre was the first frigate taken in the war and was brought to Portsmouth. The Earl of Chatham presented Pellew to the king on 29 June, and the king knighted him.

Pellew transferred to HMS Arethusa in December 1793. In 1794, Arethusa was part of the western squadron of frigates based at Falmouth under Sir John Borlase Warren. On 23 April, the squadron engaged a French squadron to the southwest of Guernsey, the stronger British force quickly overpowering their opponents in an action where Arethusa played the primary role in fighting the Pomone, at the time the largest frigate in service. Pomone surrendered after an engagement that lasted less than half an hour. The French had suffered between 80 and 100 casualties; Arethusa had only three dead and five wounded. Warren's squadron went on to destroy one frigate and capture another. They also drove ashore the corvettes Alerte and Espion, both of which had been Royal Navy sloops. Pellew refused to burn either ship, as they contained wounded men, and the French later refloated Espion. The squadron also captured many vessels from French coastal convoys.

== Service in the French Revolutionary War ==
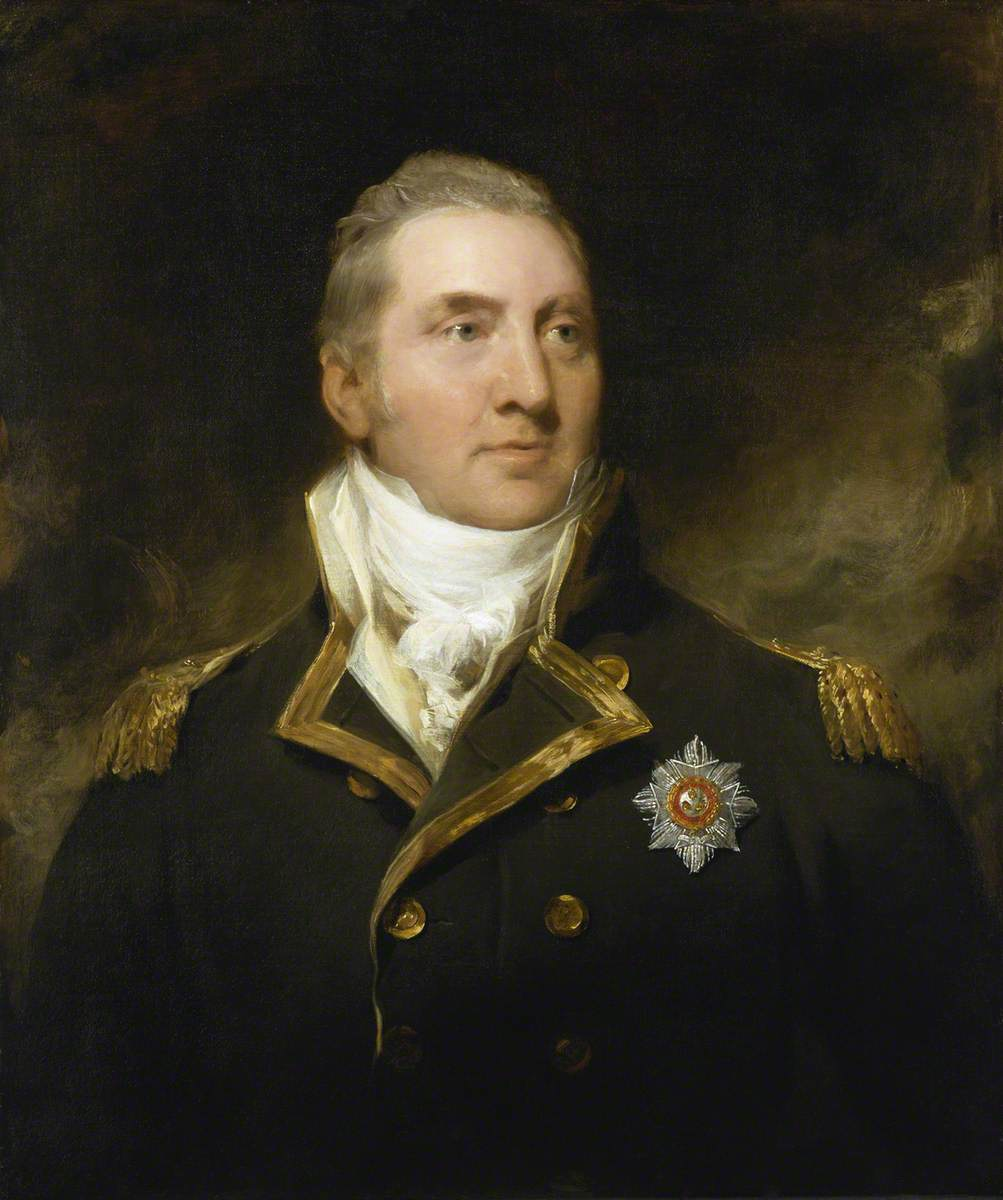
Portrait of Sir Edward Pellew by Sir Thomas Lawrence, 1797

By 1794, he was commodore of the Western Squadron. In 1795, he took command of HMS Indefatigable, the ship with which he is most closely associated. The squadron also comprised the frigates HMS Argo, HMS Concord, HMS Révolutionnaire, and HMS Amazon.

He was a good swimmer and noted for saving the lives of several seamen who had fallen overboard. The most striking life-saving event was on 26 January 1796 when the East Indiaman Dutton was carrying more than four hundred troops, together with many women and children, when it ran aground under Plymouth Hoe. Due to the heavy seas, the crew and soldiers aboard were unable to get to shore. Pellew swam out to the wreck with a line and, with help from Lieutenant Jeremiah Coghlan, helped rig a lifeline that saved almost all aboard. For this feat he was created a baronet on 18 March 1796.

On 13 April 1796, off the coasts of Ireland, his squadron captured the French frigate Unité, and the Virginie nine days later.

His most noted action was the action of 13 January 1797, cruising in company with HMS Amazon, when the British sighted the French 74-gun ship of the line Droits de l'Homme. Normally, a ship of the line would over-match two frigates, but the Indefatigable was a razée (built as a 3rd rate 64-gun ship of the line and then cut down), the stormy conditions limited the use of the lower gun deck on the French ship and by skillful sailing in the stormy conditions, the frigates avoided bearing the brunt of the superior firepower of the French. In the early morning of 14 January, the three ships were embayed on a lee shore in Audierne Bay. Both the Droits de l'Homme and Amazon ran aground, but Indefatigable managed to claw her way off the lee shore to safety.

Pellew was also responsible for pressing young violinist and composer Joseph Antonio Emidy, who had been playing in the Lisbon Opera orchestra.

== Admiralcy and peerage ==
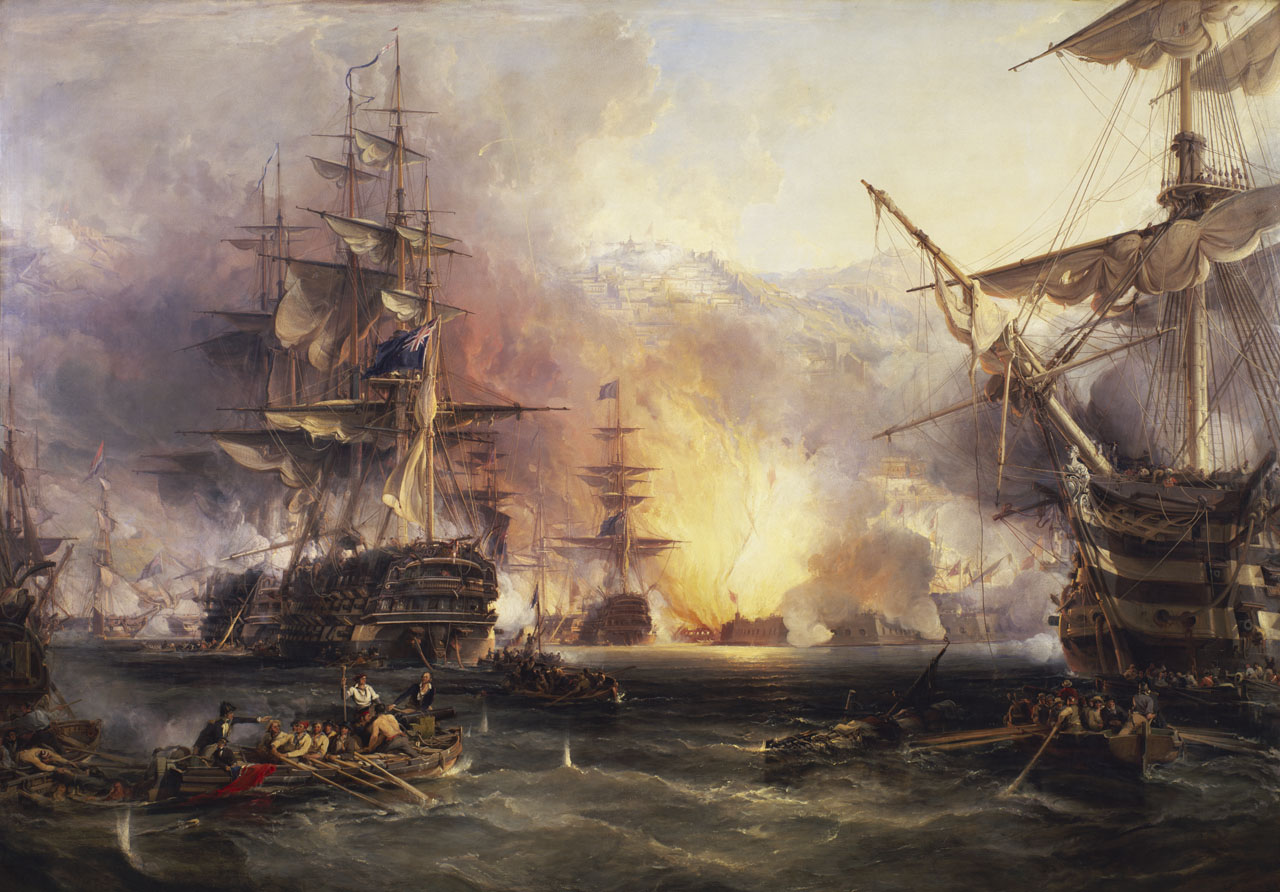
Painting of the Bombardment of Algiers by George Chambers Sr.

Pellew was promoted to rear admiral in 1804. He was then appointed Commander-in-Chief, East Indies. It took six months to sail out to Penang, so he took up the appointment in 1805.

When in February 1808 Pellew was at sea in his flagship, HMS Culloden, he heard of the outbreak of war between the United Kingdom and Denmark. He immediately sailed to the Danish settlement at Tranquebar, taking it by surprise. When Admiral Drury arrived to replace Pellew as C-in-C, East Indies, and to seize Tranquebar, he found that he was too late. Pellew's seizing the moment gained him some £40,000–50,000 in prize money.

Following his return from the east in 1809, he was appointed to the position of Commander-in-Chief, North Sea from 1810 to 1811 and Commander-in-Chief, Mediterranean, from 1811 to 1814, and again from 1815 to 1816.

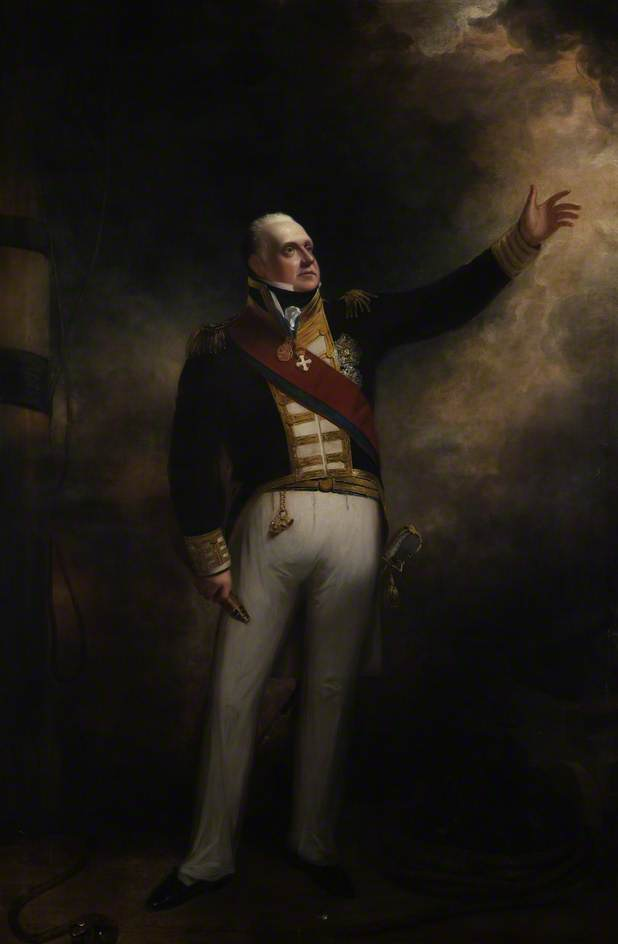
Lord Exmouth during the Bombardment of Algiers by William Beechey, 1817.

In 1814, he was made Baron Exmouth of Canonteign. In 1816, he led an Anglo-Dutch fleet against the Barbary states. Victory at the Bombardment of Algiers secured the release of the 1,200 Christian slaves in the city. For this action, he was created 1st Viscount Exmouth on 10 December 1816. Following his return to England, he became Commander-in-Chief, Plymouth from 1817 to 1821, when he effectively retired from active service. He continued to attend and speak in the House of Lords. In 1832, he was appointed Vice-Admiral of the United Kingdom, Admiral of the Red, Knight Grand Cross of the Order of the Bath, the Order of Charles III, the Military Order of William, the Order of Saint Ferdinand and of Merit, the Order of St Maurice and St Lazarus, Knight of the Order of the Annunziata, High Steward of Great Yarmouth, and one of the Elder Brethren of Trinity House.

He bought Bitton House in Teignmouth in 1812 and it was his home until his death in 1833. He was buried in Christow on the eastern edge of Dartmoor on 30 Jan 1833. A note on the parish burial record states, "No Singing, No Sermon". The museum in Teignmouth has a comprehensive collection of artefacts that belonged to him.

== Marriage and family ==
On 28 May 1783, Pellew married Susan Frowde. They had four sons and two daughters. These children were:

- Emma Mary Pellew (18 January 1785 – March 1835). Married Captain Lawrence Halsted in December 1803.
- Pownoll Bastard Pellew, later 2nd Viscount Exmouth (1 July 1786 – 2 December 1833)
- Julia Pellew (28 November 1787 – 26 December 1831)
- Fleetwood Broughton Reynolds Pellew, later an admiral and knight (13 December 1789 – 28 July 1861)
- George Pellew, Dean of Norwich (3 April 1793 – 13 October 1866)
- Edward William Pellew, later a minister (3 November 1799 – 29 August 1869), whose daughter Frances Helen Pellew married Sir Louis Mallet

== Geographical namesakes ==
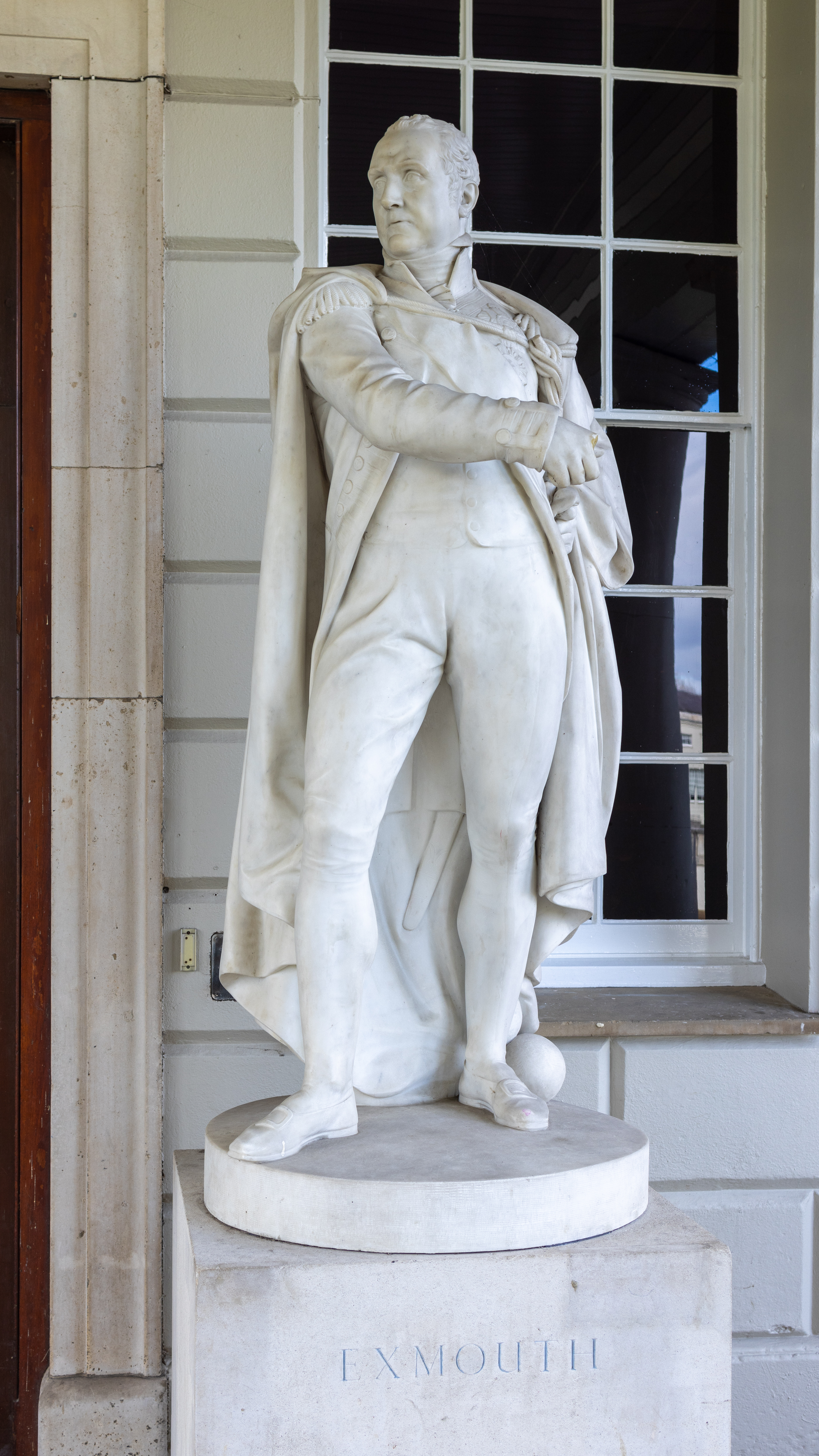
Statue of Pellew by Patrick MacDowell at the National Maritime Museum, Greenwich.

The Sir Edward Pellew Group of Islands situated in the Gulf of Carpentaria were named after Pellew by Matthew Flinders, who visited them in 1802. Other Australian geographical features include Cape Pellew (adjacent to the islands) and Exmouth Gulf.

Point Pellew, Alaska was named after Pellew by Captain George Vancouver during his expedition in 1794.

Palau (formerly the Pellew or Pelew Islands), east of the Philippines, is often said to be named for Edward Pellew, but it was called that by Captain Henry Wilson in 1783 which was well before Pellew came to prominence. It appears to be an anglicization of the indigenous name Belau.

There is also a building named after him in HMS Raleigh, where Naval basic training is conducted, that is used as sleeping quarters for new recruits. Additionally, a Sea Cadet Unit in Truro is called T.S. Pellew.

A building at Wyvern Barracks in Exeter, Devon is used as a temporary billet and a training facility for the Army Cadet force as well as other units. It was handed over to the army from the navy. However, it retains the name Pellew House in memory of Sir Edward Pellew, 1st Viscount Exmouth.

== Fictional appearances ==
Pellew is featured as the Captain of Indefatigable in some of C. S. Forester's fictional Horatio Hornblower novels. In the television adaptations, he is portrayed by Robert Lindsay and given a more prominent role. He appears as a midshipman in the novel Jack Absolute by Chris Humphreys. Pellew is the name of a minor character in several of Patrick O'Brian's Aubrey–Maturin novels, including The Reverse of the Medal and The Surgeon's Mate.

He has a small role as a captain in the American Revolution in Rabble in Arms, a historical novel by Kenneth Roberts. He appears in Alexander Kent's Adam Bolitho novel Relentless Pursuit, which partially relates to Pellew's expedition against the Barbary States. He also appears in the twenty-second Thomas Kydd novel, To The Eastern Seas by Julian Stockwin.

== Arms ==
Coat of arms of Edward Pellew, 1st Viscount Exmouth
Crest Upon the waves of the sea the wreck of the Dutton East Indianman upon a rocky shore off Plymouth garrison all Proper. Escutcheon Gules a lion passant guardant in chief two chaplets of laurel Or on a chief of augmentation wavy a representation of Algiers with a British Man-of-War before it all Proper. Supporters Dexter a lion rampant guardant Or navally crowned Azure resting the dexter paw upon a decrescent Argent, sinister a male figure representing slavery trowsers Argent striped Azure the upper part of the body naked holding in the dexter hand broken chains Proper the sinister arm elevated and holding a cross Or. Motto Deo Adjuvante (over the crest), Algiers (under the shield)

== Notes ==
Parliament of the United Kingdom
Preceded by John Clevland; Richard Wilson	Member of Parliament for Barnstaple; 1802–1804; With: William Devaynes	Succeeded by William Devaynes; Viscount Ebrington
Military offices
Preceded by Peter Rainier	Commander-in-Chief, East Indies Station (jointly with Thomas Troubridge); 1804–1809	Succeeded by William O'Bryen Drury
Preceded by Sir Richard Strachan	Commander-in-Chief, North Sea; 1810–1811	Succeeded by Sir William Young
Preceded by Sir Charles Cotton	Commander-in-Chief, Mediterranean Fleet; 1811–1814	Succeeded by Sir Charles Penrose
Preceded by Sir Charles Penrose	Commander-in-Chief, Mediterranean Fleet; 1815–1816	Succeeded by Sir Charles Penrose
Preceded by Sir John Duckworth	Commander-in-Chief, Plymouth; 1817–1821	Succeeded by Sir Alexander Cochrane
Honorary titles
Preceded by The Lord de Saumarez	Vice-Admiral of the United Kingdom; 1832–1833	Succeeded by Sir Edward Thornbrough
Peerage of the United Kingdom
New creation	Viscount Exmouth; 1816–1833	Succeeded by Pownoll Pellew
New creation	Baron Exmouth; 1814–1833	Succeeded by Pownoll Pellew
Baronetage of Great Britain
New creation	Baronet (of Treverry); 1796–1833	Succeeded by Pownoll Pellew
