= Pierre-Charles Villeneuve =

French Navy officer (1763–1806)

Vice Admiral Pierre-Charles Villeneuve
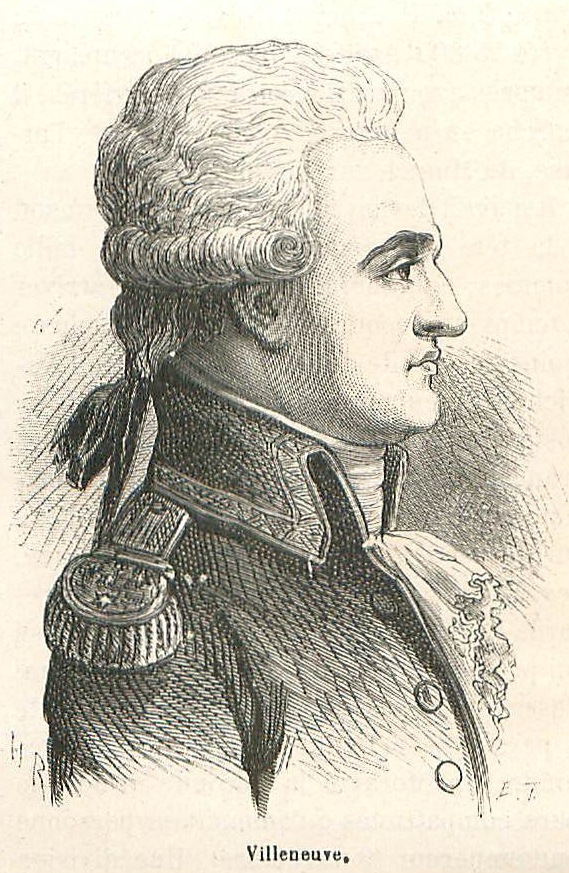
- Portrait of Villeneuve
- Born: 31 December 1763; Valensole, Provence
- Died: 22 April 1806 (aged 42); Rennes, Brittany
- Military career
- Allegiance: Kingdom of France; French First Republic; First French Empire
- Branch: French Navy; French Imperial Navy
- Service years: 1779–1806
- Rank: Vice admiral
- Commands: Guillaume Tell; Bucentaure
- Conflicts: American Revolutionary War; Battle of Fort Royal; French Revolutionary Wars; Battle of the Nile; Siege of Malta (1798–1800); War of the Third Coalition; Battle of Cape Finisterre (1805); Battle of Trafalgar (POW)

Vice-Admiral Pierre-Charles-Jean-Baptiste-Silvestre de Villeneuve (31 December 1763 – 22 April 1806) was a French Navy officer who served in the French Revolutionary and Napoleonic Wars. He was in command of a Franco-Spanish fleet which was defeated by the British Royal Navy at the Battle of Trafalgar in 1805.

== Early career ==
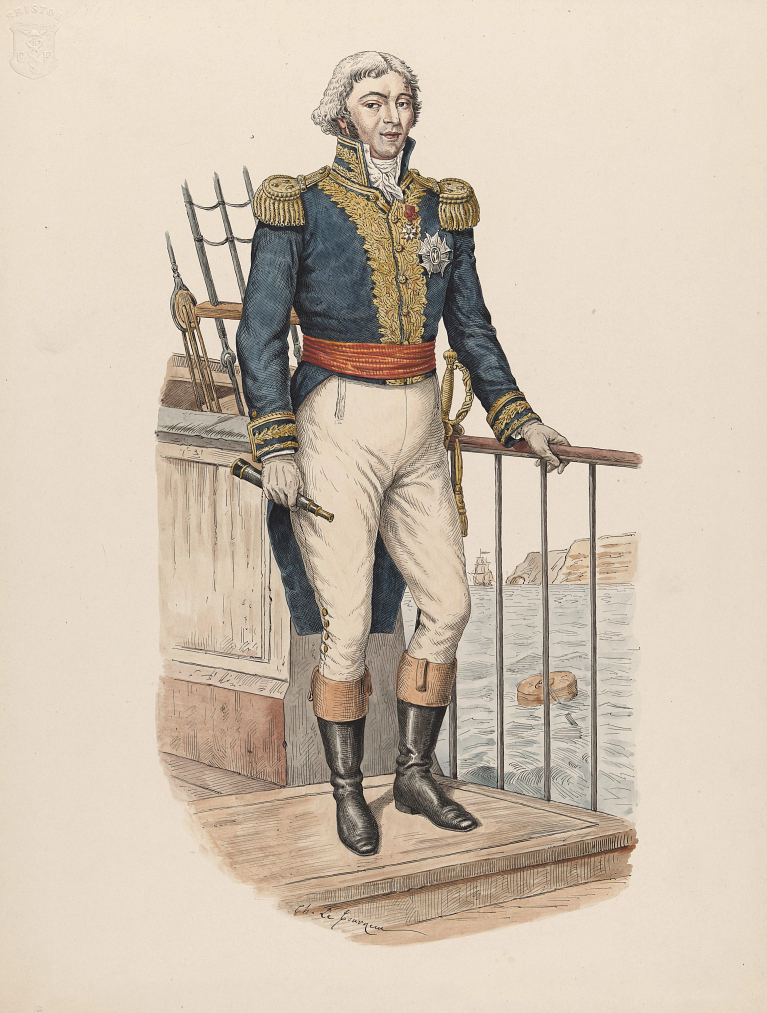
1850 portrait of Villeneuve

Pierre-Charles Villeneuve was born on 31 December 1763 at Valensole, Provence. He joined the French Navy in 1779, and took part in naval operations in the American Revolutionary War, serving as a ship-of-the-line ensign on Marseillois in François Joseph Paul de Grasse's fleet. Despite his aristocratic ancestry, Villeneuve sympathised with the French Revolution; dropping the nobiliary particle from his name, he was able to continue serving in the French navy when other aristocratic naval officers were purged. Villeneuve fought in several naval battles of the War of the First Coalition, and was promoted to counter admiral in 1796.

Villeneuve participated in the French invasion of Egypt and Syria in 1798; at the Battle of the Nile, he was in command of the French rear division. His ship, Guillaume Tell, was one of only two French ships of the line to escape the defeat. Villeneuve was subsequently captured by the British during the siege of Malta, but he was soon released. Though Villeneuve was criticised for not engaging the British at the Battle of the Nile, Napoleon considered him a "lucky man" and his career was not affected.

In 1804, Napoleon ordered Villeneuve, now a vice admiral stationed at Toulon, to slip past the British blockade, overcome the Royal Navy's Channel Squadron and allow Napoleon's planned invasion of the United Kingdom to take place. To draw off the Channel Squadron, Villeneuve was to sail to the West Indies, where he would combine forces with the Spanish Navy and the French fleet at Brest and attack the British West Indies before returning across the Atlantic and destroying the Channel Squadron and escort the Army of the Ocean Coasts from their camp at Boulogne to invade England.

== Battle of Trafalgar ==
=== Prelude to the battle ===
After an abortive expedition in January, Villeneuve finally left Toulon on 29 March 1805 with eleven ships of the line. He evaded Nelson's blockade, passed the Strait of Gibraltar on 8 April and crossed the Atlantic with Nelson's fleet in pursuit, but about a month behind owing to unfavourable winds. In the West Indies Villeneuve waited for a month at Martinique, but Admiral Ganteaume's Brest fleet did not appear. Eventually Villeneuve was pressured by French army officers into beginning the planned attack on the British, but he succeeded only in recapturing the island fort of Diamond Rock off Martinique. On 7 June he learned that Nelson had reached Antigua. On 8 June he and his fleet were able to intercept a homeward-bound convoy of 15 British merchant vessels escorted by the frigate HMS Barbadoes and the sloop or schooner HMS Netley. The two British warships managed to escape, but Villeneuve's fleet captured the entire convoy, valued at some five million pounds. Villeneuve then sent the prizes into Guadeloupe under the escort of the frigate Sirène. On 11 June Villeneuve set out for Europe with Nelson again in pursuit.

On 22 July Villeneuve, now with twenty ships of the line and seven frigates, passed Cape Finisterre on the northwest coast of Spain and entered the Bay of Biscay. Here he met a British fleet of fifteen ships of the line commanded by Vice Admiral Sir Robert Calder. In the ensuing Battle of Cape Finisterre, a confused action in bad visibility, the British, though outnumbered, were able to cut off and capture two Spanish ships.

For two days Villeneuve shadowed the retreating British, but did not seek a battle. Instead he sailed to A Coruña, arriving on 1 August. Here he received orders from Napoleon to sail to Brest and Boulogne as planned. Instead, perhaps believing a false report of a superior British fleet in the Bay of Biscay, and against the Spanish commanders' objections, he sailed away back to Cádiz, rendering Napoleon's planned invasion of Britain wholly impossible.

=== The battle ===
At Cádiz the combined French and Spanish fleets were kept under blockade by Nelson. Nelson arriving off Cadiz on the 28th September. In September, Villeneuve was ordered to sail for Naples and attack British shipping in the Mediterranean, but he was initially unwilling to move and continued in blatant disregard of superior orders.

In mid-October he learned that Napoleon was about to replace him as commanding officer with François Étienne de Rosily-Mesros and order him to Paris to account for his actions. (Napoleon had written to the Minister of Marine, "Villeneuve does not possess the strength of character to command a frigate. He lacks determination and has no moral courage.") Before his replacement could arrive, Villeneuve gave the order to sail on 18 October.

Inexperienced crews and the difficulties of getting out of Cádiz meant that it took two days to get all 34 ships out of port and into some kind of order. On 21 October 1805 Villeneuve learned of the size of the British fleet, and turned back to Cádiz, but the combined fleets were intercepted by Nelson off Cape Trafalgar. Nelson, though outnumbered, won the Battle of Trafalgar, and Villeneuve's flagship Bucentaure was captured along with many other French and Spanish ships.

== Aftermath and death ==
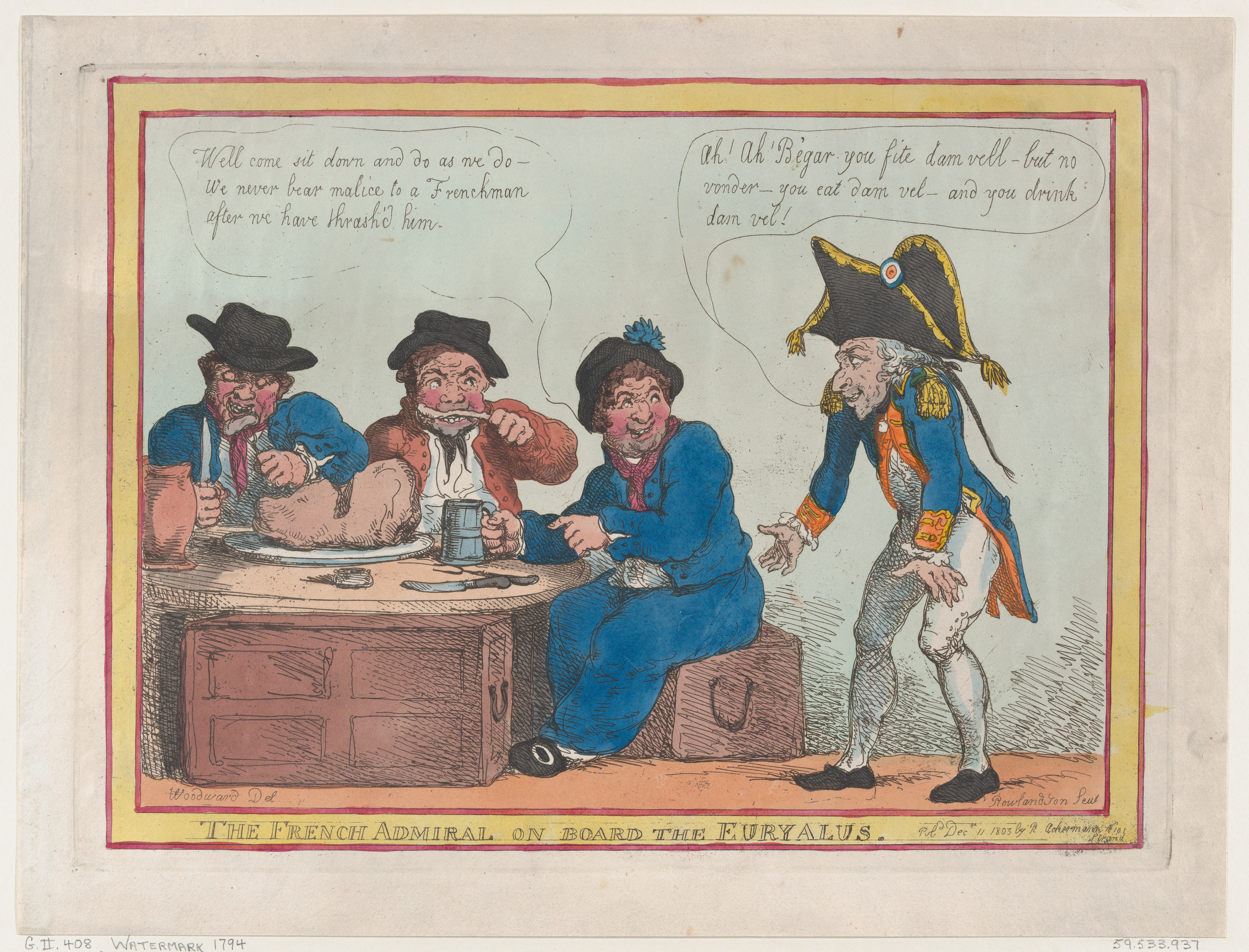
1805 cartoon of Villenueve onboard HMS Euryalus after Trafalgar

The British sent Villeneuve to England in HMS Euryalus but released him on parole; during this time he lived in Bishop's Waltham in Hampshire. He stayed at the Crown Inn public house and his men, who numbered 200, stayed in local houses. He was allowed to attend the funeral of Lord Nelson whilst at Bishop's Waltham. Freed in late 1805, he returned to France, where he attempted to go back into military service, but his requests were not answered.

On 22 April 1806, he was found dead at the Hôtel de la Patrie in Rennes with five stab wounds in the left lung and one in the heart. He had left a farewell letter to his wife. A verdict of suicide was recorded. The nature of his death ensured that this verdict was much mocked in the British press of the time and suspicions abounded that Napoleon had secretly ordered Villeneuve's murder. The question of whether Villeneuve committed suicide has been a source of contention among historians ever since.

== Legacy ==
His name is etched on the Arc de Triomphe.

== Sources ==
- James, William (1837). The Naval History of Great Britain, from the Declaration of War by France in 1793, to the Accession of George IV. R. Bentley.
