= HMS Childers (1778) =

Brig-sloop of the Royal Navy

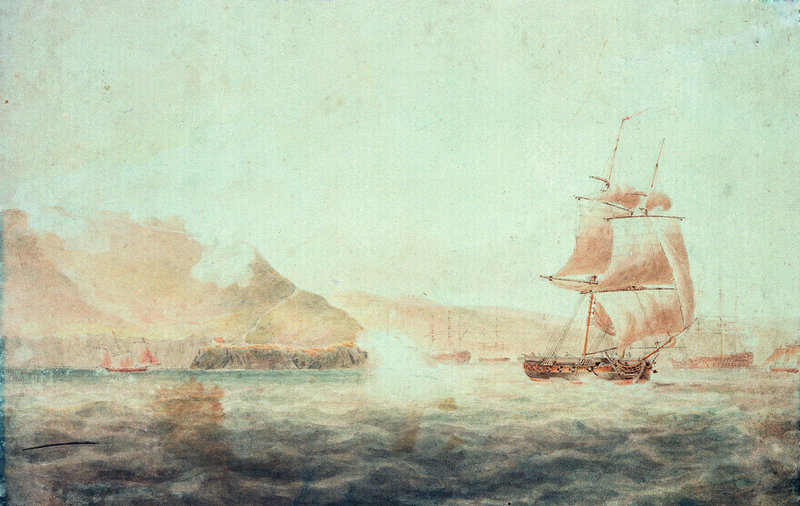
- French batteries firing at Childers off Brest (1793); National Maritime Museum

History

Great Britain
- Name: HMS Childers
- Ordered: 30 September 1777
- Builder: James Mentone & Son, Limehouse
- Laid down: 3 April 1778
- Launched: 7 September 1778
- Commissioned: October 1778
- Out of service: Paid off in January 1811
- Honours and awards: Naval General Service Medal with clasp "Childers 14 March 1808"
- Fate: Taken to pieces in February 1811

General characteristics
- Class & type: Childers-class brig-sloop
- Tons burthen: 20615/94 (bm)
- Length: 79 ft 0 in (24.1 m) (gundeck); 60 ft 9 1/2 in (18.5 m) (keel)
- Beam: 25 ft 3 in (7.7 m)
- Depth of hold: 10 ft 11 3/4 in (3.3 m)
- Propulsion: Sails
- Sail plan: Two masted brig-rigged
- Complement: 80
- Armament: 10 × 4-pounder guns (increased to 14 guns by 1793) + 12 × 1/2-pounder swivel guns; Later: 14 × 12-pounder carronades (Note: The Royal Navy started to replace 4-pounder and similar guns with carronades in the late 1700s. James reports that 18-pounder carronades were too heavy for Childers and that she received fourteen 12-pounder carronades instead.)

HMS Childers was a brig-sloop of the British Royal Navy, initially armed with 10 carriage guns which were later increased to 14 guns. The first brig-sloop to be built for the Navy, she was ordered from a commercial builder during the early years of the American War of Independence, and went on to support operations in the English Channel and the Caribbean. Laid up for a time after the end of the American War of Independence, she returned to service shortly before the outbreak of the French Revolutionary Wars. She had an active career in both the French Revolutionary and Napoleonic Wars, capturing numerous French privateers and during the Gunboat War participated in a noteworthy single-ship action. The navy withdrew her from service at the beginning of 1811, at which time she was broken up.

== Construction and commissioning ==
James Mentone, a notable builder of fast vessels at Limehouse, built Childers, one of only two vessels he built for the navy. Although the design was nominally attributed to the Surveyor of the Navy, Sir John Williams, it was approved beforehand on 16 July 1778 as "adopted from a current merchant ship design" and was probably prepared by Mentone before Williams adapted it to meet Admiralty needs. The lines and hull form were those normally found in cutters rather than in the conventional ship-rigged sloops with three masts then prevalent in British naval service. She was initially described as simply a "brig", but was re-registered and established as a sloop on 6 August 1779.

Launched in September 1778, she was commissioned in October under Commander William Peacock.

After the Admiral Rodney's victory at the battle of Cape St. Vincent, Childers, under the command of Captain M'Bride, brought back the dispatches to Britain. However, although she left ten days before Hyaena, which was carrying the duplicates, Hyaena arrived two days earlier.

== French Revolutionary War ==
Commander Robert Barlow recommissioned Childers in January 1791. At this time she was employed in the suppression of smuggling.

In 1793 Childers was involved in what became known as the Childers Incident at the start of the French Revolutionary Wars. Childers was the first British warship to be involved in hostilities with the Revolutionary French regime. On 2 January 1793, she was sailing the roadstead of Brest when the forts there fired on her, though only one shot struck her. The 48-pound shot hit a gun and split into three parts, but did not cause any casualties. France did not declare war on Britain until 1 February.

Childers captured the French privateer Patriote off the Graveline on 15 February. One month later, on 14 March she destroyed the French privateer Triton.

In June 1793 Commander Joshua Mullock took command of Childers. Commander Robert Warburton replaced Mullock in March 1794.

In March 1795 the newly promoted Commander Richard Dacres assumed command of Childers. Diamond, Syren, Sybille, Childers, and the gun-brigs Fearless and Attack shared in the proceeds of the capture on 6 July of the Latitia. In August Dacres and Childers sailed "with the squadron which was sent to convoy the transports to Quiberon Bay".

On 8 September 1795 Childers rejoined Admiral Sir William Sidney Smith in Diamond off the Rock Douvre, about eight leagues S by SW from Saint Martin's Point, Guernsey. On his way, Dacres captured the French Coast guard cutter Vigilant (or Vigilante), of six guns, in the Bay of Saint Brieux. This was on 3 September. (Note: Lloyd's List, reported that Childers had captured the privateer Vigilante, of six guns and eight swivel guns off the Île de Batz and brought her into Plymouth. Vigilant was one of two Sentinelle-class cutters, both launched at Saint-Malo in 1793. The Royal Navy did not take her into service.) The day before, Diamond had destroyed the French corvette Assemblee Nationale, and as part of Smith's squadron, Childers shared in the head money for the corvette.

Dacres was promoted to post captain and command of Camilla on 31 October. In December Command Stephen Poyntz assumed command of Childers.

On 10 April 1796 Diamond, Magicienne, Childers, Camilla, and Syren captured Smuka Piga. Nineteen days later, Aquilon, Diamond, Minerva, Syren, Magicienne, and Camilla, were together when Acquilon captured Mary. Childers shared in the prize money by agreement with Acquilon.

On 16 September Childers captured the French privateer Bon Esperence, off Cape Barfleur. Bon Esperence, of two swivel guns and 23 men, was three days out of Cherbourg and had captured the sloop Mary Ann, of Queenborough, sailing from Plymouth to London and Woolwich with naval stores and ordnance. Shortly thereafter, Childers was able to recapture the Mary Ann. Poyntz sent both Bon Esperence and Mary Ann into Portsmouth under escort by the cutter Trial. Towards the end of the month, on the 28th, Childers captured the ship Anna Louisa.

Melampus and Minerva drove a French navy corvette ashore near Barfleur on 13 November. However the British were not able to get close enough to assure her destruction. Then the next morning, Melampus and Childers chased the corvette Etna as she departed Le Havre. Melampus came within range around 15:30. Etna resisted for two hours before striking her colours as Childers joined the battle. Etna was armed with eighteen 12-pounder guns and had a crew of 137 men under the command of Citizen Joseph La Coudrais. The prisoners stated that both corvettes were carrying military and naval stores and that the corvette that had run ashore was the Etonnant. (Note: As no French naval vessel of the time bore the name, the ship is question is probably Etna's sister-ship, Étonnante, of eighteen 18-pounder guns.) Both were new ships on their first cruise. The Royal Navy took Etna into service as the 20-gun post ship HMS Cormorant. In February 1797 the government made an advance prize money payment of £8000 to the officers and crews of Melampus and Childers.

Commander James O'Brien (or O'Bryen) was appointed captain of Childers on 5 December, and took command in January 1797. On 11 May Childers, in company with Phoebe, Cleopatra, Indefatigable and the hired armed lugger Duke of York, captured the Nouvelle Eugénie. She was a razee privateer of 16 guns and carried a crew of 120 men. She was four days out of Nantes on a 30-day cruise, but had taken no prizes.

Leviathan, Pompee, Anson, Melpomene, and Childers shared in the proceeds of the capture on 10 September 1797 of Tordenskiold. (Note: For Childers, the prize money for a petty officer was 14s 1d; for an able seaman it was 2s 8d.)

Childers brought into Portsmouth on 28 October the French privateer schooner Furet, pierced for 14 guns but carrying only four 4-pounders, and having a crew of 50 men. Childers had been in company with the frigate Triton when they captured the remarkably fast sailing Furet four days earlier as she was sailing between Île de Batz and Alreverak her way back to Tregnier. The privateer had been out three weeks and had made only one capture before herself falling prey to the British.

Then on 11 January 1798, Childers was in company with Indefatigable and Cambrian when they captured the French privateer schooner Vengeur, of 12 guns and 72 men. She was quite new and only eight days out of Ostend without having made any captures. Sir Edward Pellew, of Indefatigable, sent her into Falmouth.

Between 15 October 1797 and 27 May 1798, Childers captured another privateer, a merchant vessel, and recaptured two merchant vessels as well. The privateer was Tartare, and the merchant vessel was Twee Gysberts. The recaptured ships were Racehorse and Helen. (Note: For Childers, the prize money for Twee Gysberts for a petty officer was 16s 11½d; for an able seaman it was 4s 5d. There was also some money for "returned duties" of 3s and 9d, for the two classes, respectively.)

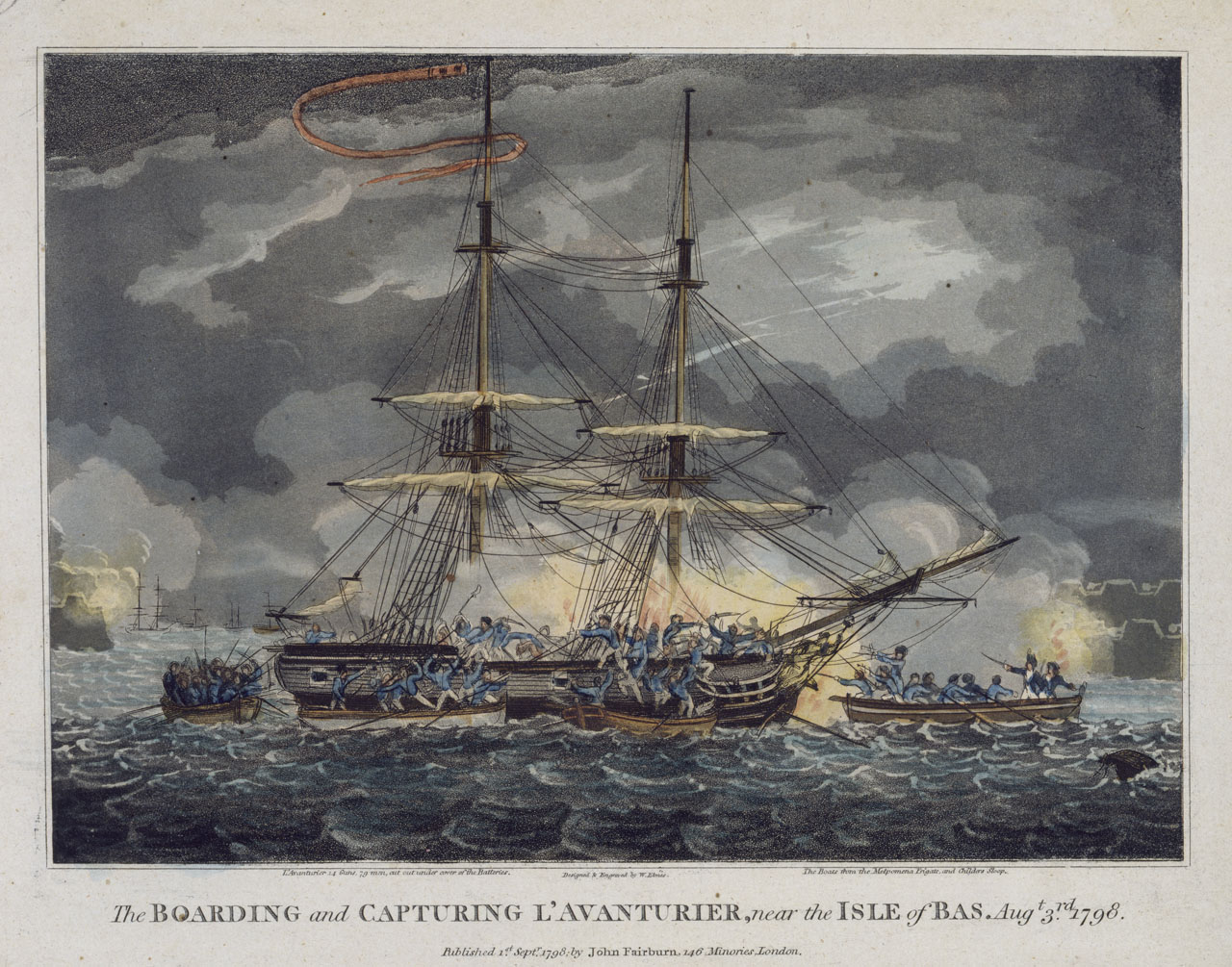
Boats from Melpomene and Childers cutting out Aventurier; National Maritime Museum

On 4 August Aventurier was under the command of Lieutenant René-Guillaume Raffi (or Raffy) and anchored in the port of Corréjou or Corigiou. Here the boats of Melpomene and Childers cut her out. British casualties were one man killed, one missing and four wounded. The French casualties were 16 wounded, several mortally. The attack took place at night and in bad weather. To get Aventurier out of the port took two hours because of the weather conditions and took place under fire from the forts that protected the port. All-in-all, the operation was a daring and arduous one. The subsequent court martial of Lieutenant Raffi, who had been wounded at the start of the attack on his vessel, acquitted him for the loss. She was brought into British service as HMS Aventurier.

In March 1799 Commander James Coutts Crawford assumed command of Childers. On 4 May Childers and the frigate Success arrived at the Bay of Cadiz and notified Vice-Admiral Lord Keith, commander of the British fleet there, that the French fleet had sailed from Brest and that the Spanish fleet had sailed from Ferrol. The next day the French fleet arrived off Cadiz and Keith sailed to meet them. However no engagement developed and Keith sailed into Gibraltar on 9 May. In the meantime, Childers had arrived at Gibraltar on the 4th. Lord St Vincent gathered his forces with a view to pursuing the French, who had traversed the Straits of Gibraltar on the 5th.

Childers returned to Plymouth. On 8 October she escorted "Lascelles "East India store ship" from Plymouth to The Downs.

Agamemnon came into Falmouth on 25 March 1800. She had struck a rock in the Penmarks and had taken on a great deal of water. On her way to port she had encountered Childers, which assisted Agamemnon and accompanied her into port. The Lady Nelson came into Plymouth the next day with a cargo of fruit. A French privateer had captured her, but Childers had recaptured her.

On 26 April, Diamond and Childers captured the French brig St Charles. Five days later, Childers and Eurydice were in sight when the gun-vessel Assault recaptured the brig Adventure, of London, while . That same day they also recaptured Amy.

On 24 October, Childers captured the Spanish privateer lugger Diligenté. Diligenté was armed with two 4-pounder guns and four swivel guns, and had a crew of 30 men. She was three days out of Vigo and had taken no prizes.

Childers came into Portsmouth in February 1801. She had left Lisbon three weeks earlier, escorting 12 merchant vessels and transports. As she went into Portsmouth the convoy sailed on to the Downs.

Seven plus months later, on 11 September, Childers captured the French brig Sally. Childers shared the proceeds with Achille and Terrible.

On 9 March 1802, Childers was driven ashore at the Warren, Isle of Wight and heeled over onto her side. HMS Wolverine (1798) was sent to her assistance. Crawford received promotion to post-captain on 29 April. Commander John Delafons replaced Crawford briefly as he took command in July, and she was paid off in November.

When Earl St Vincent and the Lords Commissioners of the Admiralty in the Commissioners' yacht visited Plymouth on an inspection tour on 27 August, Rosario and Childers fired a salute. The two vessels then moved to Cawsand Bay to remain there for the duration of the visit. They were still there on 5 September.

== Napoleonic Wars ==
Commander (or Lt.) Sir William Bolton commissioned Childers in August 1803 for the Mediterranean. (Note: In May 1803, before assuming command of Childers, Bolton acted as proxy for Admiral Nelson at Nelson's investiture as a Knight of the Order of the Bath. (Nelson was in the Mediterranean.) Bolton received a knighthood at the same occasion.) On 4 September Childers came into Plymouth from the Hamoaze where she had been refitting. Then on 7 September Childers sailed from Plymouth to join a convoy that was assembling at Portsmouth for the Mediterranean. On 22 September, 1803 she was damaged in a storm between Gibraltar and the Barbary shore losing her top mast, she requested assistance of, and received aide by, USS Constitution, who towed her for 5-6 leagues before casting her off to proceed to Gibraltar.

Victory, Renown, Seahorse and Childers shared in the proceeds of the capture on 14 January 1804 of the St. Gieuseppe e L'Allanza. On 24 August Phoebe and Childers captured the Venscab.

In August 1805, Commander John Lake took command of Childers. In an enclosure to a letter dated 7 October 1805, Admiral Lord Nelson wrote, "Jalouse, Childers, and Merlin being unfit for the service of this Country, are ordered home with the first Convoy to be repaired".

Still, on 24 December, while serving in the squadron under Vice-Admiral Lord Collingwood, she detained the Ragusan ship Terpsichore, of 280 tons (bm), which was carrying a cargo of sugar, coffee, and the like from Isle de France (Mauritius), to Leghorn.

Lake's replacement in March 1806 was Commander Thomas Innes. Innes and Childers captured the Danish vessels Johanna Seegmond and Else Christiana on 26 October 1807.

On 8 April 1805, during his captivity in France, William Henry Dillon had been promoted to commander, and on obtaining his release in September 1807 he took the command of Childers in early 1808.

In January Childers lay in Leith roads, waiting to escort vessels trading with Gothenburg. The local merchants, however, rejected her protection, put off by her small size and weak armament, which they felt would not enable her to protect them from the privateers in the North Sea. Childers therefore sailed for the Baltic alone, to do what she could to annoy the enemies.

In her, late in the afternoon of 14 March 1808, Dillon was sailing towards the south-west the coast of Norway when he sighted a sail. He set out in pursuit and chased the vessel into the small port of Midbe (possibly Midtre Kalvekilen). The local inhabitants sent out boats to retrieve the quarry's cargo, but these dispersed when Childers's boats arrived to cut her out. The party from Childers retrieved the galiot together with her cargo of oil and fish, and despite small arms fire from the shore and rocks heaved down on them from a precipice above where her crew had abandoned the galiot. As the cutting out party returned with the galiot, Dillon observed a large brig sailing out from Hitteroe (probably Flekkefjord), towards Childers, with the apparent intent of recapturing the prize.

An engagement of some three hours duration developed as the Danish brig hugged the coast. The vessels exchanged broadsides and at one point the Danish brig caught fire forward. Dillon eventually was able to lure the brig out to about three miles off shore. At about 11pm Childers was able to fire a broadside at close range, after which the Dane broke off the engagement and headed back towards Norway. The brig's cannon fire had holed Childers and she had five feet of water in her hold. The crew manned the pumps but Dillon was afraid that she might sink and was not in a position to pursue. He therefore returned to Leith, together with the galiot. (She was probably the Christina.)

The Danish vessel was the brig Lougen, of eighteen 18-pounder guns and two 6-pounder stern chasers. Childers, by contrast, had sixteen 12-pounder carronades and two 6-pounder bow chasers. Her crew numbered only about 65 men and boys (including some nine or so on the prize), well short of her establishment of 84; Lougen had a crew of 160.

Childers lost two men killed and nine wounded, among them Dillon, who was severely wounded in both legs. Dillon received promotion to post captain, with date 21 March 1808, and the Lloyd's Patriotic Fund presented him a sword valued at one hundred guineas in acknowledgement of his gallant conduct. (Note: Marshall speculates that Dillon engaged the larger and more powerful Danish brig to prevent her from attacking the convoy from Scotland that he expected and that came into sight the next day.) In 1847 the Admiralty awarded the Naval General Service Medal with clasp "Childers 14 March 1808" to the four surviving claimants from the action.

Commander Joseph Packwood replaced the wounded Dillon on Childers, which remained based on the Leith station. On the morning of 19 October, Childers was 15 leagues off Kinnaird Head when she sighted two sails. She gave chase and after about an hour and a half recaptured the sloop Lord Nelson, in ballast, which a privateer, the second sail that had been sighted, had captured a little earlier that morning. Packwood then set out after the privateer, which she captured in about another hour and a half. The privateer was the Danish sloop Frernskernstern. Frernskernstern was armed with four 4-pounder guns and two swivels, and had a crew of 22 men. She had left her home port of Stavanger on the 15th and had been off the Scottish coast for two days but Lord Nelson was her only capture.

On 7 November Clio, in company with Childers, captured Danish schooner No. 32. Then on 16 August 1809 she was in company with HMS Nightingale (1805) at the capture of the Danish vessel Transport No 52.

Childers recaptured Anna on 8 April 1809. Eleven days later, Childers and Nymphen captured the Danish galliot Emannuel.

On 5 July Childers captured Hoop and Nordscandia. Towards the end of the month, on 30 July, Childers captured the Danish galliot Amelia. Nine days later, on 8 August, Childers, captured the Danish privateer Den For Agetede Hensight. Then, Childers captured Flundrun and Aurora on 10 and 11 November. The next day Childers was in sight when Nid Elven (or Ned Elven) captured Susanna Catharina. Childers also shared by agreement in Nid Elven's capture of Wohlfarth, and Hans Barend on 19 November.

During 1809, Commander Francis Nott commanded Childers temporarily.

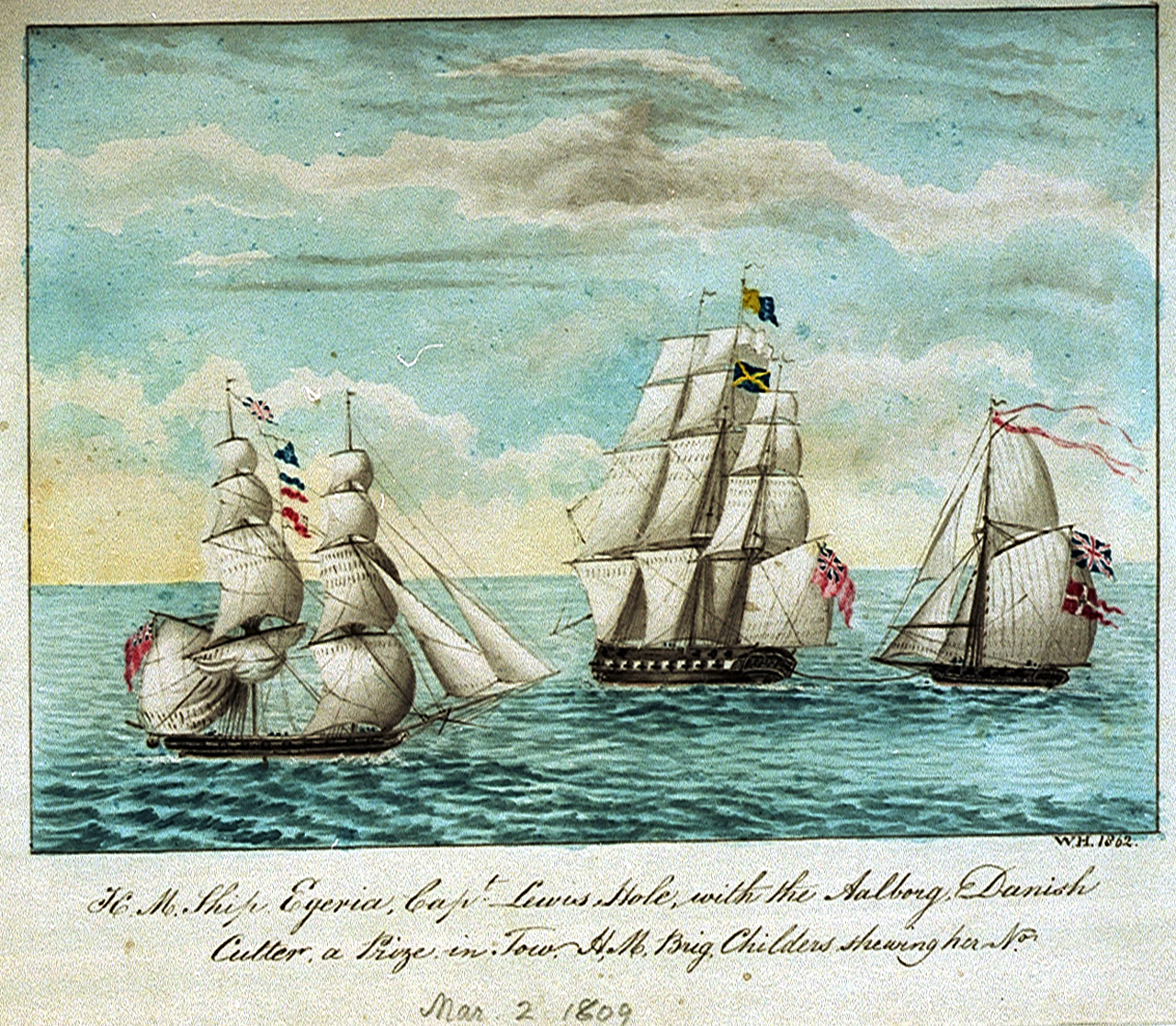
HM Ship Egeria, Capt Lewis Hole, with the Aalborg, Danish Cutter, a prize, in Tow, HM Brig Childers shewing her Nos March 2, 1809

One 1 April 1810, Childers captured the Prussian galliot Anna Maria. She then captured the fishing doggers Zeemeuw, Mercure, Johanna, Christine, and Pappenburg on 15 July. Lastly, Childers captured Neptunus on 31 October.

Between December 1810 and January 1811, the officers and crew of Childers presented the master, George Wilson, an inscribed sword. Wilson had jumped into the sea at the risk of his own life to rescue a seaman who had fallen from the fore-yard-arm and was sinking.

== Fate ==
Childers was finally paid off from service in January 1811 and broken up in the following month. Packwood was promoted to post captain on 14 February 1811.
