= French ship America (1788) =

Ship of the line of the French Navy

- Scale model of Achille, sister ship of French ship America (1788), on display at the Musée national de la Marine in Paris.

History

France
- Name: America
- Namesake: USS America (1782)
- Builder: Brest
- Laid down: 1787
- Launched: 21 May 1788
- Commissioned: 1789
- Captured: 1 June 1794

Great Britain
- Name: Impétueux
- Acquired: 1 June 1794
- Honours and awards: Naval General Service Medal with clasp: "29 July Boat Service 1800"; "29 Aug. Boat Service 1800"
- Fate: Broken up in 1813

General characteristics
- Class & type: Téméraire-class ship of the line
- Displacement: 3,069 tonneaux
- Tons burthen: 1,537 port tonneaux
- Length: 55.87 metres (183.3 ft) (172 pied)
- Beam: 14.90 metres (48 ft 11 in)
- Draught: 7.26 metres (23.8 ft) (22 pied)
- Propulsion: Up to 2,485 m^{2} (26,750 sq ft) of sails
- Armament: 74 guns: Lower gundeck: 28 × 36-pounder long guns; Upper gundeck: 30 × 18-pounder long guns; Forecastle and Quarter deck: 16 × 8-pounder long guns; 4 × 36-pounder carronades
- Armour: Timber

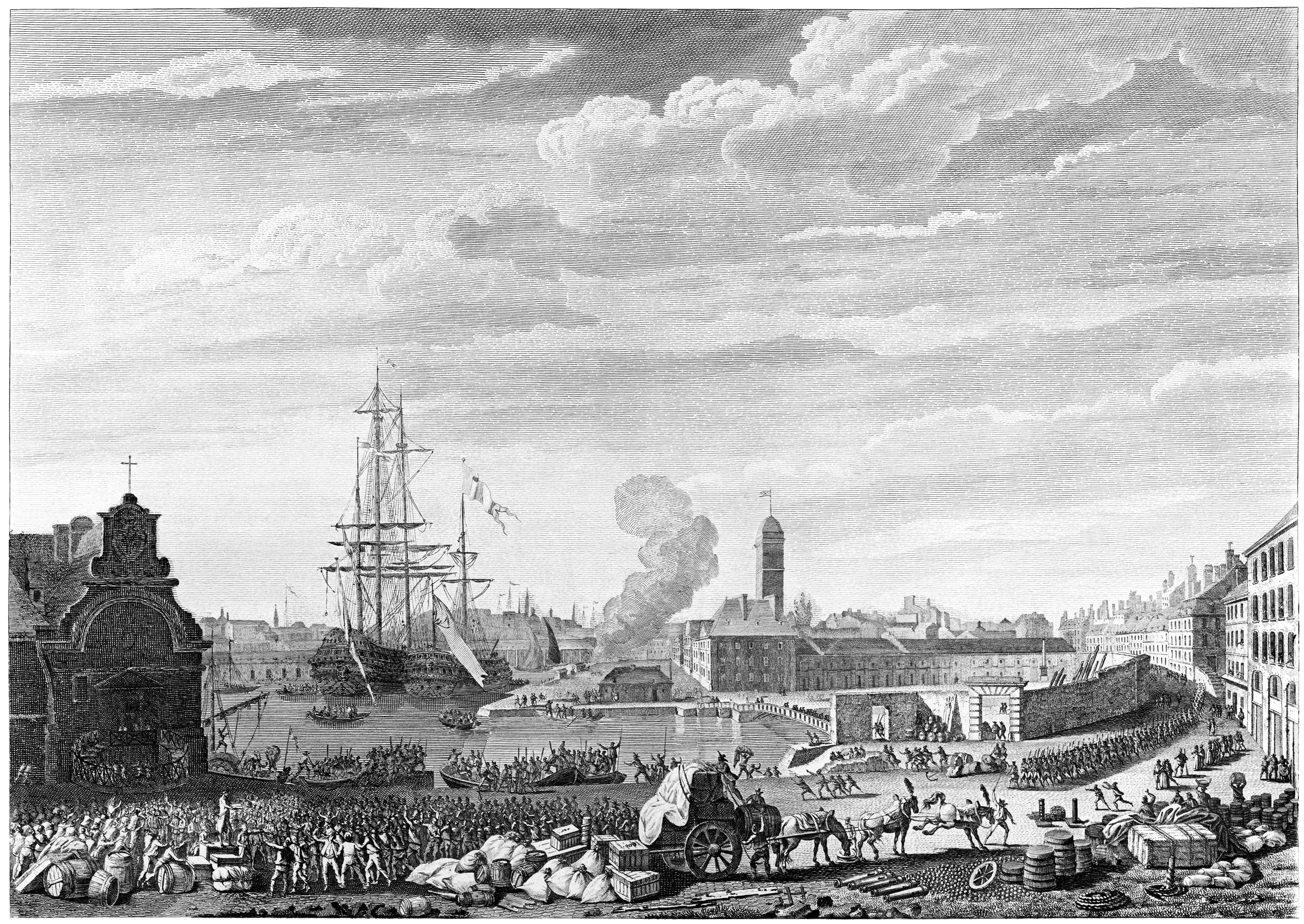
The French Revolution in Brest in September 1790 and the insurrection of the ships of the line, America and Leopard

America was a Téméraire-class 74-gun ship of the line of the French Navy. The Royal Navy captured her in 1794 at the Glorious First of June. She then served with the British under the name HMS Impetueux until she was broken up in 1813. She became the prototype for the Royal Navy America-class ship of the line.

== Capture ==
The vessel was captured by HMS Leviathan at the Battle of the Glorious First of June. In 1795 the Admiralty renamed her HMS Impétueux as there was already a ship named America in the British navy.

== British service ==
On 5 October 1796, Captain John Willet Payne was given command. After a refit at Portsmouth, she sailed for Spithead on 11 October, where her refit continued until she sailed on English Channel duty on 28 October, returning to Spithead on 1 January 1797. In that year Payne resigned his commission through ill-health and Captain Sampson Edwards assumed command.

On 8 March 1797, Impetueux captured Vautour, a privateer cutter from an unknown harbour, commissioned in early 1797.

Captain Sir Edward Pellew assumed command on 1 March 1799.

In March 1799, while under Pellew's command, some of the crew of Impetueux fomented a mutiny. The Marine Guard remained loyal, which enabled Pellew to suppress the mutiny. Three were hanged and six were flogged around the fleet before being transferred to other ships.

On 4 June 1800, a squadron under Captain Edward Pellew in Impetueux, the 32-gun frigate Thames, Captain William Lukin, the 16-gun ship sloop Cynthia and some small-craft, attacked the south-west end of Quiberon and silenced the forts. Troops under Major Ramsey then landed and destroyed the forts. The attack resulted in the British taking several vessels and scuttling others. The only casualties were in Cynthia, which lost two men killed and one wounded.

On 29 July a boat each from Impetueux, Amethyst, and Viper, under the command of Lieutenant Jeremiah Coghlan of Viper brought out the brig Cerbère from Port-Louis, Morbihan. In 1847 the Admiralty awarded the Naval General Service Medal with clasp, "29 July Boat Service 1800" to the four surviving claimants from the action.

On 25 August a squadron and convoy under the command of Rear-Admiral Sir John Borlase Warren participated in another attack on a fort at the bay of Playa de Dominos (Doniños), outside the port of Ferrol. Impétueux, the 28-gun frigate Brilliant, Cynthia and the 14-gun hired armed cutter St Vincent silenced the battery, which was armed with eight 24-pounders. Then seamen from the ships landed to assist a large force of army troops to haul the guns up to the heights above Ferrol. However, it became apparent that Ferrol was too well fortified. The Navy then re-embarked the troops and the whole British force withdrew.

Four days later, the same squadron sent a cutting out party consisting of two boats each from Amethyst, Stag, Amelia, Brilliant and Cynthia, four boats from Courageaux, as well as the boats from Renown, London and Impetueux into Vigo bay where the French privateer Guipe, of Bordeaux, had taken refuge. After a 15-minute fight the British captured the privateer and towed her out. She was flush-decked and displaced 300 tons. She was pierced for 22 guns but carried 18 9-pounders, and had a crew of 161 men under the command of Citoyenne Dupan. The expedition cost the British four dead, 23 officers and men wounded, and one man missing. The French lost 25 dead and 40 wounded. In 1847 the Admiralty issued the Naval General Service Medal with clasp "29 Aug. Boat Service 1800" to all survivors of this action that came forward to claim it.

== Fate ==
Impétueux was broken up in 1813.

== See also ==
- French ship Impétueux (1787)
- List of ships captured in the 18th century
- List of ships of the line of France
