= French corvette Étonnante =

History

France
- Name: Étonnante
- Namesake: "Surprising"
- Builder: Fouache & Reine, Honfleur
- Launched: 27 August 1795
- In service: November 1796
- Fate: Hulked in Brest in 1806

General characteristics
- Type: Corvette
- Displacement: 640-719 tons (French)
- Length: 35.95 m (117.9 ft) (overall); 32.48 m (106.6 ft) (keel)
- Beam: 9.74 m (32.0 ft)
- Draught: 4.68 m (15.4 ft) (unladen)
- Depth of hold: 4.82 m (15.8 ft)
- Propulsion: Sail
- Armament: Design: 14 × 24-pounder guns; 1797-1803: 16 × 18-pounder long guns

Étonnante was an 18-gun Etna-class corvette of the French Navy, launched in 1795. She was struck from the navy in 1804 and hulked in 1806.

== Career ==
In the night of 13 to 14 November 1796, Étonnante departed Le Havre with her sister-ship Etna, and was chased by HMS Melampus and HMS Minerva, which drove her ashore near Barfleur. However the British were not able to get close enough to assure the destruction of Étonnante. Still, they were able to capture Etna. The French were able with difficulty to salvage Étonnante.

Étonnante later served at Saint-Malo in 1797 and at Brest in 1802. She was struck in 1804. She then underwent conversion to a ponton arrière-garde or corps de garde. She disappears from records after 1806.
