= French gun-vessel Eclair =

Eclair
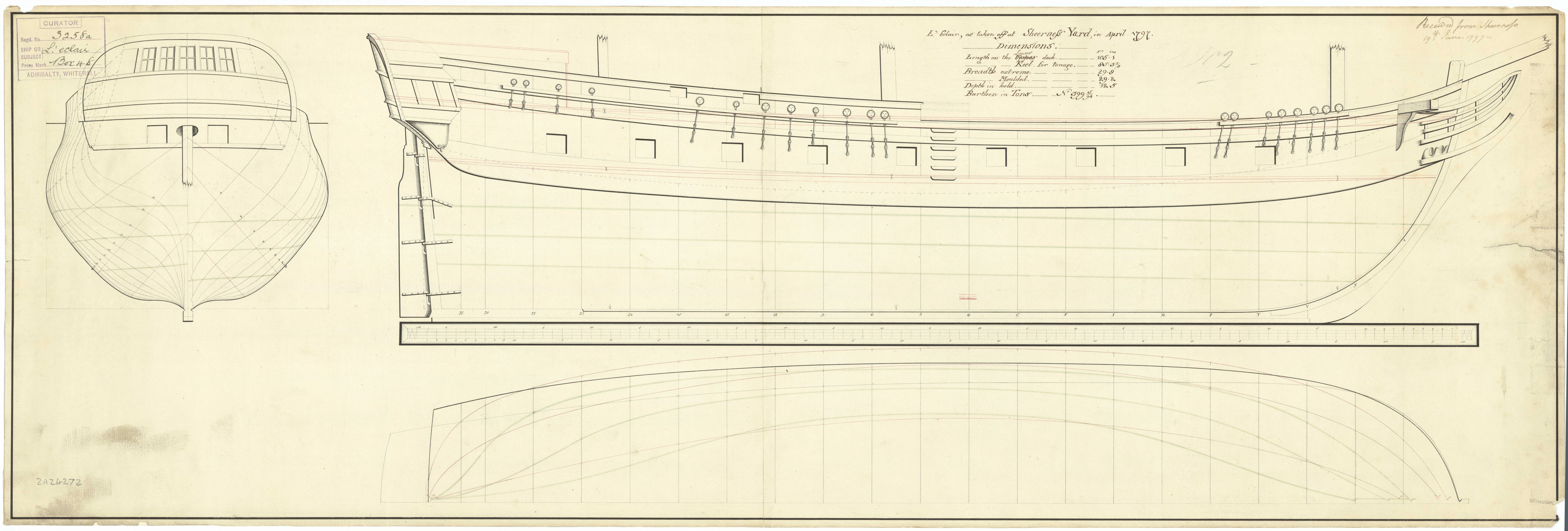
- Eclair, a plan taken off at Sheerness in April 1797

History

France
- Name: Chasse maree No.?
- Launched: 1785
- Renamed: Eclair in 1793
- Captured: May 1795

Great Britain
- Name: Eclair
- Acquired: May 1795 by capture
- Commissioned: July 1795
- Renamed: HMS Safety in 1802
- Fate: Broken up 1879

General characteristics
- Displacement: 150 tons (French)
- Tons burthen: 107 (bm)
- Length: 59 ft 3 in (18.1 m) (overall); 45 ft 11 in (14.0 m) (keel)
- Beam: 20 ft 4 in (6.2 m)
- Depth of hold: 6 ft 11 in (2.1 m)
- Complement: 35-53 (French service)
- Armament: 3 × 18-pounder guns (French service)

The French gun-vessel Eclair was one of 20 chasse-marées built in 1785 in southern Brittany for use as service craft in harbour construction at Cherbourg. In 1793 Martin or Jacques Fabien converted ten of them into chaloupes-canonnières (gun-vessels). One of these received the name Eclair. Sir Richard Strachan's squadron captured her in 1795 in Cartaret Bay, and the Royal Navy took her into service as HMS Eclair. She then sailed to the West Indies where she was probably out of service by 1801. In 1802 she was hulked under the name HMS Safety. She then served as a prison ship at Jamaica around 1808 to 1810. She may have been sold at Tortola in 1817/18, but in 1841 or so was brought back into service there as a receiving hulk. She was broken up in 1879.

== French service ==
Between September and November 1793, the chasse maree that became Eclair was converted to a lugger and armed with three 18-pounder guns.

Between 11 October 1794 and 30 December 1794, Eclair was under the command of enseigne de vaisseau non entretenu Bonnaire. She escorted a convoy from Barfleur back to her station at Cherbourg roads.

Then between 30 January 1795 and 29 April she was in the Cherbourg roads under the command of enseigne de vaisseau non entretenu Duport.

== Capture ==
On 9 May 1795 Strachan, in Melampus, was in command of a squadron that attacked and destroyed a French convoy in Cartaret Bay. The British squadron spotted a convoy of 13 vessels and immediately gave chase. Twelve of the quarry escaped and got close to the shore where a small shore battery, their own armed escorts, and a brig and a lugger offered some protection. Strachan sent in the boats from the vessels in his squadron while Melampus and the ships provided covering fire. The French crews abandoned their vessels at the approach of the British and eventually the shore battery also stopped firing. The cutting out party retrieved all the vessels, save a small sloop, which was hard ashore and which they burnt. Melampus had eight men wounded and in all the British lost one man killed and 14 wounded. They captured a gun brig and a gun lugger, each armed with three 18-pounder guns. They also captured the convoy, which consisted of: Prosperitte (80 tons and carrying cordage), Montagne (200 tons and carrying timber, lead and tin plates), Catharine (200 tons and carrying ship timber), Hyrondelle (220 tons and carrying ship timber and pitch), Contente (250 tons carrying powder), Nymphe (120 tons and carrying fire wood), Bonne-Union (150 tons), Fantazie (45 tons and carrying coals), Alexandre (397 tons and carrying ship timber, cordage, hemp and cannon), and Petit Neptune (113 tons and carrying ship timber). A later prize money report added the names of two more vessels, Crachefeu and Eclair. Crachefeu was the gun-brig and Eclair the gun-lugger; the Royal Navy took both into service.

== British service ==
The Royal Navy commissioned Eclair in July 1795 under the command of Lieutenant Joseth [sic] Withers. He then sailed her for the Leeward Islands on 12 April 1796. Eclair was converted to a schooner in 1796, presumably before she sailed. Eclair sailed for the Leeward Islands on the same day as Crachefeu, and so possibly in company with her.

Eclair was probably paid-off and laid up before 1801. On 17 January 1801 the British captured the French schooner Eclair at Trois-Rivières, in the French Antilles. The Royal Navy commissioned this Eclair as HMS Eclair, and throughout her subsequent career referred to her as His Majesty's schooner Eclair. Although there were a few cases where two vessels in the same theatre might share a name, generally as soon as the Admiralty became aware of the name conflict it would rename one of the vessels to remove ambiguity. That there were two Eclair schooners on active duty in the West Indies at the same time is highly improbable.

In 1802 the Eclair of 1795 returned to service as the hulk HMS Safety. Safety was listed as a guardship in the West Indies in 1808 and as prison ship in 1810. However, Lieutenant Joseph Williams was appointed to command "the Safety prison ship, at Jamaica" in 1808. Furthermore, Lloyd's List reported that on 7 April 1808 HMS Safety had sent Tortola, Fotheringham, master, into Tortola.

Safety was at Tortola in 1817, and the Navy may have disposed of her there in 1817/18. However, Safety then reappeared as a receiving hulk at Tortola in 1841. The Navy List of 1862 listed her as "Safety, Schooner. Receiving Hulk. Tortola." She was finally broken up in 1879.
