= French gun-brig Crachefeu =

French and then British gun-brig (1793–1797)

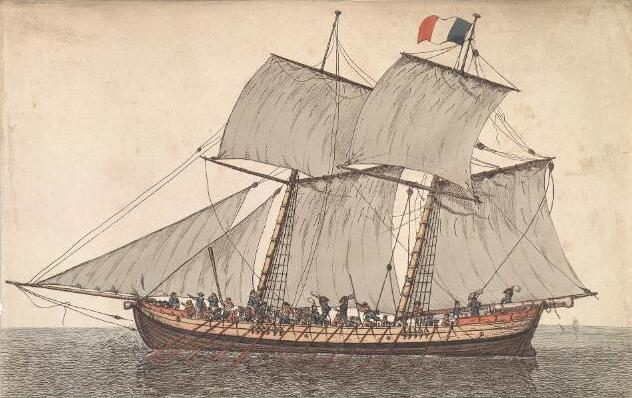
- French gun boat La Crache Feu ('Fire Spitter'), drawn by Robert Dighton

History

France
- Name: Crachefeu
- Builder: Cherbourg Dockyard
- Laid down: October 1793
- Launched: February 1794
- Captured: May 1795

Great Britain
- Name: Crachefeu or Crache Feu
- Acquired: May 1795 by capture
- Commissioned: July 1795
- Fate: Broken up 1797, or ca. 1802

General characteristics
- Displacement: 150 tons (French)
- Tons burthen: 14360/94 (bm)
- Length: 79 ft 7 in (24.3 m) (overall); 68 ft 4 3/8 in (20.8 m) (keel)
- Beam: 19 ft 10 1/2 in (6.1 m)
- Depth of hold: 6 ft 3 in (1.9 m)
- Complement: 56 (French service)
- Armament: 3 × 18-pounder guns (French & British service)

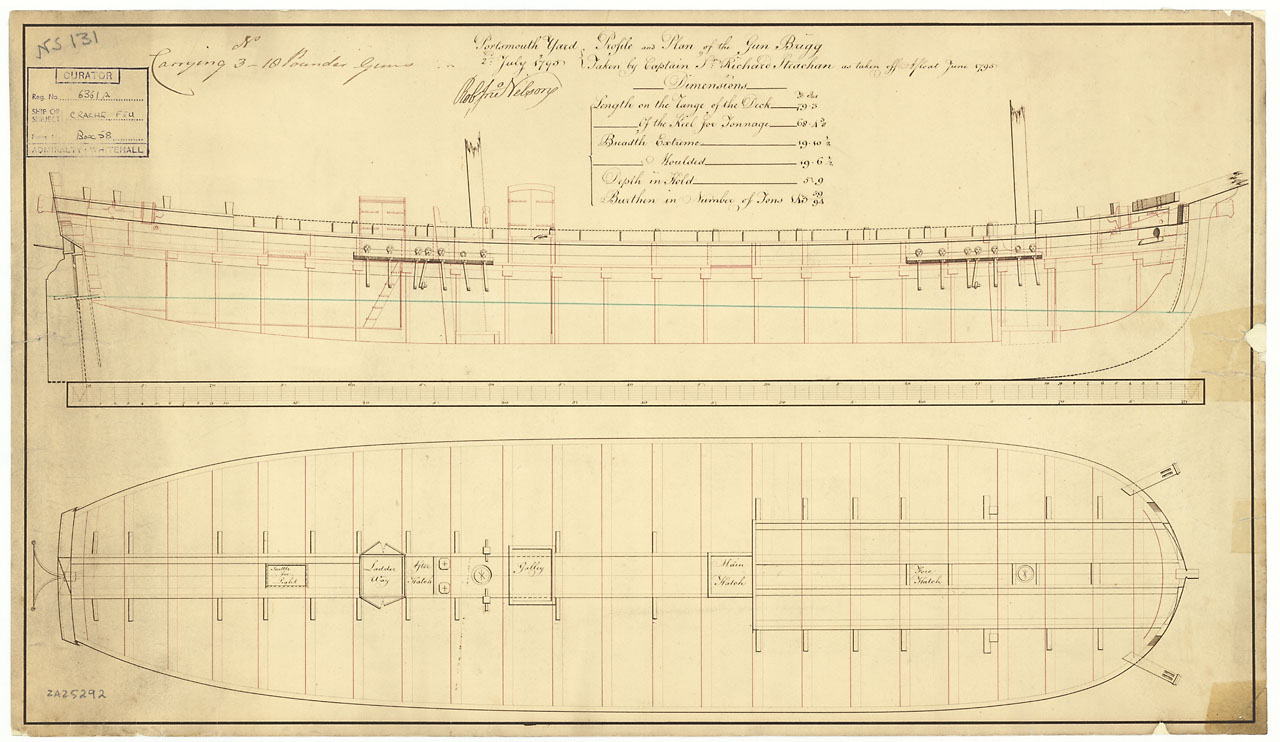
Scale: 1:48 Plan, showing the body plan, sheer lines with inboard details, and longitudinal half-breadth for Crache Feu, by Edward Tippet [Master Shipwright, Portsmouth Dockyard, 1793-1799], National Maritime Museum, Greenwich

Crachefeu was a French Navy gun brig launched in 1793. Sir Richard Strachan's squadron captured her in 1795 in Cartaret Bay, and the Royal Navy took her into service as HMS Crachefeu. She then sailed to the West Indies where she broken up in 1797, or possibly around 1802.

== French Navy ==
From 22 March 1794 to 8 December, Crachefeu was under the command of enseigne de vaisseau non entretenu Menage. She escorted convoys between Cherbourg and Saint-Malo, and cruised in the vicinity of the island of Jersey and off the coast of the Cotentin Peninsula).

Then from 30 December to 29 April 1795, still under Menage's command, she escorted a convoy from Granville to Carteret, cruised in the vicinity of Chausey, and took up station at Regnéville-sur-Mer.

== Capture ==
=== British account ===
On 9 May 1795 Strachan, in Melampus, was in command of a squadron that attacked and destroyed a French convoy in Cartaret Bay. The British squadron spotted a convoy of 13 vessels and immediately gave chase. Twelve of the quarry escaped and got close to the shore where a small shore battery, their own armed escorts, and a brig and a lugger offered some protection. Strachan sent in the boats from the vessels in his squadron while Melampus and the ships provided covering fire. The French crews abandoned their vessels at the approach of the British and eventually the shore battery also stopped firing. The cutting out party retrieved all the vessels, save a small sloop, which was hard ashore and which they burnt. Melampus had eight men wounded and in all the British lost one man killed and 14 wounded. They captured a gun brig and a gun lugger, each armed with three 18-pounder guns. They also captured the convoy, which consisted of: Prosperitte (80 tons and carrying cordage), Montagne (200 tons and carrying timber, lead and tin plates), Catharine (200 tons and carrying ship timber), Hyrondelle (220 tons and carrying ship timber and pitch), Contente (250 tons, carrying powder), Nymphe (120 tons carrying fire wood), Bonne-Union (150 tons), Fantazie (45 tons carrying coals), Alexandre (397 and carrying ship timber, cordage, hemp and cannon), and Petit Neptune (113 tons and carrying ship timber). A later prize money report add the names of two more vessels, Crachefeu and Eclair. Crachefeu was the gun-brig and Eclair the gun-lugger, and the Royal Navy took both into service.

=== French account ===
The convoy left for Cherbourg at 9:15pm, and at 3:30 sighted five English vessels. The convoy tried to reach Carteret, but was forced to take shelter at Surtainville, where there was a fort. The convoy reached the fort by 7:15. There her crew attempted to scuttle Crachefeu, but were only able to run her ashore. All the crew got ashore safely around 9:30, including her officers and her commander, Ménage. They continued to resist from shore with small arms fire, but the British were able to retrieve all the vessels. Two Frenchmen, one a customs official and one a farmer, were killed assisting the guns of the fort, which amounted to three 24-pounders, one of which was dismounted during the action.

== Royal Navy ==
The Navy commissioned Crachefeu (or Crache feu) in July 1795 under the command of Lieutenant Lewis Mortlock, who moved from Badger. On 17 December Crachefeu came into Milford. She had carried away her rudder head and to get back into port the crew had to tie one of her sweeps to the after part of her rudder and use tackles to move it.

On 12 April 1796 he sailed her to the Leeward Islands. Crachefeu sailed for the Leeward Islands on the same day as Eclair, and so possibly in company with her.

== Fate ==
Some sources state that Crachefeu was broken up in 1797. On 16 April 1798, the newly promoted Commander Lewis Mortlock assumed command of Wolverine; he was killed in action on Wolverine on 3 January 1799.

Crachefeu may not have been broken up in 1797, however. Admiralty records hold a letter dated 4 February 1802 that states that "The Crachefeu, formally a gun vessel which was used for many years about moorings and anchors in Martinique, has been frequently sunk and is riddled with worms. Rear Admiral Sir John Duckworth has given orders that she be destroyed."
