= HMS Cynthia (1796) =

Sloop of the Royal Navy

History

Great Britain
- Name: HMS Cynthia
- Ordered: 16 September 1795
- Builder: Wells & Co., Rotherhithe, London
- Laid down: October 1795
- Launched: 23 February 1796
- Commissioned: March 1796
- Honors and awards: Naval General Service Medal with clasps: "29 Aug. Boat Service 1800"; "Egypt"
- Fate: Broken up in October 1809

General characteristics
- Class & type: 16-gun sliding-keel sloop-of-war
- Tons burthen: 40765/94 (bm)
- Length: 113 ft (34.4 m) (gundeck); 94 ft 4 3/8 in (28.8 m) (keel)
- Beam: 28 ft 6 in (8.7 m)
- Depth of hold: 12 ft (3.7 m)
- Sail plan: Full-rigged ship
- Complement: 121
- Armament: 16 × 6-pounder guns + 14 × 1/2-pounder swivel guns

HMS Cynthia was a ship sloop of unusual design which launched in 1796. She took part in one medal-worthy boat action and participated in captures of a number of merchant vessels. She was present at two notable occasions, the surrender of the Dutch fleet in the Vlieter Incident and the capture of Alexandria, and her crew participated in two land attacks on forts. She was broken up in 1809.

== Design ==
Wells & Co. of Rotherhithe built Cynthia with a shallow draught and three daggerboards (John Schank's sliding keels) for stability. She was rated for 18 guns, but during construction her rating was reduced to sixteen 6-pounder guns. She also carried fourteen half-pounds swivels, although the latter were probably replaced by a much smaller number of carronades during her career.

== Service during the French Revolutionary Wars ==
Cynthia was commissioned in March 1796 under Commander Micajah Malbon. Thirteen months later, Cynthia, in company with Diamond, Minerva, Camilla, and the hired armed cutter Grand Falconer captured the American ship Favourite on 19 April 1797. On 5 October Cynthia was in company with Diamond, Syren and Melampus when they captured the Spanish ship Nostra Senora Del Carmen.

Cynthia, Cormorant and St Fiorenzo recaptured the American vessel Betty. Then on 24 Nov 1797 she was in company with Cormorant and Grand Falconer when they captured the French merchant sloop Necessaire.

On 15 February 1798 Cynthia was in company with Cormorant when they captured the Prussian galiot Welwaert. On 28 August 1799, Cynthia was with the British fleet that captured the Dutch hulks Drotchterland and Brooderschap, and the ships Helder, Venus, Minerva, and Hector, in the New Diep, in Holland. A partial pay-out of prize money resulted in a payment of 6s 8d to each seaman that had been in the fleet that day. The capture of these vessels was part of the Anglo-Russian invasion of Holland and preceded by two days the Vlieter Incident in which a large part of the navy of the Batavian Republic, commanded by Rear-Admiral Samuel Story, surrendered to the British navy on a sandbank near the Channel known as De Vlieter, near Wieringen. Cynthia was also among the vessels sharing in the prize money from the Dutch vessels of the Vlieter Incident.

On 4 June 1800, Cynthia was part of a squadron under Captain Edward Pellew in Impetueux. The 32-gun frigate Thames, Captain William Lukin, Cynthia, and some small-craft, attacked the south-west end of Quiberon and silenced the forts. Troops under Major Ramsey then landed and destroyed the forts. The attack resulted in the British taking several vessels and scuttling others. The only casualties were in Cynthia, which lost two men killed and one wounded.

Because Cynthia was with Pellew's squadron for a time, she benefited from the prize or salvage money for the Vigilant, Menais, Industry, Insolent, Ann and for the wreck of a vessel sold. Vessels of the squadron had made the captures, which they then shared with the remainder. Cynthia also shared in the proceeds from the recapture of the Lancaster on 28 June.

On 25 August Cynthia, now under Commander John Dick, was in a squadron and convoy under the command of Rear-Admiral Sir John Borlase Warren. She participated in another attack on a fort at the bay of Playa de Dominos (Doniños), outside the port of Ferrol, together with the 74-gun Impétueux, the 28-gun frigate Brilliant, and the 14-gun hired armed cutter St Vincent. The vessels silenced the battery, which was armed with eight 24-pounders. Then seamen from the ships landed to assist a large force of army troops to haul the guns up to the heights above Ferrol. However, it became apparent that Ferrol was too well fortified. The Navy then reembarked the troops and the whole British force withdrew.

Four days later, in Vigo Bay, Admiral Sir Samuel Hood assembled a cutting-out party from the vessels under his command consisting of two boats each from Cynthia, Stag, Amelia, Brilliant and Amethyst, four boats from Courageaux, as well as the boats from Renown, London and Impetueux The party went in and after a 15-minute fight captured the French privateer Guêpe, of Bordeaux and towed her out. She was of 300 tons burthen and had a flush deck. Pierced for 20 guns, she carried eighteen 9-pounders, and she and her crew of 161 men were under the command of Citizen Dupan. In the attack she lost 25 men killed, including Dupan, and 40 wounded. British casualties amounted to four killed, 23 wounded and one missing. (Note: A first-class share of the prize money was worth £42 19s 6½d; a fifth-class share, that of a seaman, was worth 1s 9½d.) In 1847 the Admiralty awarded the Naval General Service Medal with clasp "29 Aug. Boat Service 1800" to all surviving claimants from the action.

On 5 December Cynthia and the gunvessel Urchin were in company with the 36-gun frigate Florentina when Florentina captured the French polacre Union, bound from Alexandria to France with a cargo of rice and coffee. Two days later, the same three vessels captured the French brig Bon Pasteur Retrouve on the same route with rice, coffee and sugar. Six days after that, the same three vessels captured the French brig Heureuse Clairon and her cargo of rice and coffee.

On 19 February 1801, Cynthia and Florentina were among the vessels sharing in the capture of the Rosa. On 9 June Cynthia was among the vessels participating in the capture of the Felicite and Josephine, off Alexandria. Then on 28 July she shared in the capture of the Almas di Purgatoria, also off Alexandria.

In August 1801, Cynthia participated in the Egyptian operations. In the morning of 17 August, after the Battle of Alexandria and the subsequent siege, Captain Alexander Cochrane in the 74-gun Ajax, with the sixth-rate Bonne Citoyenne, Cynthia, the brig-sloops Port Mahon and Victorieuse, and three Turkish corvettes, were the first vessels to enter the harbour. Because Cynthia served in the navy's Egyptian campaign between 8 March 1801 and 2 September, her officers and crew qualified for the clasp "Egypt" to the Naval General Service Medal that the Admiralty authorised in 1850 for all surviving claimants. (Note: A first-class share of the prize money awarded in April 1823 was worth £34 2s 4d; a fifth-class share was worth 3s 11½d. The amount was small as the total had to be shared between 79 vessels and the entire army contingent.)

In 1801 or 1802, Lord Elgin requested that Cynthia help transport some cases of the so-called Elgin Marbles, but her captain, Commander Wright, declined. One of Cynthia's last tasks was to transport ten Army mutineers from Gibraltar on 12 January 1803 to Portsmouth, where seven were transferred to Calcutta on 21 April for transport to Australia.

== Fate ==
In February 1803 Cynthia was laid up in ordinary at Chatham. She broken up in 1809.
