= French corvette Etna (1795) =

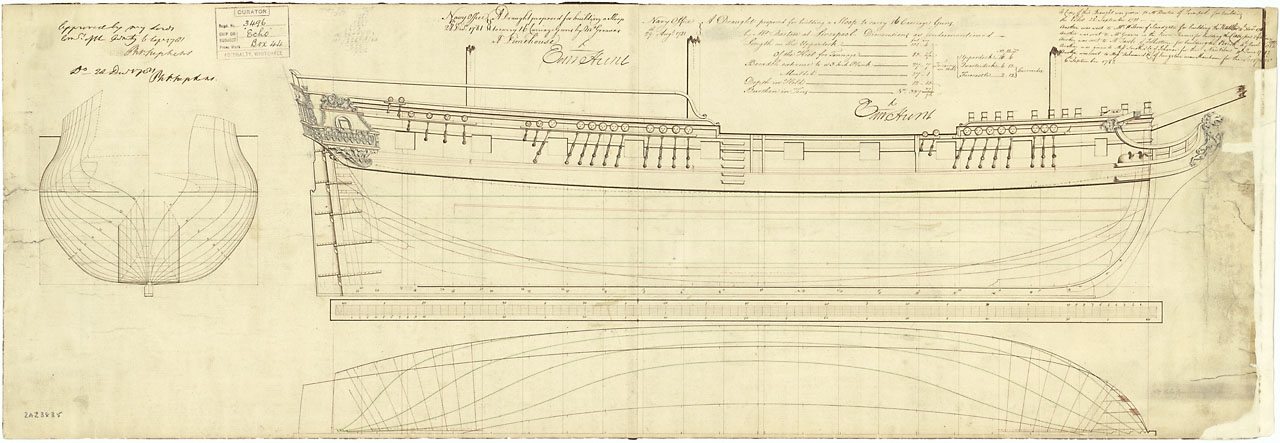
- Royal Navy plan of Etna as taken off in 1796, prior to being fitted as a 20-gun sixth-rate post-ship

History

France
- Name: Etna
- Builder: André-François and Joseph-Augustin Normand, Honfleur
- Laid down: June 1794
- Launched: April 1795
- Captured: November 1796

Great Britain
- Name: HMS Aetna
- Acquired: November 1796 by capture
- Commissioned: May 1797
- Renamed: HMS Cormorant in 1797
- Fate: Wrecked 15 May 1800

General characteristics
- Tons burthen: 564 40/94 (bm)
- Length: 119 ft 4 in (36.4 m) (overall); 98 ft 2 1/2 in (29.9 m) (keel)
- Beam: 32 ft 10 1/2 in (10.0 m)
- Depth of hold: 14 ft 9 1/2 in (4.5 m)
- Propulsion: Sails
- Complement: 155 (British establishment)
- Armament: French service: 16, or 18 × 18-pounder long guns,z; British service: 18 × 9-pounder guns + 2 × 32-pounder carronades (initially); 18 × 32-pounder carronades + 2 × 12-pounder bow chasers (later)

Etna was a French naval Etna-class ship-sloop launched in 1795 that the Royal Navy captured in November 1796. She was taken into service as HMS Aetna and renamed to HMS Cormorant the next year. She captured several merchant vessels and privateers before she was wrecked in 1800 off the coast of Egypt.

== Capture ==
Etna's first commander was lieutenant de vaisseau Coudre Lacoudrais. By the time of her capture off Barfleur, he had received a promotion to capitaine de frégate.

In the night of 13 to 14 November 1796, Etna departed Le Havre, and was chased in the morning by HMS Melampus and Childers, which she tried to distance. Melampus came within range around 15:30 Etna resisted for two hours before striking her colours as Childers joined the battle.

The London Gazette reported that on 13 November HMS Melampus and HMS Minerva drove a French navy corvette ashore near Barfleur. However the British were not able to get close enough to assure her destruction. Then Melampus and Childers captured another corvette, which was the Etna. Etna was armed with eighteen 12-pounder guns and had a crew of 137 men under the command of Citizen Joseph La Coudrais. The prisoners stated that both corvettes were carrying military and naval stores and that the corvette that had run ashore was the Etonnant. (Note: As no French naval vessel of the time bore the name, the ship is question is probably Etna's sister-ship, Étonnante, of eighteen 18-pounder guns.) Both were new ships on their first cruise.

Captain Coudre Lacoudrais was found innocent of the loss of his ship by the court-martial.

== British service ==
Etna arrived in Portsmouth in November and the Royal Navy took her into service as HMS Aetna. However, she then underwent fitting out until 25 July 1797. At some point she was renamed HMS Cormorant and was classed as a post ship. (Note: The British later captured her sister ships Torche and Mignonne, which however they classed as ship-sloops.)

Captain John Clarke Searle commissioned Cormorant in May 1797. On 14 November she recaptured George.

At some point Captain Lord Mark Kerr replaced Searle. While Cormorant was under Kerr's command, she, St Fiorenzo and Cynthia recaptured the American vessel Betty. Then on 24 November 1797 Cormorant was in company with Cynthia and Grand Falconer when they captured the French merchant sloop Necessaire.

In January 1798 Cormorant was in Sir Richard Strachan's squadron. On 15 February she captured the Prussian ship Welvaert. On 29 May Cormorant captured the brig Pruyiche Koopman.

Cormorant sailed for the Mediterranean in September 1798. Cormorant, HMS Argo, and HMS Pomone, convoyed a large fleet of merchantmen and transports to Lisbon. The convoy included the East Indiamen Royal Charlotte, Cuffnells, Phoenix, and Alligator. On 25 September the convoy encountered a French fleet of nine sail, consisting of one eighty-gun ship and eight frigates. The convoy commander signalled the Company's ships to form line of battle with the Royal Navy ships, and the convoy to push for Lisbon. This manoeuvre, and the warlike appearance of the Indiamen, deterred the French admiral from attacking them; the whole fleet reached Lisbon in safety.

On 27 October Cormorant captured the French privateer Tartar. In November she assisted in the British recapture of Minorca on 7 November. On 10 November she took possession in the harbour of Port Mahon of the Spanish ship Francisco Xavier, alias Esperansa, which had a cargo of drugs and bale goods and which had been on her way to Cadiz. A part of the proceeds of the prize money, head money, and the like for the capture of Minorca amounted to £20,000 and was paid in May 1800 to the British army and navy units involved.

On 2 January 1799, Cormorant captured the Spanish 12-gun packet Valiente (or Valianta) off Malaga. Letters received at Plymouth from Gibraltar reported that

Cormorant... had captured a Spanish packet from Rio di Plata for Barcelona, very valuable. One boat was lost in boarding the packet, crew saved. Lieutenant W. Wooltiridge then gallantly boarded her in the jolly boat with eight men, took possession of her though there were fifty five Spaniards, and brought her into Gibraltar.

Between 28 January and 9 February Cormorant cruised the Spanish coast with Centaur. Cormorant captured one tartane, drove another ashore, and captured a settee carrying oil.

Then on 16 March, Centaur and Cormorant chased the Spanish frigate Guadaloupe, of 40 guns. Centaur drove Guadaloupe aground near Cape Oropesa, where she was wrecked.

Cormorant parted company with Centaur during the chase and then on the 19th, as she was proceeding to the rendezvous, she sighted a brig. After a chase of four hours, Cormorant captured the Spanish naval brig Vincejo. Vincejo was armed with eighteen 6-pounder guns on her gun deck, six brass 4-pounders on her quarterdeck, and two on her forecastle. She also had a crew of 144 men. During the chase Vincejo threw six of her 6-pounders overboard. The Royal Navy took her into service as HMS Vincejo.

In September Captain Courtenay Boyle replaced Kerr. Also, at some point Cormorant captured the Spanish xebec Vergen de la Victoria.

On 2 December Cormorant was in sight and joined in the chase when Racoon encountered a French lugger. After an hour's chase Racoon captured her quarry, which proved to be the Vrai Decide, of 14 guns and four swivel guns. Vrai Decide had 41 men on board, under the command of Citizen Defgardi. The lugger was from Boulogne, had been out 30 hours in company with three other privateers, and had taken no prizes.

On 20 February 1800 Cormorant recaptured the Elizabeth Jane, of London, which had been sailing from the Bahamas. She had had 25 Frenchmen aboard. She separated from Cormorant on the 24th.

That evening at 45°45′N 010°29′W Cormorant captured the Spanish privateer brig Batador (or Battidor). Batador was armed with 14 guns and had a crew of 87 men. She was eight days out of St. Andero on a three-month cruise, but had not yet made any captures. The wind and seas were bad and it was difficult to get a prize crew of volunteers aboard Batador, and it proved impossible to remove the prisoners. The Spanish crew twice tried to recapture their vessel and were twice subdued.

== Fate ==
Cormorant was sailing to Egypt with dispatches for Sir Sidney Smith when she reached the African coast near Benghazi on 15 May. She then sailed for Alexandria, skirting the coast. That evening she ran hard aground in shallow water. In the morning the shore was visible about a mile and a half away, with what proved to be the town of Damietta, which is east of Alexandria, in the distance. When it became clear that they could not free Cormorant, the crew abandoned ship, reaching the shore on boats and rafts. There the French took them prisoner.

Boyle, his officers, and his men remained prisoners until their release on 27 July, having suffered a "cruel imprisonment and savage treatment". Boyle sailed to Cyprus and then Minorca. The subsequent court-martial at Minorca absolved Boyle of any blame, attributing the loss to the "great incorrectness" of the available charts.
