= HMS Galgo (1799) =

British naval brig-sloop 1799–1800

History

Spain
- Name: Galgo Inglés
- Namesake: The English greyhound
- Acquired: 5 May 1797 by capture
- Captured: 15 November 1799

Great Britain
- Name: HMS Galgo
- Acquired: 15 November 1799 by capture
- Fate: Foundered 9 October 1800

General characteristics
- Class & type: Corvette or brig-sloop
- Tons burthen: 395 bm (398 by calc.)
- Length: Overall: 99 ft (30.2 m); Keel: 89 ft 3 in (27.2 m)
- Beam: 29 ft (8.8 m)
- Depth of hold: 13 ft 0 in (4.0 m)
- Sail plan: Brig
- Complement: Spanish service: 110 men; British service:121 men
- Armament: 16 guns

HMS Galgo was a Jamaican privateer that the Spanish Navy captured in 1797 and named Galgo Inglés (English greyhound), and that the British captured in November 1799. In her brief career she detained, took, or destroyed a number of small prizes before October 1800, when she foundered, with the loss of most of her crew and passengers.

== Origin ==
On 5 May 1797 the Spanish frigate Juno captured a Jamaican privateer. The Spanish renamed their prize Galgo Inglés, suggesting that the privateer's name may have been Greyhound.

== Capture ==
In autumn 1799, a convoy of merchant vessels from England and Cork sailed to Jamaica under escort by the frigate Crescent and the sloop Calypso. The convoy was negotiating the Mona Passage and was 10 or 12 leagues south-west of Puerto Rico on the morning of 15 November when it encountered a small Spanish squadron that was sailing from Santo Domingo to Havana. (The squadron had been escorting a Spanish convoy out past the Bahama channel, and had been escorting a schooner delivering a large amount of money to Puerto Rico and Santo Domingo.

The Spanish vessels consisted of the 64-gun ship Asia, Commodore Don Francesco Montes, 40-gun frigate Anfitrite (or Amfitrite), Captain Don Diego Villogomez, and 16-gun ship-corvette Galgo Inglés, Captain Don Josef de Arias. Captain W.G. Lobb of Crescent attempted to draw the Spanish vessels away from the convoy, and when that failed, he had the convoy disperse.

The two larger Spanish ships made for that part of the convoy under escort by Calypso, but only captured the storeship General Goddard, the most valuable ship in the convoy. General Goddard might well have evaded capture had General Goddard's master paid attention and followed the signals from the escorts. The Spaniards reached Havana on 16 December, having captured a schooner as well on the way. The value of their prizes, including the naval stores, which they found of great use, was 440,000 pesos.

Galgo, which had separated from the other two Spanish vessels the day before, sailed for the part of the convoy under escort by Crescent, which captured Galgo Inglés. The rest of the convoy arrived safely at Port Royal, Jamaica, some on 21 November with Calypso, and the remainder on 23 November with Crescent.

Lieutenant William Dillon sailed Galgo Inglés to Jamaica, and then assumed the position of first lieutenant on Crescent. The British took Galgo Inglés into service as HMS Galgo. (The Admiralty intended to change her name to Chance, but she foundered before this took effect.

== British service ==
The Royal Navy commissioned Galgo under Commander George S. Stovin. In her brief career Galgo did take some prizes. Before May 1800 she captured a number of vessels: the Danish sloop Ark, of two guns, sailing from St Thomas to Jamaica in ballast; a Spanish schooner with a cargo of mahogany; the Spanish schooner Santa Catalina, carrying dry goods; the Spanish schooner Del Carmen, sailing from Puerto Rico to Jamaica; the Spanish vessel Bona Ventura; the Spanish vessel Dolorosa; and the Spanish vessel Nostra Senora del Carmen.

Then between May and September she detained or took more vessels: Spanish schooner Del Carmen, sailing from Kingston to Santiago de Cuba with dry goods; a French boat sailing from Jeremiah to Santiago de Cuba with coffee; the French schooner Resource, carrying dry goods; the American schooner Ark, in ballast, but with 1,300 dollars; a French schooner laden with coffee (destroyed); and a Spanish schooner from the Main, carrying horses.

When Lord Hugh Seymour transferred from the Leeward Islands to Jamaica, he sent Galgo to relieve Surinam, that she and her captain, Lieutenant Christopher Cole, might join him. However, the loss of Galgo frustrated this plan.

== Loss ==
Before she foundered, one naval officer who had dined aboard her, described her as

...how very sharp and crank the brig appeared, and that being (to use a trite phrase) "all legs and wings like a butterfly", I should not like to belong to her, from a conviction, that if she ever was caught in one of the "white squalls" so peculiar to the climate, she would, in all probability, be converted into a wholesale coffin for all hands.

Galgo sailed from Jamaica on 9 September. On 9 October she was sailing off Virginia when just before midnight, as the wind picked up, the master, Thomas Forest, came on deck. He recommended a reduction in her sail area. Captain Stovin agreed, but while the crew was taking in some of the sails, a squall hit that pushed Galgo on her side. She quickly filled with water and sank within five minutes. Ninety-six crew members, including Captain Stovin, and some 19 passengers drowned, including three women; 25 men survived by hanging on to wreckage. A report from a survivor stated that when she fell over, Stovin exclaimed "Good God! she's over! I can't swim." (Note: Forest later wrote in a letter to his brother that the capsizing occurred at 26°1′N 60°56′W.)

Next morning, Hunter, an American ship under the command of Captain John McClintock and sailing from the West Indies to Bristol, (Note: This account mentions passim, that there were 29 survivors. Another report says 25.) happened to come by and rescued the survivors. Hunter took the survivors to New England, where several deserted the Royal Navy.

As a consequence of the loss of Galgo, the Admiralty sent out an order barring the purchase of any more vessels captured from the enemy. This was a misfortune for Captain Milne of Seine, who had just captured the French frigate Vengeance. Still, the Admiralty must have relented as they did purchase Vengeance, and subsequently other vessels.
