= HMS Brilliant (1779) =

Enterprise-class Royal Navy frigate

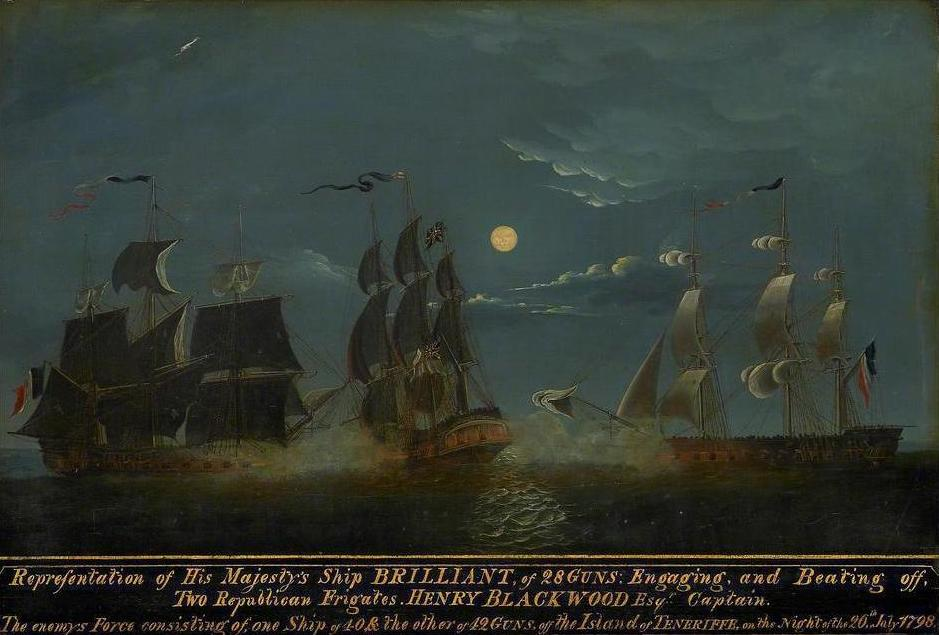
- His Majesty's Ship Brilliant, of 28 guns: Engaging and Beating off Two Republican Frigates

History

Great Britain
- Name: HMS Brilliant
- Ordered: 9 October 1776
- Builder: Henry Adams, Bucklers Hard
- Laid down: February 1777
- Launched: 15 July 1779
- Completed: 4 September 1779 (at Portsmouth Dockyard)
- Commissioned: July 1779
- Fate: Broken up November 1811

General characteristics
- Class & type: 28-gun Enterprise-class sixth-rate frigate
- Tons burthen: 59982/94 (bm)
- Length: 120 ft 6 1/4 in (36.735 m) (overall); 99 ft 6 in (30.33 m) (keel)
- Beam: 33 ft 8 in (10.3 m)
- Depth of hold: 11 ft 0 in (3.35 m)
- Sail plan: Full-rigged ship
- Complement: 200 officers and men
- Armament: Upper deck: 24 × 9-pounder guns; QD: 4 × 6-pounder guns + 4 × 18-pounder carronades; FC: 2 × 18-pounder carronades; 12 × swivel guns

HMS Brilliant was a 28-gun Enterprise-class sixth-rate frigate of the Royal Navy. Brilliant was first commissioned in July 1779 under the command of Captain John Ford.

== American Revolution ==
Brilliant was stationed at Gibraltar during the Great Siege. In June 1782 the garrison there launched 12 gunboats. Each was armed with an 18-pounder gun, and received a crew of 21 men drawn from Royal Navy vessels stationed at Gibraltar. Brilliant provided crews for six: Defiance, Dreadnought, Resolution, Revenge, Spitfire, and Thunder.

On 13 and 14 September and 11 October, the garrison destroyed a number of floating batteries. In December 1784 there was a distribution of £30,000 in bounty money for the batteries and the proceeds of the sale of ships stores, including those of San Miguel. A second payment of £16,000 followed in November 1785. A third payment, this of £8,000, followed in August 1786. June 1788 saw the payment of a fourth tranche, this of £4,000. Brilliant's officers and crew shared in all four.

== French Revolutionary Wars ==
Between July 1796 and October 1798 Brilliant's captain was Henry Blackwood. On 27 July, at Tenerife, Brilliant observed the frigates Vertu and Régénérée preparing to sail for Rochefort. At 6, the French frigates sailed and started firing on Brilliant; Régénérée was closing in on her opponent when Vertu, which had sailed large, touched the wind; Régénérée imitated her manoeuvre, but lost her mizzen and bowsprit, allowing Brilliant to flee. Vertu gave chase, but could not overhaul her opponent and returned to Tenerife. There, Régénérée replaced her rigging, and both frigates eventually arrived in Rochefort on 5 September.

On 25 August 1800, the 74-gun Impétueux, Brilliant, 16-gun ship-sloop Cynthia and the 14-gun hired cutter St Vincent silenced a battery that was armed with eight 24-pounders. Then seamen from the ships landed to assist a large force of army troops to haul the guns up to the heights. The army withdrew the same day after a skirmish with Spanish troops.

At the end of the month, Brilliant was in a detachment under Samuel Hood that captured a French privateer, Gueppe, in a cutting-out expedition. Gueppe, a flush-deck ship of 300 tons and carrying 18 guns, was initially in the harbour at Vigo but, when the British force entered the bay on 29 August, was moved to near the Narrows of Redondela where she anchored below a shore battery. Hood selected two boats from Brilliant, HMS Stag, HMS Amethyst, HMS Amelia, and HMS Cynthia, four boats from HMS Courageaux, with additional boats from Renown, London, and Impetueux to take part in the action. The boats left at 21:00 and arrived alongside their quarry at 00:40 the following morning. Despite fierce resistance, Gueppe was taken within 15 minutes of boarding, after having 25 of her crew killed and forty wounded.

On 8 September Brilliant sent the prize Dragon into Plymouth. She was a packet of 14 guns, bound for L'Orient from Guadeloupe and carrying a cargo of cocoa, coffee, indigo and cotton.

== Napoleonic Wars ==
On 25 June 1805, Loire had been chasing a French frigate privateer for some twelve hours when Melampus and Brilliant came up and cut-off the quarry, forcing her to surrender. She was the Valiant (or Vaillant) of Bordeaux. She was armed with twenty-four 18-pounder guns on her main deck and six 6-pounders, which she threw overboard while Loire was pursuing her. She had a crew of 240 men. She had been out for 20 days on a four-month cruise but had only captured the Halifax packet Lord Charles Spencer. The Royal Navy took Vaillant into service as HMS Barbette.

On 8 October 1807 Brilliant and Boreas captured the Danish ships St Hans and Montreal.

On 20 October 1808 Brilliant was in company with Pheasant and the hired armed lugger Sandwich, when they discovered the Revenue cutter Active chasing a French privateer. The British were able to capture their quarry, which turned out to be the lugger Pointe du Jour, of Roscow. She was armed with three guns and carried a crew of 30 men. Captain Thomas Smyth reported that she "has cruized successfully against our Trade." Lloyd's List reported that Break of Day was armed with two swivel guns and had a crew of 32 men. She had captured Mary, Bibias, master, off the Eddystone. Mary had been coming from New Brunswick The excise cutter Active had recaptured Mary the same day. Break of Day had also captured on 16 September Leeds Merchant of and for Weymouth, which had been sailing to Guernsey, and Success, of Milford, which had been sailing from Youghal to Southampton.

== Fate ==
Brilliant was broken up at Portsmouth in November 1811.
