= William Henry Dillon =

British Royal Navy admiral (1779–1857)

Vice-Admiral Sir William Henry Dillon KCH
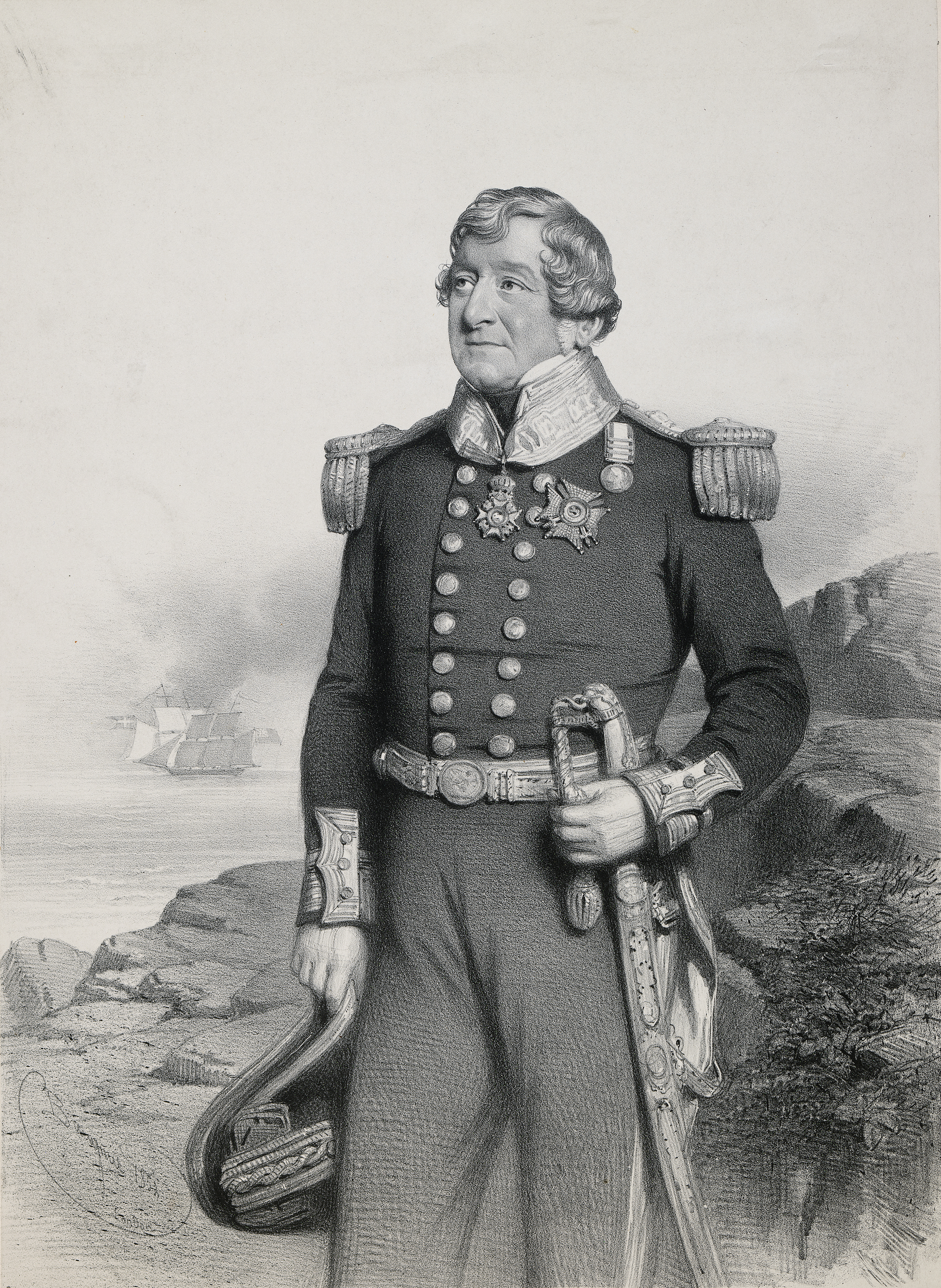
- Born: 8 August 1779; Birmingham, England
- Died: 9 September 1857 (aged 78)
- Military career
- Allegiance: Great Britain United Kingdom
- Branch: Royal Navy
- Service years: 1790–1857
- Rank: Vice-Admiral
- Commands: HMS Childers; HMS Leopard; HMS Russell
- Conflicts: French Revolutionary Wars; Glorious First of June; Battle of Groix; Napoleonic Wars; Capture of Galgo; Walcheren Expedition

Vice-Admiral Sir William Henry Dillon KCH (8 August 1779 – 9 September 1857) was a British naval officer.

== Biography ==
Dillon was born in Birmingham in 1779, illegitimate son of Sir John Talbot Dillon, and Elizabeth Collins. He entered the navy in May 1790 and served as a midshipman under Captain Gambier in Defence, and was stunned by a splinter in the action of 1 June 1794. He was present in Lord Bridport's action off Ile de Groix on 23 June 1795, and at the reduction of St. Lucie in May 1796, when he carried a flag of truce to take possession of Pigeon Island. Having become an acting-lieutenant in Glenmore in 1798, he co-operated with the army during the Wexford Rebellion, where he succeeded in arresting the Irish chief Skallian.

As a lieutenant on board Crescent on the Jamaica station, he participated in the capture of the Spanish corvette Galgo in the Mona Passage, and sailed her back to Jamaica. As senior-lieutenant of the Africaine, he was sent with a flag of truce from Lord Keith to the Dutch commodore, Valterbach, at Helvoetsluys on 20 July 1803. Against the rules of war he was made a prisoner, handed over to the French, and detained in captivity until September 1807.

On 8 April 1805, during his captivity, he had been promoted to commander, and on obtaining his release he took the command of the sloop Childers, carrying only fourteen 12-pound carronades and sixty-five men. In her, on 14 March 1808, on the coast of Norway, after a long action, drove off the Danish twenty-gun brig Lougen. In this service he was severely wounded, and his gallant conduct was acknowledged by the Lloyd's Patriotic Fund, which presented him a sword valued at one hundred guineas. After promotion to post-captain he served at the Walcheren Expedition, on the coasts of Portugal and Spain, at Newfoundland, in China, India, and finally in the Mediterranean, in command of the 74-gun third rate Russell, when he rendered much service to the Spanish cause.

In 1812 he visited Oran in HMS Leopard, and anchored off Algiers, observing American (including Jewish) slaves. He wrote:

'During my leisure hours I had visited the grounds where the Christian slaves had to work. It was a painful sight to behold those poor fellows under the lash of the Moor, watching all their actions and inflicting a cut with his whip if he noticed anyone idle. Several spoke to me, and I could not give them any hopes. Whilst listening to their misfortunes, a fine youth came and caught hold of the skirt of my coat. At first, from his handsome and feminine appearance, I thought it was a female addressing me, but he soon undeceived me. He was an American, a lad of about 17, most beautifully limbed: in other respects the most exquisite shape I have ever beheld. Never had I seen such a lovely figure of the male sex. However, painful as it was to refuse the supplications of this Adonis, his being subject of the United States, I explained to him, prevented my interference in his behalf, and I hurried away from the spot, regretting that I had been near it.

The next thing that deserved notice were the projecting iron hooks upon the outward walls of the bastion, upon which are hurled from the upper parts those victims who are sentenced to death. The sight of this place filled my mind with horror, and I hastened away. It was not considered safe for an officer of my rank to walk about in the town....'

Dillon was promoted to flag rank on 9 November 1846. He was nominated as a Knight Commander of the Royal Guelphic Order (KCH) on 13 January 1835, and on 24 June was knighted by William IV at St. James's Palace. In 1839 he received the good-service pension. He was gazetted a vice-admiral of the blue on 5 March 1853, and of the red in 1857, and died on 9 September 1857, leaving in manuscript an account of his professional career, with a description of the many scenes in which he had been engaged.

== See also ==
- O'Byrne, William Richard (1849). "Dillon, William Henry" . A Naval Biographical Dictionary . John Murray – via Wikisource.
