= French ship Vaillant (1801) =

French naval ship (1801–1805)

History

France
- Name: Vaillant
- Builder: Bordeaux
- Launched: 1801
- Captured: June 1805

United Kingdom
- Name: HMS Barbette
- Acquired: June 1805 by capture
- Fate: Sold for breaking up in May 1811

General characteristics
- Displacement: 400 tons (French)
- Tons burthen: 605 (bm)
- Length: French:37.80m; Royal Navy; 124 ft 0 in (37.8 m) (gundeck); 101 ft 5 3/4 in (30.9 m) (keel)
- Beam: French:10.22m; Royal Navy:33 ft 6 3/4 in (10.2 m)
- Draught: 5.03m
- Depth of hold: 16 ft 6 in (5.0 m)
- Complement: Privateer; 1801:120; 1803:272; 1805:221; Royal Navy:173
- Armament: Privateer; 1801:4 × 8-pounder guns + 18 × 18-pounder carronades; 1803:22 × 8-pounder guns + 4 × 4-pounder guns + 2 × 18-pounder carronades; 1805:22 × 8-pounder guns + 6 × 4-pounder guns + 2 × 18-pounder carronades; Royal Navy: Upperdeck: 22 × 9-pounder guns; QD: 8 × 18-pounder carronades

Vaillant was a privateer corvette launched in 1801 at Bordeaux. She made several cruises before the British Royal Navy captured her in June 1805. The Navy took her into service as HMS Barbette but never commissioned her or fitted her for sea. It sold her for breaking up in 1811.

== Career ==
=== Privateer ===
Vaillant was commissioned in January 1801.

1st cruise (1801): Captain Alexandre Etienne

2nd cruise (1802): Captain Destebetcho

3rd cruise (August to December 1803): Captain Alexandre Etienne

On 2 December Vaillant encountered the merchant ship Rachael at 49°10′N 11°00′W as Rachael was returning to England from Honduras. Vaillant captured Rachael and sent her for Bordeaux. But on 6 December HMS Goliath recaptured Rachael.

Last cruise: Captain Dettebecho (?) the Elder. Lloyd's List (LL) carried a report from the French papers that Vaillant had captured the packet boat Brilliant, from the West Indies. The crew had landed in France.

=== Capture ===
HMS Loire encountered Vaillant (Valiant) on 26 June 1805 and gave chase. After 12 hours Vaillant had to surrender when Melampus and Brilliant arrived on the scene and cut her off. Captain Maitland, of Loire, stated that had they not come up the chase would have taken two more hours; she had thrown her six 6-pounder guns overboard during the chase. She had been out for 20 days on a four-month cruise but had only captured the Halifax packet Lord Charles Spencer. Maitland described her as "one of the most complete Ships ever fitted out at Bourdeaux, and is perfectly calculated to be taken into His Majesty's Service; sails incomparably fast...".

=== Royal Navy ===
The Royal Navy purchased Vaillant and brought her into the Royal Navy as the 6th-rate HMS Barbette, but never commissioned her or fitted her for sea. The Navy sold her in May 1811 for breaking up.
