= French corvette Mignonne =

Mignonne
History

France
- Name: Mignonne
- Builder: Cherbourg Dockyard; Construteurs: Pierre Ozanne and from March 1793, Jean-François Lafosse
- Laid down: 1794
- Launched: 15 October 1795
- Captured: June 1803

United Kingdom
- Name: Mignonne
- Namesake: French: "Dainty"Mignon/mignonne at Wiktionary
- Acquired: by capture June 1803
- Fate: Ran aground, December 1804

General characteristics
- Type: Corvette
- Displacement: 650-719 ton (French)
- Tons burthen: c.564 (bm) (Note: This is based on the descriptions of the three members of the class that the Royal Navy captured, as described in Winfield.)
- Length: 35.95 m (117.9 ft) (overall); 32.48 m (106.6 ft) (keel)
- Beam: 9.74 m (32.0 ft)
- Draught: 4.68 m (15.4 ft) (unladen)
- Depth of hold: 4.82 m (15.8 ft)
- Propulsion: Sail
- Complement: 121 (British establishment)
- Armament: French service: 16 × 18-pounder long guns; At capture: 10 × 18-pounder long guns; British service: 18 × 9-pounder guns

Mignonne was an 18-gun Etna-class corvette of the French Navy, launched in 1795. She served until 1803 when the British captured her. Though she served briefly, there is no record of her actually being commissioned into the Royal Navy; she grounded and was condemned in 1804.

== French service and capture ==
Mignonne was built in Cherbourg from 1794 to 1797 and was launched on 15 October 1795. Between 3 and 16 September 1797, she served at Cherbourg under commander Jourdan.

Under Lieutenant Yset, she took part in the Caribbean campaign led by Admiral Louis Thomas Villaret de Joyeuse in 1803. She was involved in the capture of Fort Graville on 6 February, and Camp de Louise on 8 February.

On 28 June 1803, as she sailed with the frigate Poursuivante, she encountered a British convoy off San Domingo, part of the Blockade of Saint-Domingue. One of the escorts, HMS Goliath, was sailing inshore off Cape Nicholas Mole, to try to find two vessels seen earlier. Goliath encountered Mignonne at 10:45, and after a few shots captured her at 11:45. In Captain James Brisbane's words, Mignonne was a "remarkable fast sailing Ship Corvette". She carried sixteen long 18-pounder guns, six of which she had landed. (Note: Admiral Markham, who ordered Mignonne surveyed and valued prior to purchase, stated that she was carrying ten guns, having left eight at Aux-Cayes (Les Cayes).) Her crew of only 80 men was under Commander Jean-Pierre Bargeau, and she was two days out of Aux-Cayes, sailing to France via the Cape.

== British service ==
Mignonne was among a number of British prizes that arrived at Jamaica between 2 and 16 July.

The Royal Navy took her into service as the 18-gun ship sloop-of-war HMS Mignonne, but never commissioned her. Her captain was Commander Edward Hawker. (Note: He had been promoted to commander in 1803 and he received his promotion to post captain in June 1804, though he served on Mignonne for some time thereafter.)

In June 1804, Mignonne ran ashore off Lucca, Jamaica. Desiree was towing her to Port Royal when on 9 July, at 0100 hours, a bolt of lightning struck Mignonne, killing three seamen, injuring five (or nine), and causing some damage to the ship. Hawker reported that the bolt shattered the topmast and split the mainmast to the keelson.

On 13 October Mignonne captured the French brig St. Antonio y les Animas, which was in ballast.

== Fate ==
In December 1804 Mignonne was laid in the mud at Port Royal, Jamaica. She was then condemned.
