= French corvette Cérès (1795) =

18-gun corvette of the French Navy

History

France
- Name: Cérès
- Namesake: Ceres
- Builder: Le Havre
- Laid down: May 1794
- Launched: May 1795
- In service: October 1795
- Fate: Wrecked 17 February 1798

General characteristics
- Type: Corvette
- Displacement: 642-719 tons (French)
- Tons burthen: c.564 (bm) (Note: This is based on the descriptions of the three members of the class that the Royal Navy captured, as described in Winfield.)
- Length: 35.9 metres
- Beam: 9.7 metres
- Draught: 5.2 metres
- Propulsion: Sail
- Complement: 122–198
- Armament: 18 × 18-pounder long guns (1798)

Cérès was an 18-gun Etna-class corvette of the French Navy, launched in 1795. Begun in 1794 as Courageuse, the corvette was renamed Cérès in May 1795 and launched the same month. In 1797, she was again renamed, as Enfant de la Patrie. She was wrecked on the shores of Norway on 17 February 1798.
