= Rachael (1801 ship) =

History

United Kingdom
- Name: Rachel
- Builder: Spain
- Launched: 1795
- Acquired: 1801
- Fate: Wrecked c.1810

General characteristics
- Tons burthen: 224, or 228, or 230(bm)
- Sail plan: Brig
- Complement: 1803:30; 1807:20
- Armament: 1801:26 × 6-pounder guns; 1803:16 x 6&12-pounder guns; 1807:16 × 6-pounder guns; 1807:6 × 9 + 10 × 6-pounder guns; 1810:14 × 6-pounder guns

Rachael (or Rachel) was launched in 1795 at Spain and may have been taken in prize in 1799. She entered British records in 1801. In 1803 she suffered a maritime mishap, and later was captured by a French privateer, but recaptured by the British Royal Navy. She was lost at Fayal, Azores in 1810.

== Career ==
Rachel first appeared in Lloyd's Register (LR) in 1801 with S.Elison, master, Hunter & Co., owner, and trade Liverpool–Suriname. She had undergone small repairs in 1801.

On 22 February 1803 Lloyd's List (LL) reported that Rachel, Ellison, master, had come from Cadiz and had run aground on the Parade Bank in Liverpool Bay on 16 February 1803. She was gotten off and then was at Liverpool, full of water.

Captain Seacombe Ellison acquired a letter of marque on 25 June 1803.

Year	Master	Owner	Trade	Source & notes
1803	S.Ellison	Cass & Co.	Liverpool–Cadiz; Liverpool–Honduras	LR; small repairs 1801; damages repaired and bottom almost new 1803

On 2 December as Rachael was returning to England from Honduras, she encountered the French privateer Vaillant at 49°10′N 11°00′W. Vaillant captured Rachael and sent her for Bordeaux.

On 6 December 1803 HMS Goliath recaptured Rachael. After arbitration Goliath had to share the prize money with HMS Defiance. Rachael came into Plymouth.

Year	Master	Owner	Trade	Source & notes
1805	S.Ellison; R.Blackburn	Cass & Co.	Liverpool–Honduras	LR; small repairs 1801; damages repaired and bottom almost new 1803
1807	R.Blackburn; J.Williams	R.Kitchen	Liverpool–Africa	LR; small repairs 1801; damages repaired and bottom almost new 1803

Captain Joseph Williams acquired a letter of marque on 16 September 1807. On 17 October 1808 Rachael, Williams, master, was on her way back to Liverpool from Africa when she had to put in to Bristol in some distress.

Year	Master	Owner	Trade	Source & notes
1809	J.Williams; J.Wylie	Twemlow	Liverpool–Africa	LR; small repairs 1801; damages repaired and bottom almost new 1803
1810	J.Wylie	Twemlow	Liverpool–Suriname	LR; small repairs 1801; damages repaired and bottom almost new 1803

== Fate ==
Lloyd's List reported on 20 March 1810 that Rachel, Wylie, master, had been wrecked at Fayal with the loss by drowning of Wylie and five of his crew. The Register of Shipping (RS) for 1810 had the annotation "LOST" by her name.
