= HMS Trompeuse (1799) =

Sloop of the Royal Navy

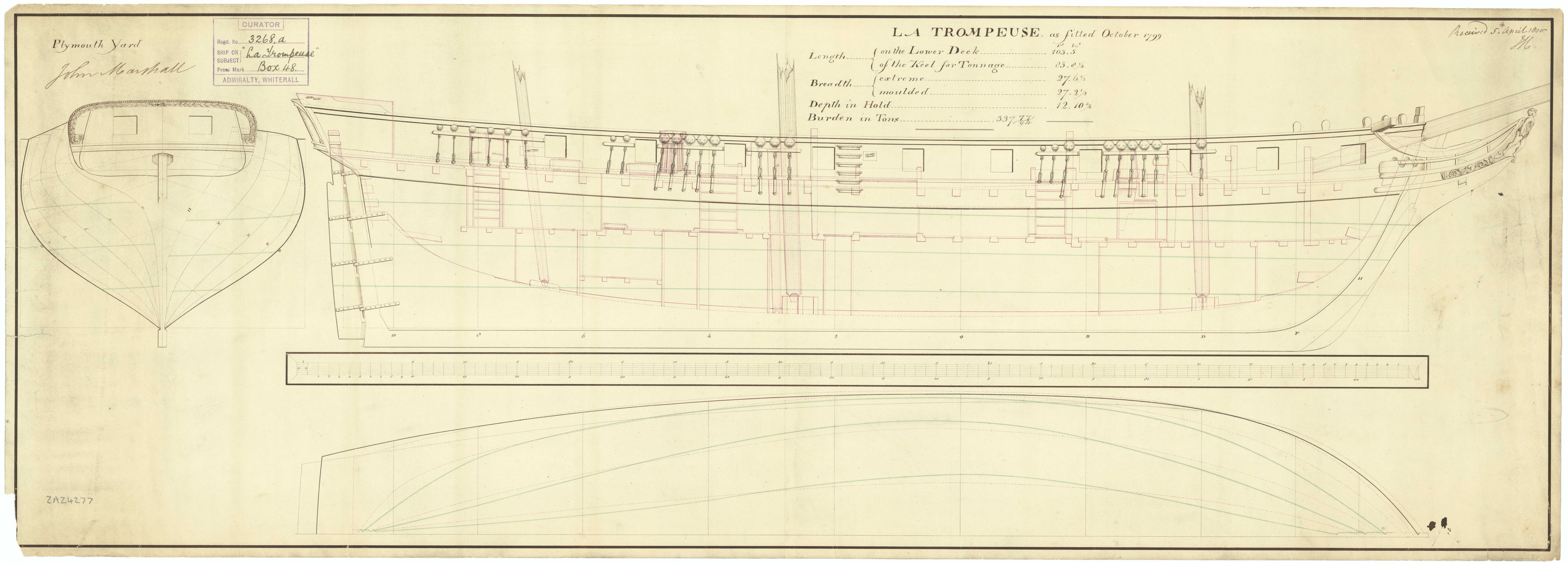
- Trompeuse

History

Great Britain
- Name: HMS Trompeuse
- Acquired: May 1799
- Fate: Foundered in the English Channel, 17 May 1800.

General characteristics
- Class & type: sloop
- Tons burthen: 33777/94 (bm)
- Length: Overall: 103 ft 5 in (31.52 m); Keel:83 ft 8 1/4 in (25.508 m)
- Beam: 27 ft 6 1/2 in (8.395 m)
- Depth of hold: 12 ft 10 3/4 in (3.931 m)
- Propulsion: Sails
- Complement: 96
- Armament: 16 × 24-pounder carronades + 2 × 6-pounder guns

HMS Trompeuse was the French privateer Mercure, captured in 1799. She foundered in the English Channel in 1800.

== Origins ==
British records on Mercure are ambiguous. French records are more informative.

Two fundamental British references declare that Melampus captured Mercure in May 1797. However, there is no letter in the London Gazette for Melampus capturing a Mercure in 1797, which by itself is not unusual, but two other sources, one of them a letter in the London Gazette by the captain of Melampus, puts his capture of a Mercure in February 1799 (see below).

Winfield has Mercure being named Trompeuse and registered in September 1798. He reports that she was then commissioned into the Royal Navy a year later under Commander John Parker Robinson.

However, there was an earlier capture of a privateer Mercure whose dates better fit these facts. On 31 August 1798, Phaeton and Anson captured the French privateer Mercure, pierced for 20 guns but carrying 18, and with a crew of 132 men. She had sailed from Bordeaux the day before and was a new vessel, copper-bottomed and fastened.

French sources are clearer. The French ship-owner Michel Delastelle fitted Mercure out in 1798 and appointed Charles Delastelle, a relative of his, as captain. Mercure was a 200-ton ("of load"), 16-gun privateer from Saint-Malo commissioned around November 1797 with a crew of 97 men under Delastelle.

On her first cruise she took no prizes. Actually, she took one prize, but the Royal Navy recaptured it. On 17 June 1798 Mercure captured Crescent as Crescent was returning to London from China. However, on 29 June the frigate HMS Caroline recaptured Crescent. Crescent was brought into Falmouth.

Mercure did another cruise later under Jacques Dupuy-Fromy from January 1799. On her second cruise, under captain Jacques Fromy, she took two prizes. However the value of the prizes probably was no more than the cost of provisioning her and paying advances to the crew.

HMS Melampus captured Mercure on 26 February 1799, in the Bay of Biscay. Mercure was armed with 16 guns and had a crew of 103 men. She was from Saint Malo and was returning to her home port after having had a successful cruise in the Channel.

== Fate ==
Trompeuse disappeared in the Channel in May 1800. She was last seen on 17 May near the French coast during a severe storm and is presumed to have foundered. Two other vessels, the hired armed cutter Lady Jane and the ship sloop Railleur were lost in the same storm.
