= Hired armed cutter Saint Vincent =

St Vincent was a hired armed cutter that served the Royal Navy from 16 March 1798 to 29 April 1802, during the French Revolutionary Wars. She was of 194 13/94 tons burthen, and carried fourteen 6-pounder guns.

In 1800, she was under the command of Lieutenant John Leckle, (also Leekly or Lackey) at Falmouth. She was employed in cruising in search of privateers and escorting convoys to and from the Downs. She arrived at Portsmouth on 12 July and sailed for a cruise off Cherbourg. She returned on 20 August with a prize, the Danish galiot Friendship, laden with merchandise and bound for Lisbon from Amsterdam.

On 25 August, the 74-gun Impétueux, the 28-gun frigate Brilliant, 16-gun ship-sloop Cynthia, and the 14-gun hired cutter St Vincent silenced a battery that was armed with eight 24-pounders. Then, seamen from the ships landed to assist a large force of army troops to haul the guns up to the heights. The army withdrew the same day after a skirmish with Spanish troops.

Saint Vincent sailed again on 14 September to join Harpy, which had sailed a few days earlier. She took a convoy to the westward at the beginning of October and on 7 October brought in the transport Ocean with troops for Jersey. In company with the hired cutter Earl Spencer she sailed for a cruise off the French coast on 28 October and returned on 11 November. Her last cruise from Portsmouth lasted from 15 November to 11 December and after taking a convoy to the Downs on 21 December she sailed for Plymouth. Lieutenant Lackey was promoted to be first lieutenant of HMS Latona. His replacement on Earl St Vincent was Lieutenant Campbell, who had been first lieutenant of Latona.
