= Lascelles (1779 EIC ship) =

1779 British East India Company ship

History
- Name: Lascelles
- Namesake: The Lascelles family (Note: The Lascelles family had connections with the company. Henry Lascelles had been a director of the company from 1737 to 1745.)
- Owner: EIC voyages 1-6: Sir Alexander Hamilton; EIC voyage 7–8:Robert Wigram; 1798:A. Fleming
- Builder: Wells, Deptford
- Launched: 12 October 1779
- Fate: Broken up 1807

General characteristics
- Tons burthen: 758; later 824 (bm)
- Length: 143 ft 10 in (43.8 m) (overall); 116 ft 9 in (35.6 m) (keel)
- Beam: 35 ft 3 in (10.7 m)
- Depth of hold: 14 ft 9 in (4.5 m)
- Propulsion: Sail
- Complement: 1794: 95; 1799:40
- Armament: 1794: 12 × 12&6-pounder guns + 8 × 12-pounder carronades; 1799: 20 × 12&6-pounder guns
- Notes: Three decks

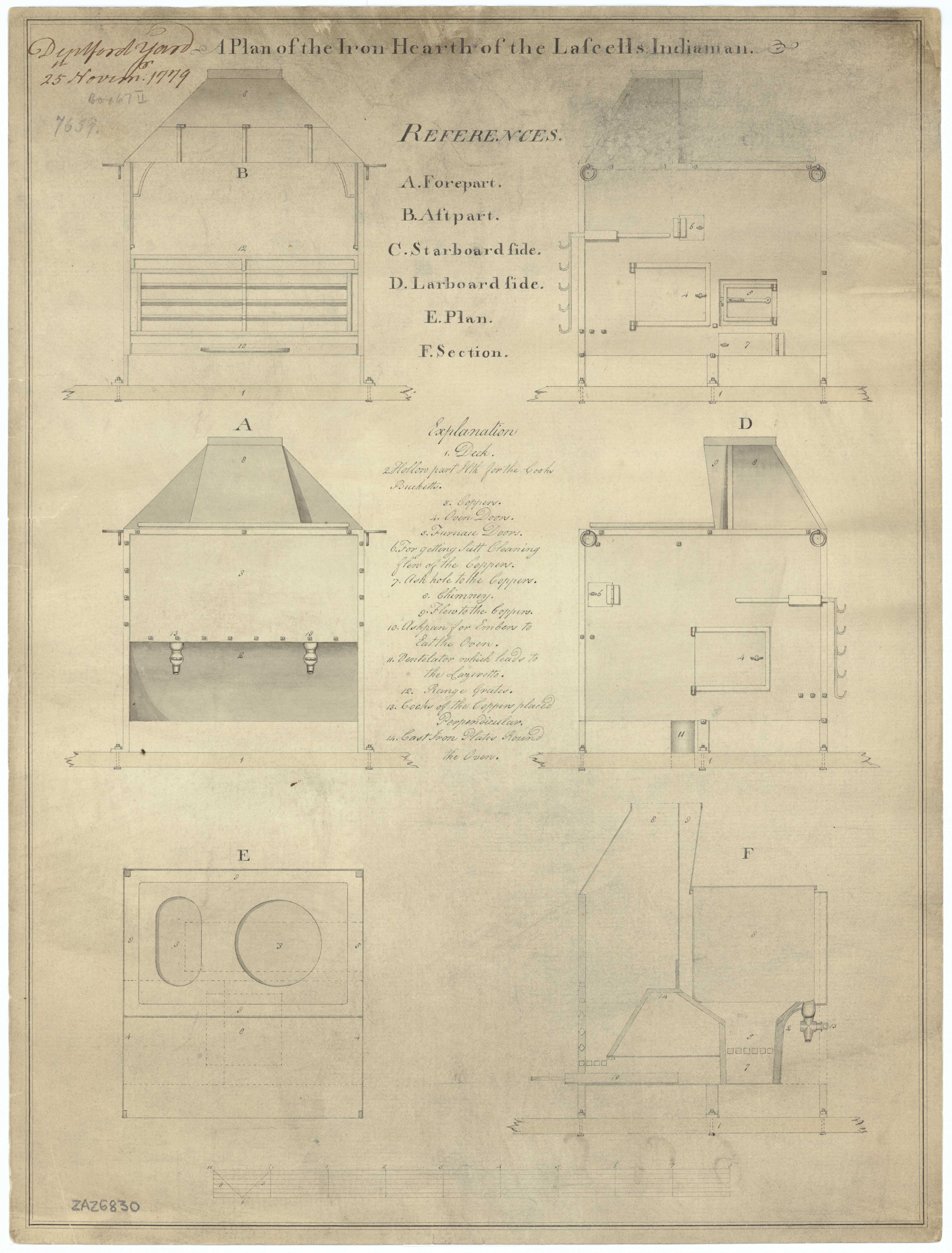
Plan of the hearth on the Lascelles drawn for the Deptford Yard, signed off on 25 November 1779

Lascelles was launched in 1779 as an East Indiaman. She made eight voyages for the British East India Company (EIC), and then briefly became a West Indiaman. She was sold to the government for use as a storeship, but was broken up in 1807.

== Career ==
=== EIC voyages ===
EIC voyage #1 (1780–1781): Madras and China. Captain Thomas Wakefield sailed from Portsmouth on 12 February 1780, bound for Madras and China. Lascelles reached Madras on 29 June and Malacca on 19 August; she arrived at Whampoa anchorage on 15 September. Homeward bound, she crossed the Second Bar on 7 January 1781, reached St Helena on 25 June, and arrived at The Downs on 19 October.

EIC voyage #2 (1783–1784): Captain Wakefield sailed from Portsmouth on 11 March 1783, bound for Madras and China, and arrived back at The Downs on 12 July 1784.

EIC voyage #3 (1785–1786): Captain Wakefield sailed from The Downs on 1 March 1785, bound for China. Lascelles arrived at Whampoa on 26 July. Homeward bound, she crossed the Second Bar on 15 October, reached St Helena on 16 February 1786, and arrived at the Downs on 28 April.

EIC voyage #4 (1787–1788): Captain Richard A. Farrington sailed from The Downs on 17 January 1787, bound for Madras and China. Lascelles reached the Cape of Good Hope on 6 April and Madras on 28 May. She arrived at Whampoa on 1 September. Homeward bound, she crossed the Second Bar on 10 December.

Lascalles left China on 23 January 1788. On 23 January she came upon Captain Wood and the crew of the EIC's packet Charlotte, stranded on Crocotoa. Charlotte had grounded on the reef and Wood had moved some of her stores to shore to lighten her to enable him to get her off when a Malay proa had arrived. Wood and his men fired small arms at the Malays, who returned fire with 3-pounder guns from their proa. The Malays plundered Charlotte and set fire to her. Farrington gave Wood Lascelles's cutter, together with her mast, oars, and some supplies, as Wood wished to wait for the rest of the homeward-bound EIC China fleet to pass as he had dispatches for them.

Lascelles reached St Helena on 21 March 1788 and arrived at the Downs on 21 May.

EIC voyage #5 (1789–1790): Captain Farrington sailed from Plymouth on 4 April 1789.

On 31 May Lascelles ran down Vryheid. Vryheid was sailing from Cadiz to Amsterdam and sank about five leagues from shore in water five to six fathoms deep. Eight men saved and three men were lost. Carl Piaters brought the survivors into Eastbourne. She was carrying a valuable cargo. (Note: Per the manifest, her cargo consisted of 38 bales and cases of unknown merchandise, eight serons (packages) of indigo, 23 barrels of cochineal, 115 cases of Jesuit's bark, two bags of Spanish wool, five packs of sarsaparilla, 2300 Buenos Aires hides, 10,000 Spanish dollars, 1745 pieces of logwood, and 65 lasts of salt.)

Lascelles arrived at Whampoa on 30 August. Homeward bound, she crossed the Second Bar on 29 November, reached St Helena on 24 February 1790, and arrived at the Downs on 25 April.

EIC voyage #6 (1792–1793): Captain Farrington sailed from The Downs on 6 April 1792, bound for China. Lascelles arrived at Whampoa on 26 August. Homeward bound, she crossed the Second Bar on 12 November, reached St Helena on 28 February 1793, and arrived at the Downs on 2 May.

The EIC inspected the East Indiamen as they arrived and on 15 October fined Farrington and eight other captains £100 each for having not stowed their cargoes in conformance with the Company's orders. The money was to go to Poplar Hospital. (Note: There was a second assessment, on 30 July 1794 of a fine, but whether this was a restatement or a separate assessment is unclear.)

EIC voyage #7 (1794–1796): War with France had broken out shortly before Lascelles returned from her sixth voyage. Captain Francis Kempt acquired a letter of marque on 13 June 1794. He sailed from Plymouth on 14 August 1794, bound for Bengal. Lascelles was at Madeira on 5 September, and arrived at Diamond Harbour on 14 February. Homeward bound, she was at Saugor on 26 April. She was at Madras on 22 July and Trincomalee on 13 August. She reached St Helena on y November, and Milford Haven on 3 January 1796. She arrived at Long Reach on 22 February.

EIC voyage #8 (1796–1798): Captain Kempt sailed from Portsmouth on 11 August 1796, bound for Bengal. Lascelles reached the Cape on 18 November and Madras on 17 February 1797. She arrived at Diamond Harbour 18 March.

The British government chartered Lascelles, together with numerous other Indiamen and country ships, to serve as a transport in a planned attack on Manila. Lascelles was at Saugor on 8 July and Madras again on 15 August.

When the British Government cancelled the invasion following a peace treaty with Spain, it released the vessels it had engaged. Homeward bound, Lascelles was at Saugor again on 14 February 1798. She reached Simon's Bay on 19 June and St Helena on 5 August. She arrived back at The Downs on 17 October.

The EIC charged the British government some £8441 for demurrage for the 272 days delay to Lascelles's original voyage.

=== Later career ===
Her owners sold Lascelles in 1798 to A. Fleming, London, for service as a West Indiaman. Captain William Wallace acquired a letter of marque on 31 May 1799.

On 8 October 1799 the "Lascelles East India store ship" sailed from Plymouth for The Downs under escort by HMS Childers.

On 2 January 1801, Lloyd's List reported that, ”The Lascelles, late Wallace, from Surinam to London, is on shore at Surinam River.” Lascelles was refloated and continued her voyage. Later she sprang a leak while in sight of Martinique and she sailed there on 5 March.

== Fate ==
Her owners sold Lascelles in 1802 to the Admiralty for use as a storeship. Her registration was cancelled on 7 January 1807, demolition having been completed at Plymouth.
