= Etna-class corvette =

Class overview
- Name: Etna
- Operators: French Navy; Royal Navy
- In commission: 1795–1816
- Completed: 6
- Lost: 1
- Retired: 5

General characteristics
- Type: Corvette
- Displacement: 400 to 450 ton (French)
- Tons burthen: c.564 (bm) (Note: This is based on the descriptions of the three members of the class that the Royal Navy captured, as described in Winfield.)
- Length: 35.95 m (117 ft 11 in) (overall); 32.48 m (106 ft 7 in) (keel)
- Beam: 9.74 m (31 ft 11 in)
- Draught: 5.12 m (16 ft 10 in)
- Propulsion: Sail
- Complement: 122–198
- Armament: Design: 16 × 18-pounder long gun + 1 × 12-inch mortar; Actual: 16 to 20 18-pounder long guns
- Armour: Timber

The Etna class was a class of six 16 or 18-gun corvettes with a flat hull, designed by Pierre-Alexandre-Laurent Forfait and his pupil Charles-Henri Tellier. Four separate commercial shipbuilders were involved in their construction by contract - including André-François Normand, Courtois and Denise at Honfleur, and Fouache at Le Havre (two ships), while the sixth vessel was built by Pierre Ozanne at Cherbourg Dockyard. The vessels were flush-decked and originally designed to carry a 12-inch mortar. However, as the British navy captured Etna within a year and a half of her launch at which time she was not carrying any mortar, it is possible that the design was modified quite early to delete the mortar.

The Royal Navy captured three of the six vessels in the class. Three members of the class (including two in Royal Navy service), were lost to wrecking or grounding. Only one of the corvettes served for over 20 years.

== Etna class (6 ships) ==
- Etna

Builder: André François and Joseph-Augustin Normand, Honfleur
Begun: June 1794
Launched: April 1795
Completed: May 1795
Fate: Captured by HMS Melampus on 13 November 1796. Commissioned in the Royal Navy as HMS Aetna and later renamed HMS Cormorant. Wrecked off Egypt in May 1800.

- Cérès

Builder: Jean Fouache, Le Havre
Begun: May 1794
Launched: May 1795
Completed: July 1795
Fate: Wrecked on the shores of Norway on 17 February 1798
Notes: Renamed from Courageuse in May 1795; may have been renamed in 1797 to Engant de la Patrie

- Vésuve

Builder: Denise, Honfleur
Begun: June 1794
Launched: 7 August 1795
Completed: October 1795
Fate: Broken up in Rochefort August/September 1830
Notes: Fitted as a flûte between November 1802 and June 1803; refitted at Le Havre in February 1807 and reclassified as a 20-gun corvette; on 31 October 1815 her use as a headquarters hulk in place of Serpente was approved.

- Étonnante

Builder: Fouache & Reine, Honfleur
Begun: June 1796
Launched: 27 August 1795
Completed: November 1796
Fate: Hulked in Brest in 1806

- Mignonne

Builder: Cherbourg Dockyard; constructeurs: Pierre Ozanne and after March 1795 Jean-François Lafosse
Begun: 6 October 1794
Launched: 15 October 1795
Completed: April 1797
Fate: HMS Goliath captured Mignonne in June 1803 in the West Indies. Though the Royal Navy never commissioned her, she did serve briefly before she grounded in December 1804 and was condemned.

- Torche

Builder: Courtois, Honfleur
Begun: June 1794
Launched: April 1795
Completed: May 1795
Fate: Captured in August 1805 by HMS Goliath and incorporated in the Royal Navy as HMS Torch. She was never commissioned and was broken up in 1811.
