= HMS Renown (1798) =

Ship of the line of the Royal Navy

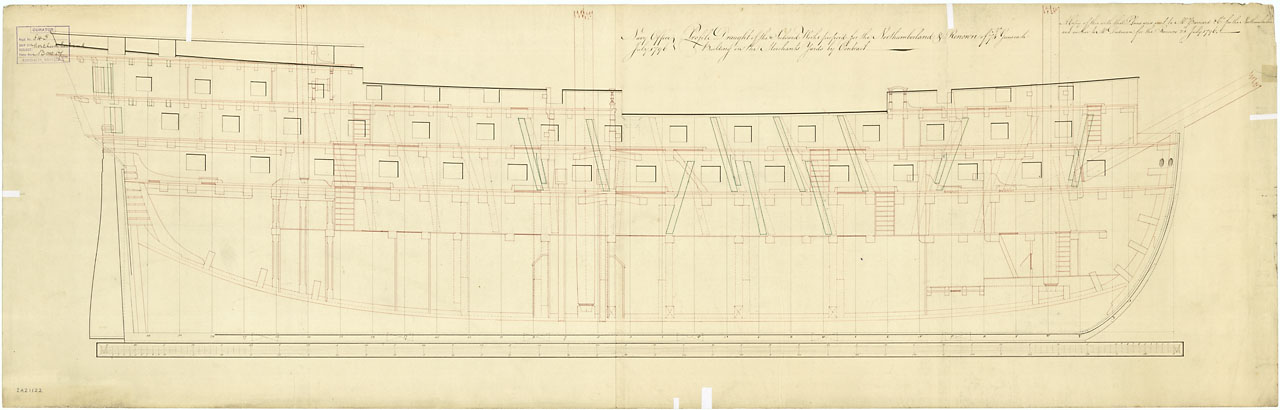
- HMS Renown (1798) image

History

United Kingdom
- Name: HMS Renown
- Ordered: 10 June 1795
- Builder: Dudman, Deptford Wharf
- Laid down: November 1796
- Launched: 2 May 1798
- Renamed: HMS Royal Oak, 1814
- Honours and awards: Naval General Service Medal with clasp "Egypt"
- Fate: Broken up, May 1835
- Notes: Harbour service from 1814

General characteristics
- Class & type: America-class ship of the line
- Tons burthen: 1899 (bm)
- Length: 182 ft (55 m) (gundeck)
- Beam: 48 ft 7 1/2 in (14.8 m)
- Depth of hold: 21 ft 7 in (6.58 m)
- Sail plan: Full-rigged ship
- Armament: Gundeck: 28 × 32-pounder guns; Upper gundeck: 30 × 18-pounder guns; QD: 12 × 9-pounder guns; Fc: 4 × 9-pounder guns

HMS Renown was a 74-gun third-rate ship of the line of the Royal Navy. She was to have been named HMS Royal Oak, but the name was changed to Renown on 15 February 1796. She was launched at Deptford Wharf on 2 May 1798 and served in 1800-1801 as the flagship of Sir John Borlase Warren, initially in the English Channel.

== Service history ==
On 1 July 1800, Renown, Fisgard and Defence, with the hired armed cutter Lord Nelson in company, were in Bourneuf Bay when they sent in their boats to attack a French convoy at Île de Noirmoutier. The British destroyed the French ship Therese (of 20 guns), a lugger (12 guns), two schooners (6 guns each) and a cutter (6 guns), of unknown names. The cutting out party also burned some 15 merchant vessels loaded with corn and supplies for the French fleet at Brest. However, in this enterprise, 92 officers and men out of the entire party of 192 men, fell prisoners to the French when their boats became stranded. Lord Nelson had contributed no men to the attacking force and so had no casualties. (Note: She did share in the head money with seaman receiving 3s 11¾d, and her commander receiving £85 15s 1d, in 1825.)

Next, Renown participated in an abortive invasion of Ferrol. On 29 August, in Vigo Bay, Admiral Sir Samuel Hood assembled a cutting-out party from the vessels under his command consisting of two boats each from Amethyst, Stag, Amelia, Brilliant and Cynthia, four boats from Courageaux, as well as the boats from Renown, London and Impetueux. The party went in and after a 15-minute fight captured the French privateer Guêpe, of Bordeaux and towed her out. She was of 300 tons burthen and had a flush deck. Pierced for 20 guns, she carried eighteen 9-pounders, and she and her crew of 161 men were under the command of Citizen Dupan. In the attack she lost 25 men killed, including Dupan, and 40 wounded. British casualties amounted to four killed, 23 wounded and one missing. (Note: A first-class share of the prize money was worth £42 19s 6½d; a fifth-class share, that of a seaman, was worth 1s 9½d.) In 1847 the Admiralty awarded the Naval General Service Medal with clasp "29 Aug. Boat Service 1800" to all surviving claimants from the action.

She then served at the abortive attack on Cádiz.

Armed en flute, she transferred to the Mediterranean in 1801, still as Warren's flagship. During this time Charles John Napier, the future admiral, was a midshipman in her. Because Renown served in the navy's Egyptian campaign (8 March to 2 September 1801), her officers and crew qualified for the clasp "Egypt" to the Naval General Service Medal that the Admiralty issued in 1847 to all surviving claimants.

In 1803 she was at Malta. 6 December 1804 she was at Naples, Italy and in 1805 was under repair at Plymouth. After a further spell in the Channel Fleet (1807–1808), she transferred again to the Mediterranean.

In 1809, she took part in the Battle of Maguelone.

== Fate ==
Renown was laid up at Plymouth in 1811 and hulked in 1814. She was broken up in May 1835.

== Renown in fiction ==
In the Horatio Hornblower novels of C. S. Forester, a ship of the line named the Renown (unrelated to the historical Renown of this period), is featured in the novel Lieutenant Hornblower. In the story, the ship's mad captain is injured after falling through a hatch in mysterious circumstances, and the junior officers must take over on adventures in the West Indies. In Hornblower (TV series) this story was related in the fifth and sixth episodes, Mutiny and Retribution.
