= Enseigne de vaisseau non entretenu =

French naval rank

Enseigne de vaisseau non entretenu (literally: "unmaintained ship-of-the-line ensign") was a junior officer rank in the French Navy during the French Revolutionary Wars. The duties of an enseigne de vaisseau non entretenu were the same as those of an enseigne de vaisseau entretenu ("maintained ship-of-the-line ensign"), but on a contractual basis rather than a full commission. An enseigne de vaisseau non entretenu would wear the uniform and have authority only when on service, and was not paid when off-duty.

There was a fixed number (200) of positions for "entretenus", which required a competitive examination. The number "non entretenus" had no such limit, and one could obtain the status by a simple examination or by captaining a merchantman. This allowed the Navy to augment its ranks at a time of crisis and as the personnel of the Navy was thin and disorganised by emigration and purges.
