= HMS Melampus (1785) =

Fifth-rate frigate of the Royal Navy

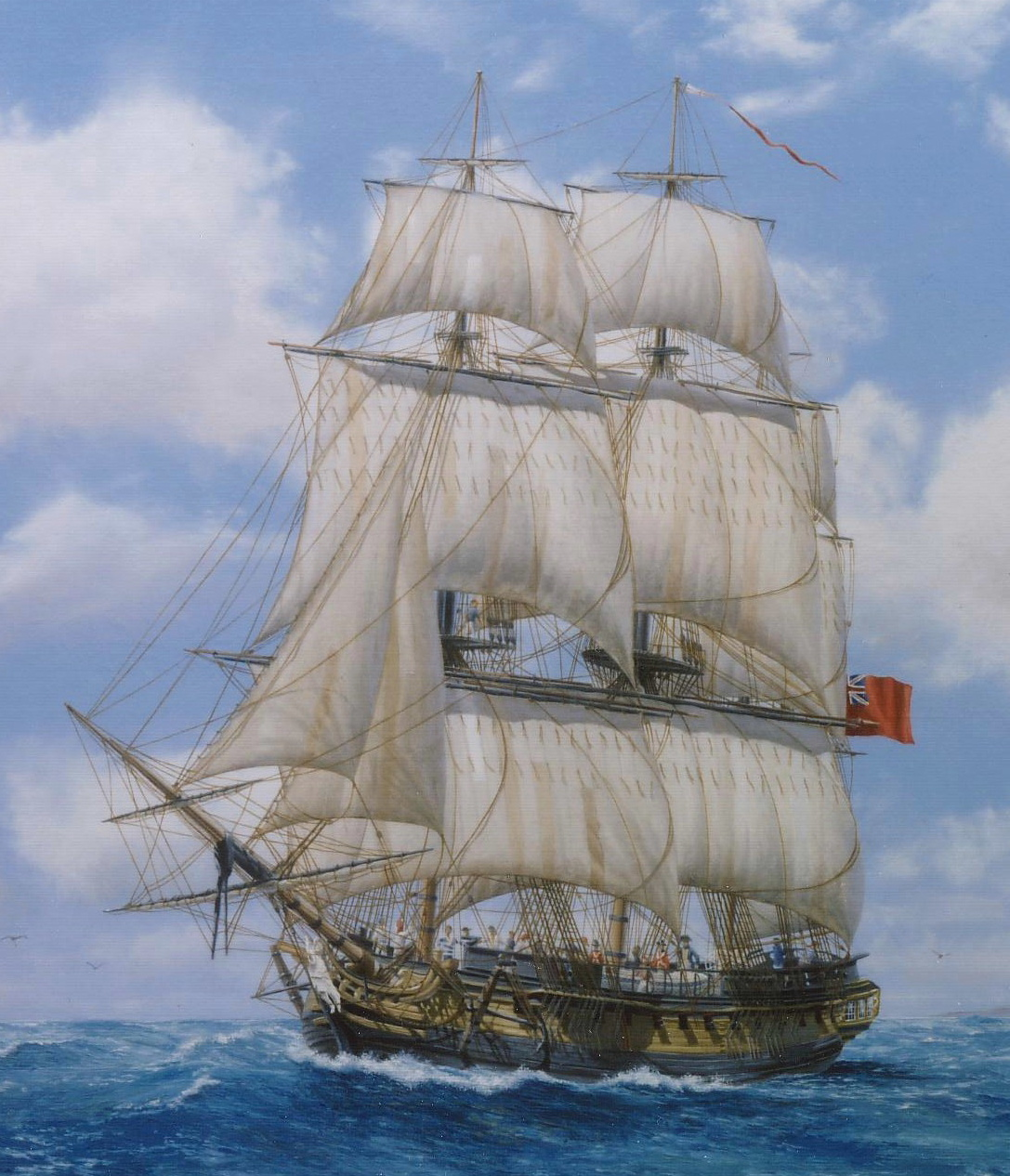
- Painting of Melampus

History

Great Britain
- Name: HMS Melampus
- Ordered: 17 April 1782
- Builder: James Martin Hillhouse, Bristol
- Laid down: December 1782
- Launched: 8 June 1785
- Honours and awards: Naval General Service Medal with clasps: "12 Octr. 1798"; "Guadaloupe"
- Fate: Sold to the Royal Netherlands Navy in June 1815

Netherlands
- Name: HNLMS Melampus
- Acquired: June 1815 by purchase

General characteristics
- Class & type: 36-gun fifth-rate frigate
- Tons burthen: 94724/94 (bm)
- Length: 141 ft (43.0 m)
- Beam: 38 ft 10 in (11.8 m)
- Draught: 13 ft 11 in (4.2 m)
- Sail plan: Full-rigged ship
- Complement: 270
- Armament: Upper deck: 26 × 18-pounder guns; QD: 8 × 9-pounder guns + 4 × 18-pounder carronades (replaced by 32-pounder carronades in June 1793); Fc: 2 × 9-pounder guns + 4 × 18-pounder carronades (planned but never fitted)

HMS Melampus was a 36-gun fifth-rate frigate of the Royal Navy which served in the French Revolutionary and Napoleonic Wars. She captured numerous prizes before the British sold her to the Royal Netherlands Navy in 1815, which commissioned her as HNLMS Melampus. In Dutch service, she participated in the bombardment of Algiers in 1816 and subsequently in a number of punitive expeditions in the Dutch East Indies.

== Design and construction ==
The Admiralty ordered Melampus from James Martin Hillhouse, of Bristol on 17 April 1782 as a 38-gun fifth rate. After she had been laid down in December 1782, the Admiralty reduced her armament to 36 guns on 11 January 1783, as captains of earlier 38-gun frigates had complained that the extra guns made the upper gundeck too cramped. Melampus was launched on 8 June 1785, and fitted between 3 July and 8 September 1785 for ordinary at Plymouth. She was again fitted between May and 2 July 1790 for Channel service. She had cost £20,785 13s 0d to build, with a further £2,985 being spent in 1790 for fitting out.

== Early service ==
Her first captain following her May 1790 commissioning was Charles M. Pole. Melampus was paid off again in November 1790, but by 1793 she had been moved to Plymouth, where she was refitted between March and June for £4,726.

== French Revolutionary Wars ==
She recommissioned in April 1793 under the command of Isaac Coffin, and by April the following year she was under Captain Thomas Wells, serving in Sir John Borlase Warren's squadron. During this time Melampus participated in the action of 23 April 1794, during which the British took three vessels, Engageante, Pomone, and Babet. Melampus had five men killed and five wounded.

She came under the command of Sir Richard Strachan in September 1794 and was recommissioned in April 1795. She was part of Strachan's force that attacked and destroyed a French convoy in Cartaret Bay on 9 May 1795. The British squadron spotted a convoy of 13 vessels and immediately gave chase. Twelve of the quarry escaped and got close to the shore where a small shore battery, their own armed escorts, and a brig and a lugger offered some protection. Strachan sent in the boats from the vessels in his squadron while Melampus and the ships provided covering fire. The French crews abandoned their vessels at the approach of the British and eventually the shore battery also stopped firing. The cutting out party retrieved all the vessels, save a small sloop, which was hard ashore and which they burnt. Melampus had eight men wounded and in all the British lost one man killed and 14 wounded. They captured a gun brig and a gun lugger, each armed with three 18-pounder guns. They also captured the convoy, which consisted of: Prosperitte (80 tons and carrying cordage), Montagne (200 tons and carrying timber, lead and tin plates), Catharine (200 tons and carrying ship timber), Hyrondelle (220 tons and carrying ship timber and pitch), Contente (250 tons, carrying powder), Nymphe (120 tons carrying fire wood), Bonne-Union (150 tons), Fantazie (45 tons carrying coals), Alexandre (397 and carrying ship timber, cordage, hemp and cannon), and Petit Neptune (113 tons and carrying ship timber). A later prize money report added the names of the escorts, the gun-brig Crachefeu and the gun-lugger Eclair, both of which the Royal Navy took into service under their existing names.

On 3 July 1795 Melampus and Hebe intercepted a convoy of 13 vessels off St Malo. Melampus captured an armed brig and Hebe captured six merchant vessels: Maria Louisa, Abeille. Bon Foi, Patrouille, Eleonore, and Pecheur. The brig of war was armed with four 24-pounders and had a crew of 60 men. Later she was identified as the 4-gun Vésuve. The convoy had been on its way from Île-de-Bréhat to Brest. Seaflower, Daphne and the cutter Sprightly shared in the prize and head money. The Royal Navy took Vésuve into service as HMS Vesuve.

Melampus came under the command of Captain Graham Moore in August 1796. On 13 November she and Minerva drove a French navy corvette ashore near Barfleur. However the British were not able to get close enough to assure her destruction. Then Melampus and Childers captured another corvette, the Etna. Etna was armed with eighteen 12-pounder guns and had a crew of 137 men under the command of Citizen Joseph La Coudrais. The prisoners stated that both corvettes were carrying military and naval stores and that the corvette that had run ashore was the Etonnant, of eighteen 18-pounder guns. Both were new ships on their first cruise. The Royal Navy took Etna into service as the 20-gun post ship HMS Cormorant.

Melampus was also active in operations against French privateers. On 5 October 1797 she captured the French privateer lugger Rayon off the Casquets after a chase of four hours. Rayon was armed with six carriage guns and eight coehorns, and had a crew of 54 men under the command of Jean Baptiste Leonard Gosselin. She had sailed from Cherburg ten hours earlier intending to cruise between the Lizard and Cape Clear for six weeks.

Melampus was in company with Seahorse when they captured the Belliqueux, off the Irish coast on 16 January 1798. She was originally a corvette, but was now a privateer. Belliqueux was pierced for 20 cannon but was armed with fourteen 8-pounder guns and four carronades, and had a crew of 120 men. She was out of St. Malo, and on 11 January had captured His Majesty's packet Prince Ernest, which had been sailing from Tortola. The captain of the packet and all but four of her crew were on board Belliqueux.

A few days later, on 23 January, Melampus captured the Volage, after a short, intense engagement. She was a corvette that the French navy had lent to merchants. She was armed with twenty 9-pounder guns and two 18-pounders, and had a crew of 195 men under the command of Citizen Delageneaux, a capitaine de frégate. In the engagement Melampus had two men mortally wounded and three men dangerously wounded; Volage had four men killed and eight wounded. Volage was three weeks out of Nantes, provisioned for a three-month cruise. By the time of her capture, Volage had herself only captured an American ship and destroyed an English brig sailing from Belfast to Lisbon with coal. The Captain and all the officers on Volage were officers in the French navy, but on a three-month leave.

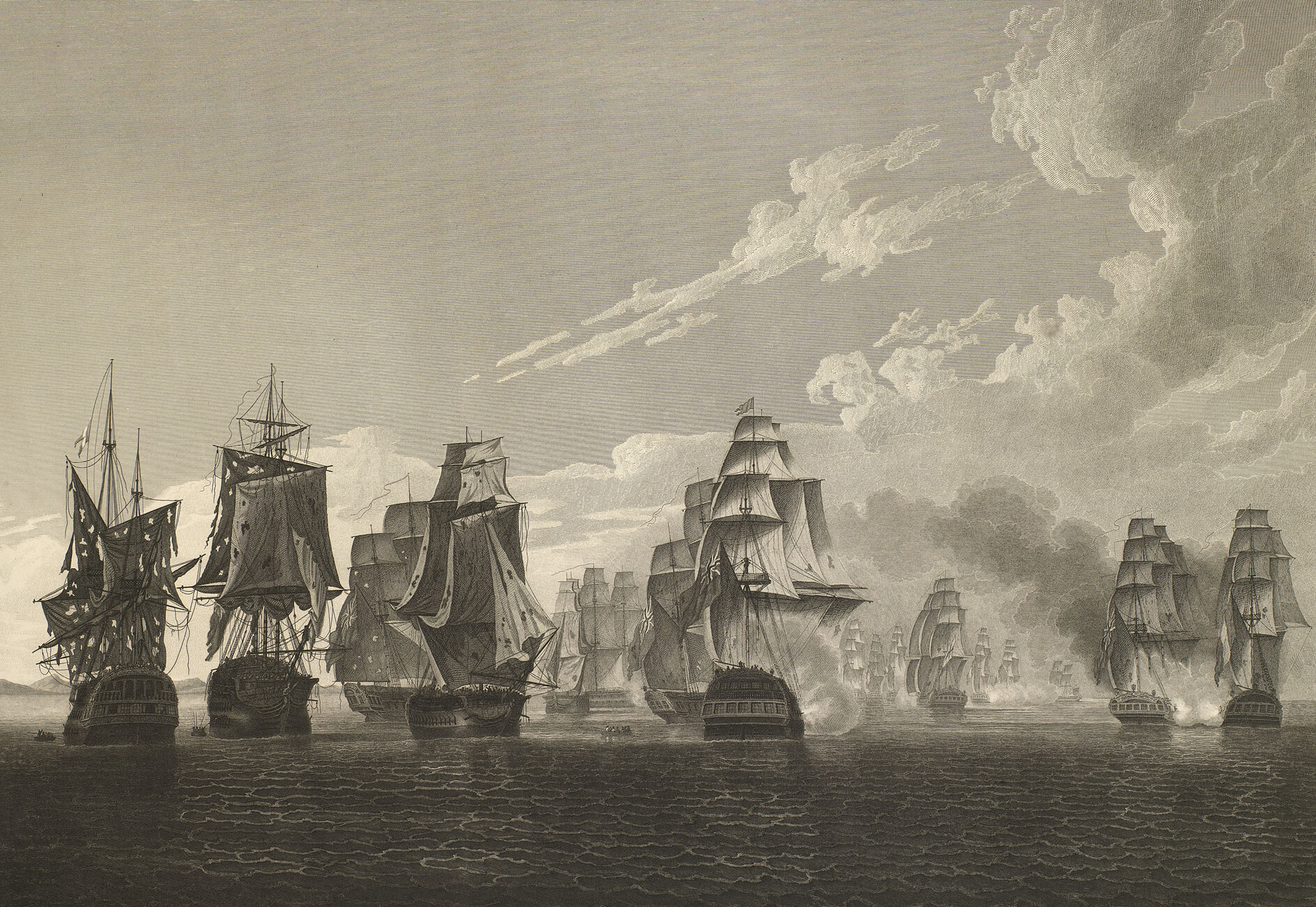
Melampus at the Battle of Tory Island

Melampus was present at the Battle of Tory Island in October that year, fighting in the main action and then subsequently capturing the Résolue in a night action two days later. Together with Ethalion she captured the 32-gun frigate Bellone which the Royal Navy took into service as HMS Proserpine. On 26 February 1799 Melampus captured the French privateer Mercure, which the Admiralty took into service as Trompeuse. Mercure was armed with 16 guns and had a crew of 103 men. She was from Saint Malo and was returning to her home port after having had a successful cruise in the Channel. She was under the command of Captain Jacques Dupuy-Fromy.

On 14 April Melampus pursued another French privateer for 25 hours before she was able to capture her quarry. The privateer was the brig Papillon, which was armed with ten 9-pounder guns and four 36-pounder obusiers and had a crew of 123 men.

On 18 April Melampus was in pursuit of a privateer when the privateer capsized and sank before Melampus could reach her. The captain of Papillon stated that the privateer was the Nantois, of fourteen 6 and 12-pounder guns, and a crew of 150 men. Furthermore, she had on board the master and part of the crew of the brig Echo, which she had captured earlier.

Melampus was then assigned to the Caribbean, sailing for Jamaica in March 1800. On 2 June, Melampus, in company with Juno, captured the French letter of marque Volant, of 140 tons, armed with eight guns, and having a crew of 49 men. She was sailing from Vera Cruz to the Havannah. (Note: Head money was paid in 1829. A first-class share was worth £34 13s 3d; a fifth-class share, that of a seaman, was worth 2s 2½d.) Melampus also captured Hannibal on 23 July. (Note: Head money for both was paid in 1829. A first-class share was worth £43 5 3d; a fifth-class share, that of a seaman, was worth 2s 5d.)

On 1 October Melampus, Juno, and Retribution were in company when they captured the Aquila. (Note: Head money was paid in 1829. A first-class share was worth £33 18s 3½d; a fifth-class share, that of a seaman, was worth 2s 4¼d.) Thereafter she came under the command of Captain Thomas Le Marchant Gosselin in November 1801 before being paid off in June 1802.

Lastly, Melampus captured Amistad (29 December) and Falcon Corunnes (30 December). (Note: Head money for both was paid in 1829. A first-class share was worth £150 14s 5¼d; a fifth-class share, that of a seaman, was worth 6s 4½d.)

== Napoleonic Wars ==
Melampus returned to England, and underwent a large repair at Deptford between August 1803 and October 1804. She was recommissioned in August 1804 under the command of Captain Stephen Poyntz, and commenced cruises off the French coast.

Between 12 and 14 February 1805, Melampus was in company with cutter Nimble, and the hired armed cutters Frisk and Rhoda. At this time 27 French gunvessels were sailing from Bordeaux to Brest. Melampus succeeded in capturing two gunbrigs carrying two 24-pounder guns and one 18-pounder gun each, with a complement of 50 men each, primarily soldiers. Melampus also captured four luggers, each armed with one 18-pounder gun, and with complements of 25 men, mostly soldiers. The gunvessels Melampus captured were N°s 169, 174, 277, 286, 287, and 311. (Note: The share of the prize money accruing to an able seaman on Melampus, Nimble, Frisk, or Rhoda was £1 9s 7d.) Frisk succeeded in capturing Gunvessel n° 288, armed with one 24-pounder gun, and with a complement of 25 men (20 being troops from the 44th Regiment), all under the command of enseigne de vaisseaux P. Roox. Rhoda succeeded in capturing the lugger Gunvessel n °313, armed with one 24-pounder gun, and with a complement of 22 men (18 of them soldiers), under the command of enseigne auxiliaire Frederick Widsmann. The gunvessel had had one man killed.

On 25 June Loire had been chasing a French frigate privateer for some twelve hours when Melampus and Brilliant came up and cut-off the quarry, forcing her to surrender. She was the Valiant (or Vaillant, of Bordeaux. She was armed with twenty-four 18-pounder guns on her main deck and six 6-pounders, which she threw overboard while Loire was pursuing her. She had a crew of 240 men. She had been out for 20 days on a four-month cruise but had only captured the Halifax packet Lord Charles Spencer.

On 13 July 1805 she captured the Spanish privateer Hydra at sea. Hydra was pierced for 30 cannons and carried twenty-two 9-pounder guns on her main deck, and six 6-pounders on her quarterdeck. She had a crew of 192 men, and she lost three men killed and several men wounded before she struck. Melampus captured her on the 17th day of a four-month cruise and she had not yet captured any British vessels.

One week later Melampus recaptured Barzilla, which the French privateer General Perignon had captured about a week earlier. Melampus shared the salvage money with HMS Neptune.

Melampus was present, whilst serving as part of a squadron under her old commander Sir Richard Strachan, at the destruction of the 74-gun Impétueux on 14 September 1806.

In September 1807 Captain Edward Hawker took over command, sailing her to North America in 1808. He then took her to the Leeward Islands in 1809.

On 16 January 1809 Melampus captured the French navy brig Colibri off Barbuda, after her captain had the "temerity" to put up a fight as Melampus was sailing alongside. She was armed with fourteen 24-pounder carronades and two 8-pounder guns, had a crew of 92 men, under the command of Mons. Deslandes, Lieutenant de vaisseau. In the engagement, Colibri had three men killed and 11 wounded before she struck. She was a new vessel and was sailing from Cherburg with a cargo of 570 barrels of flour and a great quantity of gunpowder intended for the relief of to San Domingo. On her way she had captured and sunk two British brigs that had been sailing from Newfoundland to Lisbon, the Hannibal and the Priscilla, both of Dartmouth. The Royal Navy took her into service as Colibri.

On 14 December Melampus captured the French brig corvette Bearnais after pursuing her for 28 hours. Bearnais was armed with sixteen 24-pounder carronades and had a crew of 109 men (including 30 soldiers), under the command of Monsieur Montbazen, Lieutenant de vaisseau. She fought before striking with the result that she had one man killed and some men wounded, and she wounded two men on Melampus. Bearnais was a new vessel and was sailing from Bayonne to Guadeloupe with a cargo of flour and military stores, some of which she had thrown overboard during the pursuit. The Royal Navy took her into service as Curieux.

Between January and February 1810, Melampus was involved in the capture of Guadeloupe. In 1847 the Admiralty awarded the Naval General Service Medal with clasp "Guadaloupe" to all surviving claimants from the campaign.

Melampus was in company with the sloop Driver when they captured a French corvette brig letter of marque on 28 May. The vessel was the Fantôme, of 300 tons burthen (bm), pierced for 20 heavy carronades, and with a crew of 74 men. She had made three captures before being captured herself. The Royal Navy took her into service under her existing name.

== Transfer ==
Melampus returned to Britain, and by December 1812 was under repair at Isaac Blackburn's yards, at Turnchapel. Work was completed by March 1814, and she was again fitted for sea, between April 1814 and May 1815 at Plymouth Dockyard. She was then sold to the Dutch government in June 1815 for the sum of £35,364.

== HNLMS Melampus ==
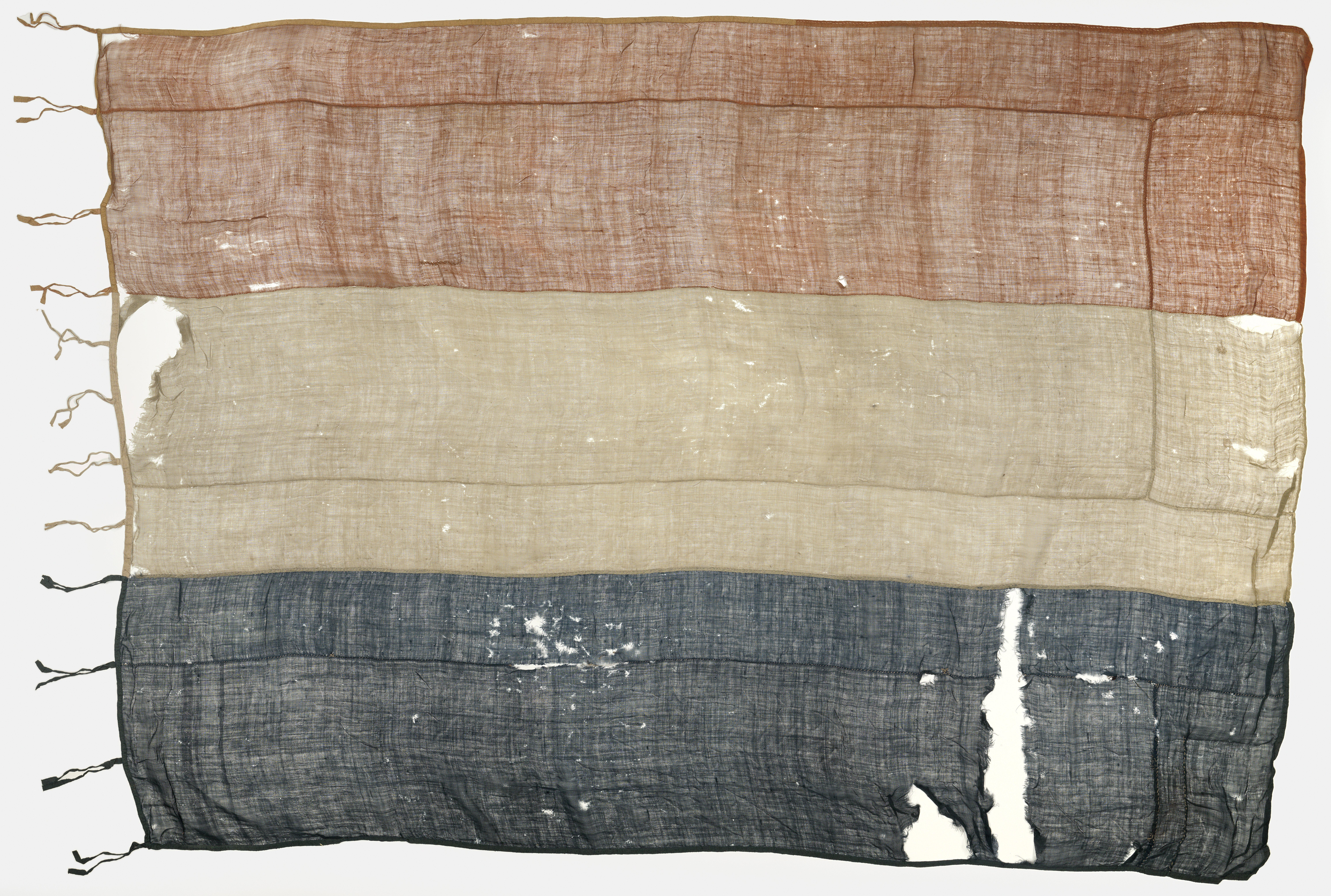
Melampus's ensign at the bombardment of Algiers

On 27 August 1816 Melampus was the flagship of the Dutch squadron under Vice-admiral Theodorus Frederik van Capellen that joined a British fleet under Admiral Lord Exmouth in the bombardment of Algiers. Her captain was Anton Willem de Man. In the action Melampus lost three men killed and 15 wounded. By 1822 Melampus was in the Dutch East Indies. In that year she led a squadron of five transports and 24 local vessels carrying Dutch marines and native auxiliaries in a punitive expedition against the Iranun of Sulawesi.
