= French corvette Départment des Landes (1804) =

French navy warship

Départment des Landes
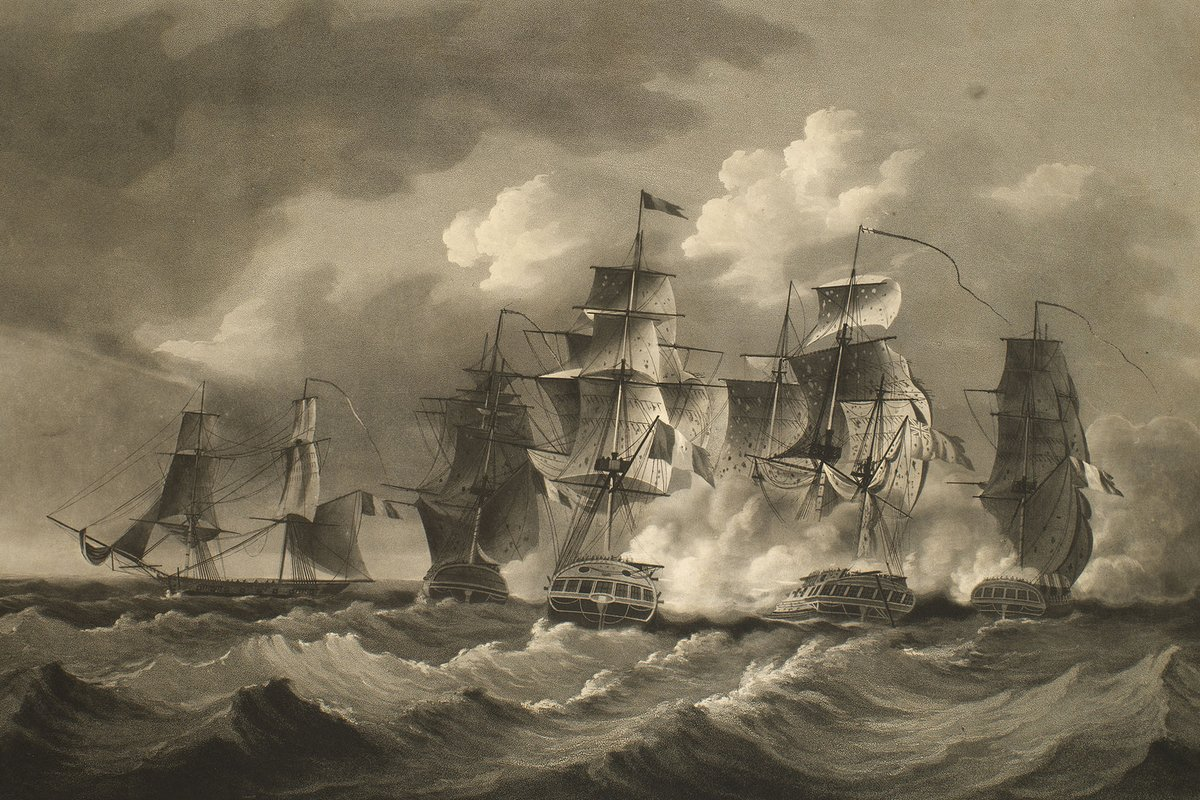
- Action off Porto Rico on 19 July 1805: Topaze, Départment des Landes, Torche and Faune destroy HMS Blanche.

History

France
- Name: Départment des Landes
- Ordered: 21 February 1803
- Builder: Bayonne (Constructeur: Jean Baudrey)
- Laid down: May 1803
- Launched: 19 July 1804
- Commissioned: 10 December 1804
- Decommissioned: 30 November 1814
- Stricken: 1820
- Fate: Broken up 1829-30.

General characteristics
- Displacement: 760 tons (French)
- Length: 39.25 m (128.8 ft) (overall)
- Beam: 9.79 m (32.1 ft)
- Depth of hold: 5.00 m (16.40 ft)
- Complement: 157-189
- Armament: Originally: 20 × 8-pounder long guns; 1805: Upper deck: 16 × 24-pounder carronades + 4 × 12-pounder guns; Galliards: 2 × 8-pounder guns + 4 × 6-pounder guns; 1814:12-pounder carronades replaced the 12-pounder guns

Départment des Landes was a corvette of the French Navy, launched in 1804. She was damaged in 1814 and subsequently decommissioned. She was finally broken up around 1829-30.

== Origins ==
Départment des Landes was built to a design by Pierre Rolland (cadet). The Ministry of Marine originally ordered her on 21 February 1803 under the name Égérie. However, on 13 August the Département des Landes offered to give the government a corvette. The Ministry ordered a corvette that day at Bayonne, but on 20 January 1804 cancelled the order. Instead, the Department took responsibility for the payment to complete Égérie, and the corvette was named for the Department.

== Career ==
On 19 July 1805 Départment des Landes was part of a squadron of four vessels under François-André Baudin that captured HMS Blanche off Puerto Rico, three days after they had left Martinique. The other three were the 40-gun French frigate Topaze, the 18-gun corvette Torche, and the 16-gun Faune.

On 14 August, the 74-gun, third rate Goliath was in the Channel Fleet when she saw a sail to eastward and three sail to westward. The lone sail was Faune, which trailed behind her squadron and had lost contact with it. Goliath sailed east, meeting up with HMS Camilla and assisting her in chasing and capturing Faune, which struck when the much more powerful Goliath came in range.

The three remaining ships proceeded, but on the 16th, Torche was lagging behind and in danger of being caught by Goliath, which had been joined by HMS Raisonnable. Deeming that waiting for Torche entailed accepting battle against the overwhelming British forces, Baudin ordered his squadron to take whatever actions were necessary for their security. Goliath caught up with Torche, which struck after a few shots from Goliath. Topaze and Départment-des-Landes escaped.

On 29 September Départment des Landes, under the command of Captain Joseph-François Raoul, was sailing off Guadeloupe when she encountered HMS Maria, a gun-brig of 16 guns. (Note: The report in the London Gazette states that Départment des Landes carried 22 guns (sixteen 24-pounder carronades, four 12-pounder guns, and two 9-pounder guns on the quarterdeck), plus a large swivel on the forecastle. James says sixteen 24-pounder carronades and four long 8-pounders on the main deck, two brass 6-pounders on the quarterdeck, plus a large swivel on the forecastle.) (Note: Joseph Dyason, Maria's master, gave the French vessel's name as Sards, which perhaps was a nickname.)

Unable to maneuver, Maria took two broadsides. The French called on Lieutenant James Bennett, Maria's captain, to surrender. He refused and three grapeshot from the next broadside killed him. The master, Joseph Dyason, then continued the combat but eventually had to strike. Maria had suffered six men killed, including Bennett, and nine wounded. The French had suffered at most a couple of men wounded. After the French had gotten all their prisoners off Maria, the prize crew had to run her aground to prevent her from sinking due to the damage she had sustained. The French provided a cartel to Dominica to permit Dyason to report the loss to Rear-Admiral Alexander Cochrane. The French later refloated Maria and she was taken into the French Navy under her existing name.

== Fate ==
Départment des Landes was entering Brest on 13 September 1814 when she struck a rock. She was refloated but did not sail again. The French Navy decommissioned her on 30 November. She was condemned at Brest in 1820 and removed from the list of active warships. The Ministry of Marine ordered her broken up on 29 October 1829. She was subsequently broken up between December 1829 and February 1830.
