= French corvette Torche (1795) =

French naval Etna-class ship-sloop

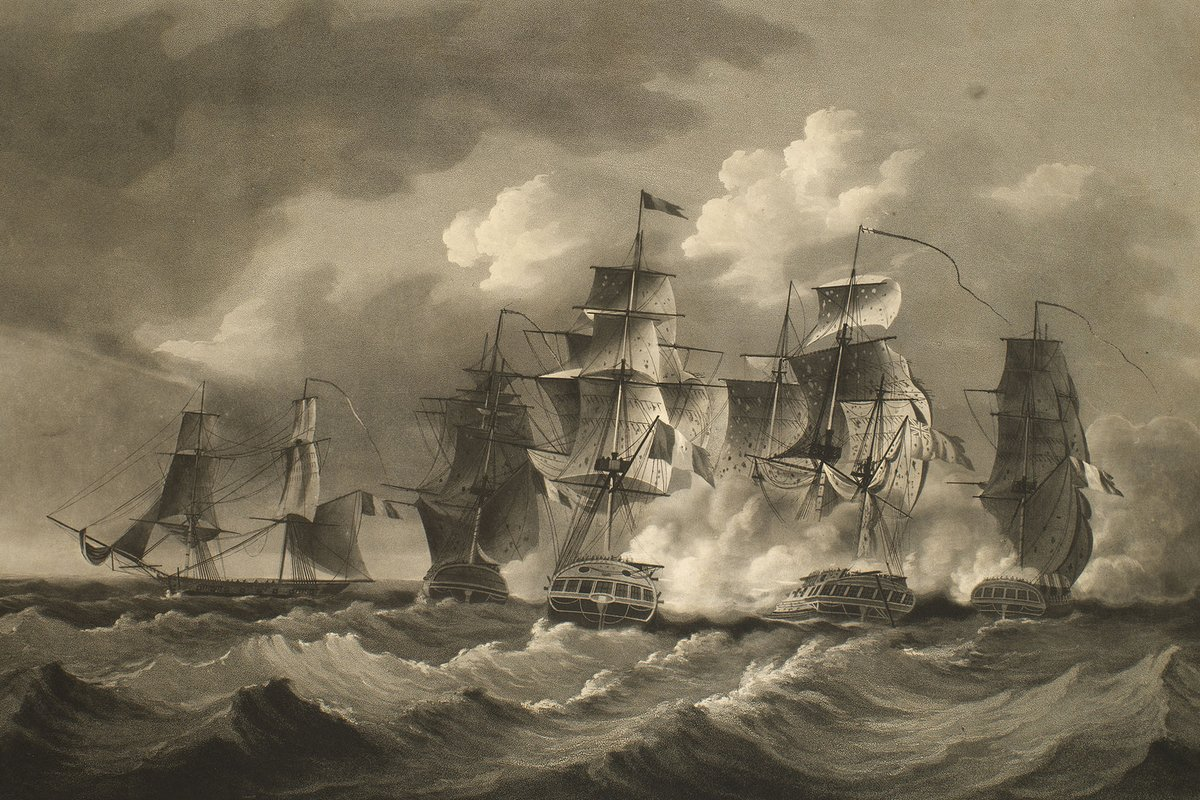
- Action off Porto Rico on 19 July 1805: Topaze, Départment des Landes, Torche and Faune destroy HMS Blanche.

History

France
- Name: Torche
- Builder: Honfleur
- Laid down: June 1794
- Launched: April 1795
- Captured: August 1805

United Kingdom
- Name: HMS Torch
- Acquired: August 1805 by capture
- Fate: Broken up 1811

General characteristics
- Tons burthen: 55676/94 (bm)
- Length: Overall: 118 ft (36.0 m)
- Beam: 32 ft 9 1/2 in (10.0 m)
- Depth of hold: 10 ft (3.0 m)
- Propulsion: Sails
- Complement: 121 (British establishment)
- Armament: French service: 18 × 18-pounder long guns; British establishment: 18 × 32-pounder carronades + 2 × 12-pounder bow chasers

Torche was a French naval Etna-class ship-sloop launched in 1795. She participated in the action of 19 July 1805, with the Royal Navy capturing her one-month later, in August. She was taken into service as HMS Torch but never commissioned and was broken up in 1811.

== Career and capture ==
From 2 June 1795, Torche served at Honfleur under Lieutenant Péronne.

On 9 February 1803, Torche, under Lieutenant Dehen the elder, departed Camaret, bound to Le Havre and Dunkirk. From there, she ferried troops to Santo Domingo, and transported general Pierre Quantin on her journey back to Cadiz, where she arrived on 27 November 1803.

On 19 July 1805 Torche, which was under the command of lieutenant Nicolas-Philippe Dehen, was part of a squadron of four vessels under François-André Baudin, that three days after they had left Martinique captured HMS Blanche off Puerto Rico. Torche's companions were the 40-gun French frigate Topaze, the 22-gun corvette Départment des Landes, and the 16-gun brig Faune.

On 14 August, the 74-gun, third rate Goliath was in the Channel Fleet when she saw a sail to eastward and three sail to westward. The lone sail was Faune, which trailed behind her squadron and had lost contact with it. Goliath sailed east, meeting up with HMS Camilla and assisting her in chasing and capturing Faune, which struck when the much more powerful Goliath came in range. Faune had on board as prisoners 22 men from Blanche.

The three remaining ships proceeded, but on the 16th, Torche was lagging behind and in danger of behind caught by Goliath, which had been joined by HMS Raisonnable. Deeming that waiting for Torche entailed accepting battle against the overwhelming British forces, Baudin ordered his squadron to take whatever actions were necessary for their security; this allowed Topaze and Départment des Landes to escape. Goliath caught up with Torche, which struck after a few shots from Goliath. Torche was carrying 52 men from the crew of Blanche. However, Topaze and Départment-des-Landes escaped.

== Fate ==
The Royal Navy took Torche into service as HMS Torch. The Navy placed her in ordinary and there is no record of her ever being commissioned. She was broken up in 1811.
