= French ship Torride =

Two vessels named Torride have served the French Navy between 1786 and 1815:

- Torride was the merchant tartane Union that the French Navy acquired in 1794 and renamed Torride in May 1795. She was a chaloupe-canonnière (gun-shallop), that the French Navy used as an aviso. The Navy may have sold her in 1797 to the Bey of Tunis.
- Torride was the cutter Sally of unknown origin that the French Navy converted into a gun-vessel. The British Royal Navy captured her in 1798 at Abu Qir and she served as HMS Torride at the Siege of Acre. She is last listed in 1802.
