= HMS Blanche (1800) =

Royal Navy fifth-rate frigate

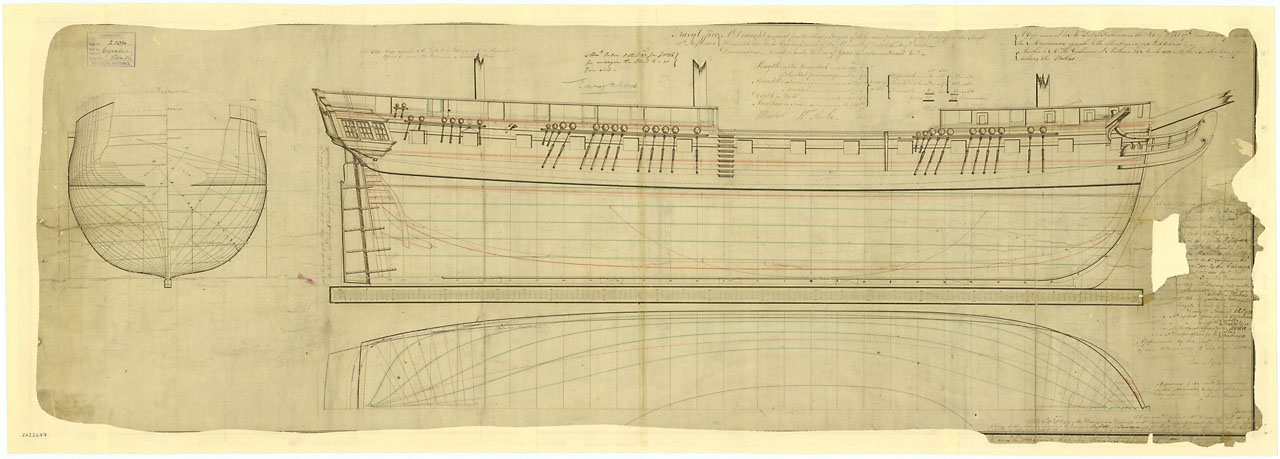
- 1803 plan of the Apollo class

History

United Kingdom
- Name: Blanche
- Ordered: 18 January 1799
- Builder: Deptford Dockyard
- Laid down: February 1800
- Launched: 2 October 1800
- Completed: 17 January 1801
- Commissioned: 19 November 1800
- Fate: Destroyed, 19 July 1805

General characteristics
- Class & type: Fifth-rate Apollo-class frigate
- Tons burthen: 95086/94 (bm)
- Length: 145 ft 1 in (44.2 m) (upper deck); 121 ft 9 1/2 in (37.1 m) (keel)
- Beam: 38 ft 3 3/4 in (11.7 m)
- Draught: 10 ft 5 in (3.2 m) (forward); 14 ft 1 in (4.3 m) (aft)
- Depth of hold: 13 ft 3 in (4 m)
- Propulsion: Sails
- Complement: 264
- Armament: UD: 26 × 18-pounder guns; QD: 2 × 9-pounder guns + 10 × 32-pounder carronades; Fc: 2 × 9-pounder guns + 4 × 32-pounder carronades

HMS Blanche was a 36-gun fifth-rate Apollo-class frigate of the Royal Navy. She was commissioned in 1800 by Captain Graham Hamond, under whom on 2 April 1801 Blanche fought as part of the frigate reserve at the Battle of Copenhagen. She spent the remainder of the French Revolutionary Wars serving in the English Channel. When the Napoleonic Wars began in 1803 Blanche was sent to serve in the West Indies under the command of Captain Zachary Mudge. There the frigate participated in the Blockade of Saint-Domingue and an unsuccessful invasion of Curacao, capturing upwards of twenty-four vessels.

Blanche was sailing off Puerto Rico on 19 July 1805 when she was attacked by a French squadron of four ships, led by Captain François-André Baudin in the 40-gun frigate Le Topaze. After a battle lasting forty-five minutes Mudge surrendered Blanche, having had eight men killed. The frigate was beginning to sink, and the French chose to destroy her, setting the ship on fire. Two of the four French warships were captured a month later, while Mudge was released after Topaze reached Portugal. Blanche's loss is controversial; while Rear-Admiral John Sutton praised Mudge and his crew for their defence of the outnumbered ship, historians such as William James have criticised the British performance as lacklustre and undistinguished.

== Design ==
Blanche was a 36-gun, 18-pounder Apollo-class frigate. Frigates were three-masted, full-rigged ships that carried their main battery on a single, continuous gun deck. They were smaller and faster than ships of the line and primarily intended for raiding, reconnaissance and messaging. Designed by Surveyor of the Navy Sir William Rule, the Apollo class originated as three ships constructed between 1798 and 1803. The class formed part of the Royal Navy's response to the French Revolutionary Wars and need for more warships to serve in it. The original Apollo design would be revived at the start of the Napoleonic Wars in 1803, with twenty-four ships ordered to it over the next nine years.

The Apollo class was chosen to fulfil the role of a standardised frigate type because of how well the lone surviving ship of the first batch, HMS Euryalus, had performed, providing "all-round excellence" according to the naval historian Robert Gardiner. Trials of ships of the class showed that they were all capable of reaching around 12 knots (22 km/h) and were very well balanced, although prone to pitching deeply in heavy seas. They also had a high storage capacity, allowing for upwards of six months' provisions.

== Construction ==
Blanche was the second of the three ships in the first Apollo batch, ordered on 18 January 1799. Alongside the name-ship of the class, HMS Apollo, her construction was contracted to John Dudman at Deptford Dockyard. Blanche was laid down in February 1800, and launched on 2 October with the following dimensions: 145 feet 1 inch (44.2 m) along the upper deck, 121 feet 9 1/2 inches (37.1 m) at the keel, with a beam of 38 feet 3 3/4 inches (11.7 m) and a depth in the hold of 13 feet 3 inches (4 m). The ship had a draught of 10 feet 5 inches (3.2 m) forward and 14 feet 1 inch (4.3 m) aft, and measured 95086/94 tons burthen. She was named after Blanche, a French 36-gun frigate captured by the Royal Navy in 1779 and commissioned as HMS Blanche before being lost in the Great Hurricane of 1780.

The fitting out process for Blanche was completed on 17 January 1801, also at Deptford. With a crew complement of 264, the frigate held twenty-six 18-pounder long guns on her upper deck. Complementing this armament were ten 32-pounder carronades and two 9-pounder long guns on the quarterdeck, with an additional two 9-pounder long guns and four 32-pounder carronades on the forecastle. Blanche's armament stayed as originally established throughout her service.

== Service ==
=== Copenhagen ===
Blanche was commissioned under the command of Captain Graham Hamond on 19 November 1800. After fitting out was completed in January the following year Blanche joined the Baltic Fleet at Yarmouth in preparation to sail to Copenhagen to harass Denmark, part of the Anti-British Second League of Armed Neutrality. On 19 March Blanche was sent ahead of the fleet to Elsinore, landing the member of parliament Nicholas Vansittart for a meeting with the British Minister to Denmark, William Drummond, so that they could outline the Foreign Secretary Lord Hawkesbury's ultimatum to the Danes. After two days negotiations failed and Blanche took Drummond and his suite on board, returning to the fleet anchored in Øresund on 22 March. Drummond and Vansittart explained that rather than acceding to the British terms, the Danes were strengthening their defences and planning to rebuff the British fleet. In preparation to make an attack on Copenhagen, on 27 March Blanche escorted two of the fleet's bomb ships to a position from which they would be able to bombard the fortress of Kronborg.

The Battle of Copenhagen

During the night of 1 April the frigate grounded off Amager. The crew spent the night re-floating and rectifying the vessel, and received no sleep prior to the start of the Battle of Copenhagen on 2 April. In engaging the Danish line of battle Blanche was part of a flotilla of five frigates under the command of Captain Edward Riou that were to act as a manoeuvrable reserve force. After beginning the battle by firing opportunistically in the gaps between the British ships of the line, at 11:30 a.m. Riou took the flotilla to form an arc at the northern-most point of the British line. For this Blanche was stationed between the 38-gun HMS Amazon and 32-gun HMS Alcmene. The frigates attacked the 64-gun ship of the line Holsteen and blockship Indfødsretten, while receiving heavy fire from the nearby Trekroner Fort and 16-gun defence frigate Hielperen.

The frigates withdrew after two hours, having received heavy casualties in the victorious battle. In the engagement Blanche received seven men killed and a further nine badly wounded, with damage to her hull and rigging. In the wake of the battle the commander of the British fleet, Admiral Sir Hyde Parker, agreed an armistice with the Danes that the First Lord of the Admiralty, Admiral Lord St Vincent, believed was too lenient, and he recalled Parker. On 5 May Parker left his flagship and went on board Blanche, reaching Yarmouth in the frigate on 13 May.

=== Channel Fleet ===
Blanche spent the rest of the French Revolutionary Wars attached to Admiral William Cornwallis' Channel Fleet patrolling the Bay of Biscay. Captain Barrington Dacres took command of the frigate at the Peace of Amiens in May 1802, serving as part of the Royal Escort to George III at Weymouth for much of the year, and patrolling off Cornwall and Devon combatting smugglers. Blanche was paid off on 22 September as part of a refit that had begun at Sheerness Dockyard in August. The naval historian Rif Winfield records Dacres as commanding Blanche to this stage, but the biographer William O'Byrne states that Hamond retained command until paying off. As the refit was approaching completion Captain Zachary Mudge recommissioned the ship in October, having joined on 23 September, and Blanche left the dockyard in January 1803.

=== West Indies ===
With the Peace of Amiens having ended with the start of the Napoleonic Wars, Blanche sailed to the West Indies where she joined the Blockade of Saint-Domingue towards the end of the year. On 3 November she discovered the French 4-gun privateer cutter L'Albion sheltering under the gun batteries of Monte Christi. Mudge sent four of Blanche's boats with sixty-three men to cut out Albion, but did so in broad daylight; before they could reach the French ship Blanche's boats turned back, believing the task too dangerous.

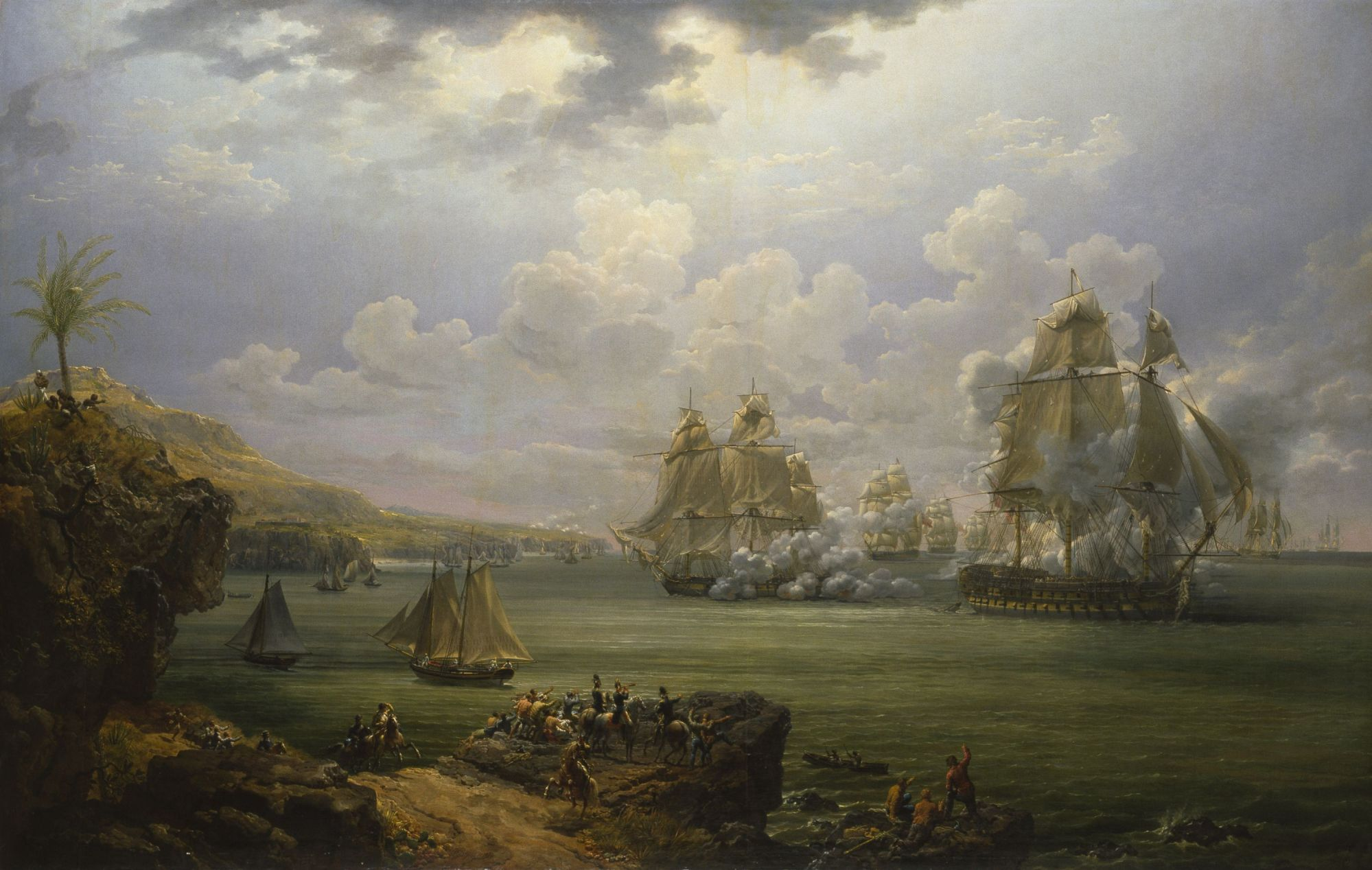
Scene from the Blockade of Saint-Domingue

Mudge decided to attack Albion again, this time during the night of 3–4 November. He sent the marine Lieutenant Edward Nicolls out in a boat with thirteen men to make the attack, but soon realised this was not enough and sent Lieutenant Warwick Lake with twenty-two men to reinforce and supersede Nicolls. The two boats approached Albion, but Lake believed the French vessel to be in a different location and took his boat off in the wrong direction, leaving Nicolls to make the attack alone. Nicolls boarded Albion and, despite being shot through the stomach, quickly captured the vessel, the British having killed five of the French crew.

With gun batteries overlooking the scene of the battle, Nicolls had his men keep firing their muskets to make it seem as if the battle was still ongoing, so that the batteries would not fire on the newly taken ship. As Nicolls was just getting Albion away from the shore Lake appeared in his boat and ordered the men to stop firing. "As a reward of his stupidity", the naval historian William Laird Clowes says, the gun batteries then killed two of his men before Albion sailed out of range. Mudge reported Lake rather than Nicolls as the victor of the battle, leading the contemporary naval historian William James to suggest Lake was a favourite of the captain's, despite Clowes describing him as "a thoroughly worthless officer". Mudge's operations were not always so confused, and in a one-month period off San Domingo he captured or destroyed twenty-four vessels, halting much of the communication between the blockaded islands.

In the morning after the capture of Albion one of Blanche's boats attacked and captured a 1-gun privateer schooner. About a day after this another of the frigate's boats, under the command of Midshipman Edward Henry à Court, was on a mission to gather sand with eight men and five muskets on board, when they encountered a French schooner with over thirty soldiers. À Court chose to board the schooner despite his numerical disadvantage, and successfully captured the vessel when the soldiers were found to all be seasick.

Under the orders of Captain John Bligh the frigate then joined in an attempt to capture Curacao. Bligh's force brought itself together off San Domingo on 15 January 1804, and reached Bonaire on 30 January. They reached the capital of Curacao, Willemstad, in the following day, and at 9:30 a.m. Bligh's demand for capitulation was refused. The main port of St Anne was heavily fortified, so Bligh landed a force of Royal Marines elsewhere on the coast, leaving Blanche and the 36-gun frigate HMS Pique to guard St Anne. (Note: Lieutenant William Braithwaite of Blanche was meant to command part of the invasion force but he was replaced after being found "incapacitated by his habitual drunkenness".) After initial success Bligh's invasion was dogged by sickness and high casualties from skirmishes, and on 25 February they reembarked having failed to take the island.

Continuing off Curacao, Blanche captured the French 14-gun privateer La Gracieuse on 21 October and at some point in the year also took the Dutch 4-gun schooner Nimrod. The ship captured two more French privateers in 1805; the 6-gun Le Hansard on 5 April and the 14-gun schooner L'Amitie on 9 April. (Note: O'Byrne describes Gracieuse and Amitie as naval ships rather than privateers.)

== Loss ==
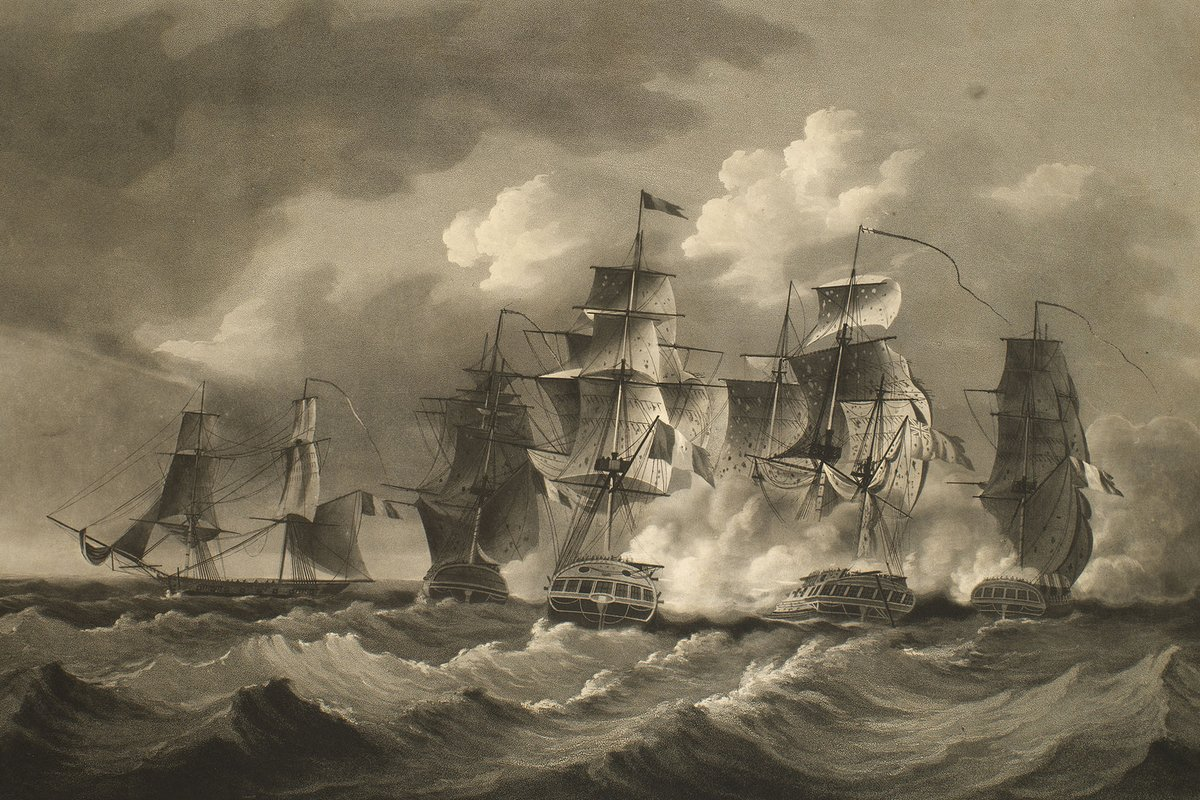
Blanche battles the French squadron on 19 July 1805

Blanche was sailing 100 miles (160 km) north of Puerto Rico at 20°N 66°W on 19 July 1805, on a journey from Jamaica to Barbados with despatches for Vice-Admiral Lord Nelson, when she was spotted at daybreak by a French squadron. This force included the 40-gun frigate Topaze, 22-gun sloop Départment des Landes, 18-gun corvette Torche, and 16-gun brig Faune. It was commanded by Captain François-André Baudin.

Mudge initially took the French squadron to be a British convoy that had also been sailing in the area, and he moved towards the ships. When the French began closing with him and ignored Blanche's signals Mudge realised his mistake and attempted to run from the superior force. Blanche had lost almost all her copper sheathing in the previous nine months of service, and as such she sailed very poorly and the French were easily able to catch up with the frigate. The battle began at about 11 a.m. when Topaze reached Blanche, exchanging broadsides on the British ship's starboard side. Départment des Landes came up and occupied Blanche's starboard quarter and stern alongside Topaze, attacking with their chase guns. Faune did not close with the British frigate. After half an hour of battle Blanche attempted to get across Topaze's bow to rake her, but as she manoeuvred, the French vessel luffed up behind Blanche and achieved a raking fire of her own through Blanche's stern. The battle continued for forty-five minutes, with the French destroying all of Blanche's sails and rigging, leaving her unable to manoeuvre and her fore and main masts disabled.

At about 12 a.m. Mudge surrendered Blanche in a sinking state, having lost eight members of the crew killed and a further fifteen wounded. French casualties were minimal, with Topaze having three men killed and nine wounded. The French took control of Blanche, but at 6 p.m. found her to be sinking and unrecoverable. Her timbers were infected with dry rot and had broken easily under the French gunnery. The frigate was set on fire, burning to the waterline before sinking in the evening.

=== Aftermath ===
Twenty-two members of Blanche's crew were taken on board Faune, which was then captured to the west of Rochfort on 15 August by the 74-gun ship of the line HMS Goliath and 20-gun post ship HMS Camilla. Later in the day Goliath, now accompanied by the 64-gun ship of the line HMS Raisonnable, found the other three ships of the French squadron to the south. These vessels scattered to avoid the powerful British ships, with Goliath chasing and capturing Torche soon afterwards, recovering another fifty-two of Blanche's crew. Raisonnable instead focused on Topaze, getting in range on 16 August, but was forced to give up the chase when Topaze's chase guns did heavy damage to her rigging, leaving both Topaze and Départment des Landes to escape, the former to Lisbon with Mudge on board. Having reached Lisbon, Mudge and the crew remaining with him were released upon application from the British consul there.

Despite some suggestions that Blanche had not been fully prepared for the fight and had given up too easily, Mudge was honourably acquitted in a court martial at Plymouth on 14 October for losing his ship. Rear-Admiral John Sutton praised Mudge's

"very able and gallant conduct in the defence made by you of his Majesty’s late ship the Blanche, against a very superior force of the enemy’s ships; and likewise of the spirited support afforded you by the officers of every description, as well as the seamen and royal marines, under your command, in the discharge of their duty; and which reflects upon you and them the highest degree of merit and approbation"

James has questioned how truthful Mudge was in his account of the loss of Blanche, noting how he greatly overestimated the strength of his four opponents in his reports and made suggestions of much higher casualties than had actually occurred. The French officers involved also negated Mudge's account of an especially hard-fought battle, noting how only Topaze had truly engaged Blanche, with the other vessels firing very few shots at the British ship, and those mostly at the rigging and masts. James ends his debate on the merits of the defence of Blanche by saying:

"We confess our inability to discover any thing calculated to distinguish this case of defence and surrender from others that have occurred; not, at least, on the score of superior merit"

The historian E. V. E. Sharpston builds on James' argument, concluding that:

"It is difficult to escape the conclusion (reinforced by other episodes in his career) that Mudge was inept, his crew slack, and that neither measured up to Captain Baudin and his crew"

Part of Blanche's wreck, including her mainmast, was found floating at 22°N 63°W by the American schooner Sally on 27 July; the ship then found another mast a mile onward, with rigging and an anchor still attached. A still flying battle ensign could be seen underwater. Markings on the recovered material led the captain of Sally to initially announce that he had discovered the destruction of the 74-gun ship of the line HMS Blenheim rather than the remains of Blanche, but this was rectified by a report in The Times on 16 October.
