= French frigate Topaze (1805) =

Gloire-class 44-gun frigate of the French Navy

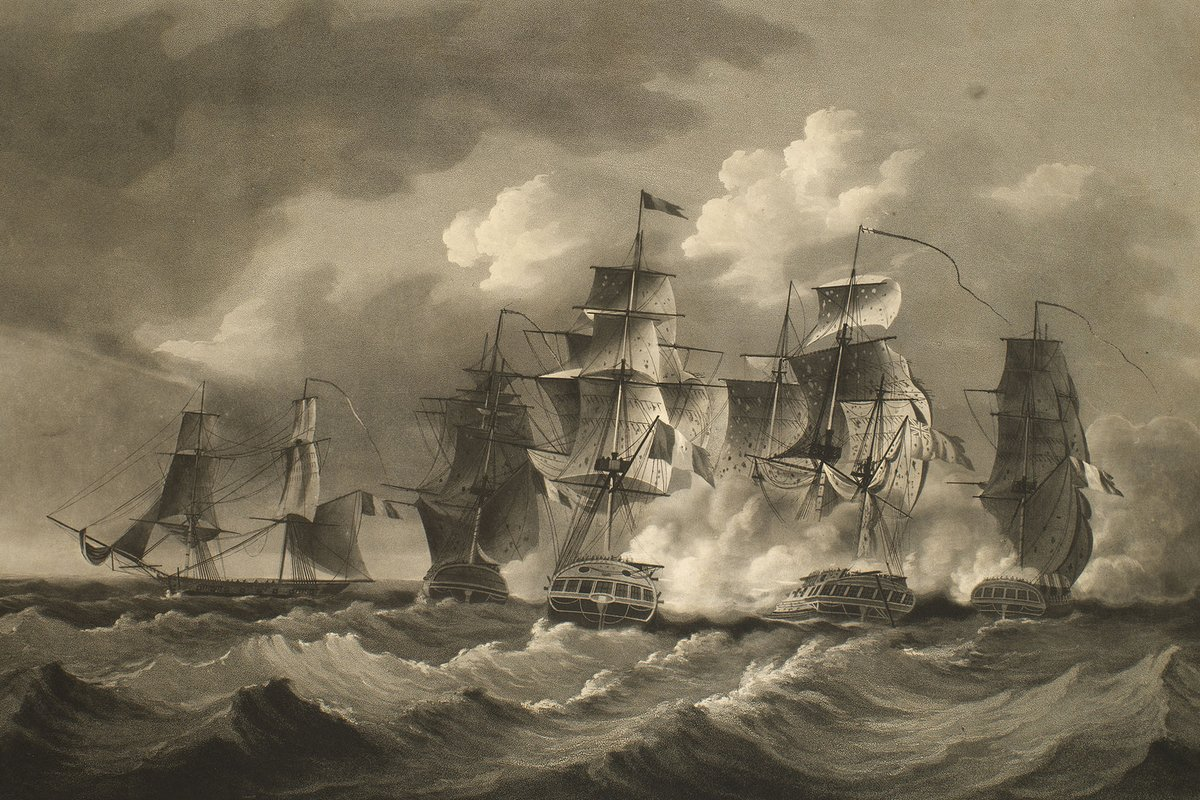
- Action off Porto Rico on 19 July 1805: Topaze, Départment des Landes, Torche and Faune destroy HMS Blanche.

History

France
- Name: Topaze
- Builder: Nantes Dockyard
- Laid down: 1803
- Launched: 1 March 1805
- Commissioned: September 1805
- Captured: 22 January 1809

United Kingdom
- Name: HMS Jewel
- Acquired: 22 January 1809
- Renamed: HMS Alcmene
- Fate: Scrapped, 1816

General characteristics
Type	Frigate
Tons burthen	1148 bm
Length	46 metres (151 ft)
Beam	12 metres (39 ft)
Draught	7 metres (23 ft)
Complement	330 men
Armament	40 guns: Battery: 28 × 18-pounder long guns; Quarterdeck and forecastle: 12 × 8-pounder long guns
Armour	Timber

Topaze was a Gloire-class 44-gun frigate of the French Navy. The British captured her in 1809 and she then served with the Royal Navy under the name Jewel, and later Alcmene until she was broken up in 1816.

== French service ==
She was built in Nantes in 1803 on plans by Pierre-Alexandre-Laurent Forfait and launched on 1 March 1805. She was put into service in September.

She departed from Nantes in June 1805 for Fort-de-France to carry new instructions to Admiral Villeneuve, but failed to reach him as the fleet was already heading for Europe. On 19 July she was the lead vessel of a squadron of four vessels that captured HMS Blanche. The other three were the 22-gun corvette Départment des Landes, the 18-gun Torche, and the 16-gun brig-corvette Faune.

On 14 August, a British squadron comprising the 74-gun Goliath, HMS Camilla and HMS Raisonnable captured Faune, which was trailing. Two days later, the British caught up with the three remaining ships, and Baudin had to abandon Torche, which surrendered after a token resistance against Goliath.

Raisonnable chased Topaze, which she engaged in the morning of 17 August. The two ships were becalmed at first and unable to manoeuver, until Topaze caught some breeze. Baudin prepared to board Raisonnable, but abandoned the project after considering that his frigate was ferrying the crew of Blanche; he later told Captain Mudge to testify that Raisonnable would have been taken, had it not been for Mudge's presence on Topaze.

On 13 January 1803, Topaze, Pierre-Nicolas Lahalle, approached Cayenne. She was carrying flour and was under orders to avoid combat. At the time, the sloop HMS Confiance was at Cayenne, supporting the Portuguese conquest of French Guiana. However, three-quarters of her crew, as well as her captain, James Lucas Yeo, were ashore, attacking the French defenders. Midshipman G. Yeo, Yeo's younger brother, another midshipman, the remaining 25 men of the crew, and 20 local Negroes that the two midshipmen induced to join them, set sail towards Topaze. Topaze, judging from the sloop's boldness that she had company that would be forthcoming, turned away.

A little over a week later, Topaze met HMS Cleopatra, which captured Topaze in the subsequent action of 22 January 1809. The British took her into the Royal Navy as HMS Jewel.

== British service ==
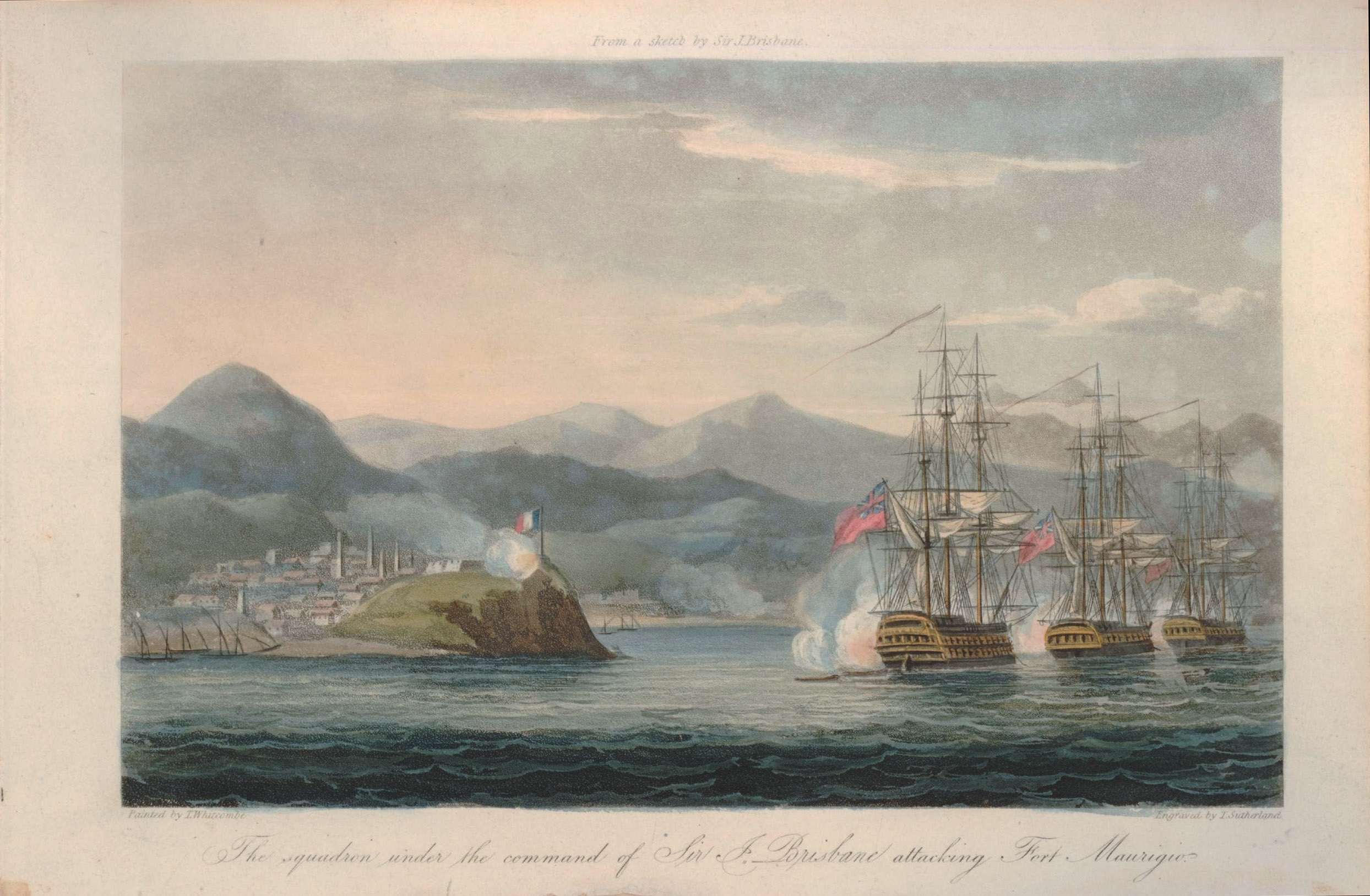
Alcmene and the Squadron under the command of Sir James Brisbane attacking Fort Maurigio on 11 April 1814

After the loss of Alcmene in 1809, Jewel was renamed Alcmene later that year.

On 5 October 1809 Alcmene was in company with Wanderer and Pelter and all three shared in proceeds of the capture of George. Prize money was forwarded in 1815 from the Vice admiralty court in Antigua.

On 23 December 1813, Alcmene captured the Cerf-class schooner Fleche between Corsica and Cape Delle Molle. Fleche was armed with 12 guns, and carried a crew of 99 men and 24 soldiers. She was carrying the soldiers from Toulon to Corsica. French records place the capture off Vintimilles, and add the Fleche was escorting the storeships Lybio and Baleine, which were also carrying troops for Ajaccio, Corsica. That same day Euryalus drove Baleine, ashore near Calvi, where she bilged on the rocks. Baleine was armed with 22 guns and carried a crew of 120 men.

Alcmene was in company with Pembroke and Aigle on 11 April 1814 when they captured Fortune, Notre Dame de Leusainte, and a settee of unknown name. (Note: A first-class share of the prize money was worth £95 4s 0d; a sixth-class share, that of an ordinary seaman, was worth 12s 7d.)

On 13 May 1815 Alcmene, with Captain Jeremiah Coghlan in command, was present at the surrender of Naples during the Neapolitan War. A British squadron, consisting of Alcmene, and more importantly the 74-gun Tremendous, the sloop Partridge, and the brig-sloop Grasshopper blockaded the port and destroyed all the gunboats there. Parliament voted a grant of £150,000 to the officers and men of the squadron for the property captured at the time, with the money being paid in May 1819. (Note: A first-class share for each of the captains on the first three ships was worth £5805 3s 0d; a sixth-class share was worth £60 13s 11d. The amounts were equivalent to 10-20 years salary for a captain and more than two years for an ordinary seaman.)

On 6 July, Alcmene captured the French naval schooner Antelope (Antilope) off Sardinia. Antilope was a Cerf-class schooner armed with two chase guns of 6 or 8-pounds, and two 24-pounder carronades. She had a complement of 86 men and displaced 273 tons (French).

== Fate ==
The Principal Officers and Commissioners of His Majesty's Navy offered the "Topaze, of 38 guns and 917 tons", lying at Portsmouth, for sale on 11 August 1814. The buyer had to post a bond of £3,000, with two guarantors, that they would break up the vessel within a year of purchase. Topaze did not sell immediately and was not broken up until February 1816.
