= HMS Maria (1807) =

Brig of the Royal Navy

History

United Kingdom
- Name: HMS Maria
- Acquired: 1807 by purchase
- Commissioned: c. April 1808
- Fate: Captured 1808

France
- Name: Maria
- Acquired: 1808 by capture
- Fate: Burned February 1809

General characteristics
- Type: gun-brig
- Tons burthen: 172 (bm)
- Propulsion: Sails
- Sail plan: Brig
- Complement: 65
- Armament: 12 × 12-pounder carronades, 2 × 4-pounder bow chasers

HMS Maria was a gun-brig the Royal Navy purchased in 1807 and commissioned at Antigua in 1808. On 29 September 1808 the French Navy corvette French corvette Department des Landes captured her. The French burnt Maria in February 1809 at Martinique to prevent her recapture.

== History ==
The Royal Navy commissioned Maria at Antigua in the West Indies in April 1808 under the command of Lieutenant James Bennett.

=== Action of 29 September ===
On 29 September 1808, Maria was sailing off Guadeloupe when she encountered Départment des Landes, of 22 guns (sixteen 24-pounder carronades, four 12-pounder guns, and two 9-pounder guns on the quarterdeck), plus a large pivot gun on the forecastle. (Note: James says sixteen 24-pounder carronades and four long 8-pounders on the main deck, two brass 6-pounders on the quarterdeck, plus a large swivel gun on the forecastle.) (Note: Dyason gives the French vessel's name as Sards, which perhaps was a nickname.) Départment des Landes had a crew of at least 160 men and boys, commanded by Captain Joseph-François Raoul.

Unable to maneuver, Maria took two broadsides. The French called on Bennett to surrender, which he refused. Three grapeshot from the next broadside killed him. The master, Joseph Dyason, then continued the combat but eventually had to strike. Maria had suffered six men killed, including Bennett, and nine wounded. The French had suffered at most a couple of men wounded. After the French had gotten all their prisoners off Maria, the French prize crew had to run her aground at Guadeloupe to prevent her from sinking due to the damage she had sustained. The French provided a cartel to Dominica to permit Dyason to report the loss to Rear-Admiral Alexander Cochrane.

Lloyd's List reported on 9 December 1808 that a French corvette had captured Maria at the end of September after a severe action. Her captors had sent Maria into Guadeloupe.

=== French service ===
The French later refloated Maria and took her into the French Navy under her existing name. The French burnt her at Martinique in February 1809 to prevent the British from capturing her during their invasion of Martinique.
