= François-André Baudin =

French Navy officer (1774–1842)

Baudin's coat of arms

Counter-Admiral François-André Baudin (2 December 1774 – 18 June 1842) was a French Navy officer who served in the French Revolutionary and Napoleonic Wars. His nephew Auguste Baudin also served as an officer in the French navy.

== Life ==
He took part in the Baudin expedition to Australia, led by his namesake Nicolas Baudin, leaving Le Havre on 19 October 1800. He was a lieutenant de vaisseau on board the Géographe, a vessel whose officers also included an ensign (aspirant) called Charles Baudin. François-André Baudin fell ill and was left behind on île de France in April 1801.

Under the First French Empire, François-André Baudin rose to ship-of-the-line captain, commanding a force made up of the frigate Topaze (his flagship), the corvettes Département-des-Landes (captained by Desmontils) and Torche (captained by Dehen) and the brig Faune (captained by Brunet). Cruising off Barbados, this force captured the British frigate Blanche, though Faune and Torche were later captured by a British squadron consisting of the ship of the line HMS Goliath and frigates HMS Camilla and HMS Raisonnable. Topaze was also involved in the action, exchanging cannon fire with Raisonnable before escaping to the Tagus.

On 21 October 1809, Baudin was ordered to take the 80-gun ships of the line Robuste and Borée, the 74-gun Lion and the frigates Pauline and Pomone and escort a twenty-ship convoy from Toulon to Barcelona to supply French troops fighting in the Peninsular War. This French force was met by a superior British squadron under George Martin on 25 October. Seeing that the British had gained speed and were trying to block their path, Baudin ordered his ships to make for land as fast as possible, but this only led to the Robuste and Lion going aground – to deny them to the British, Baudin ordered them set on fire and scuttled near Frontignan. Captain Senèz, commanding the Borée, stayed further offshore whilst still obeying Boudin's orders – he passed through the middle of the British squadron and escaped into the port of Sète, normally too small for ships of the line.

== Titles ==
- Baron de l'Empire (16 February 1810).
