= French corvette Faune (1804) =

French naval Abeille-class brig-corvette

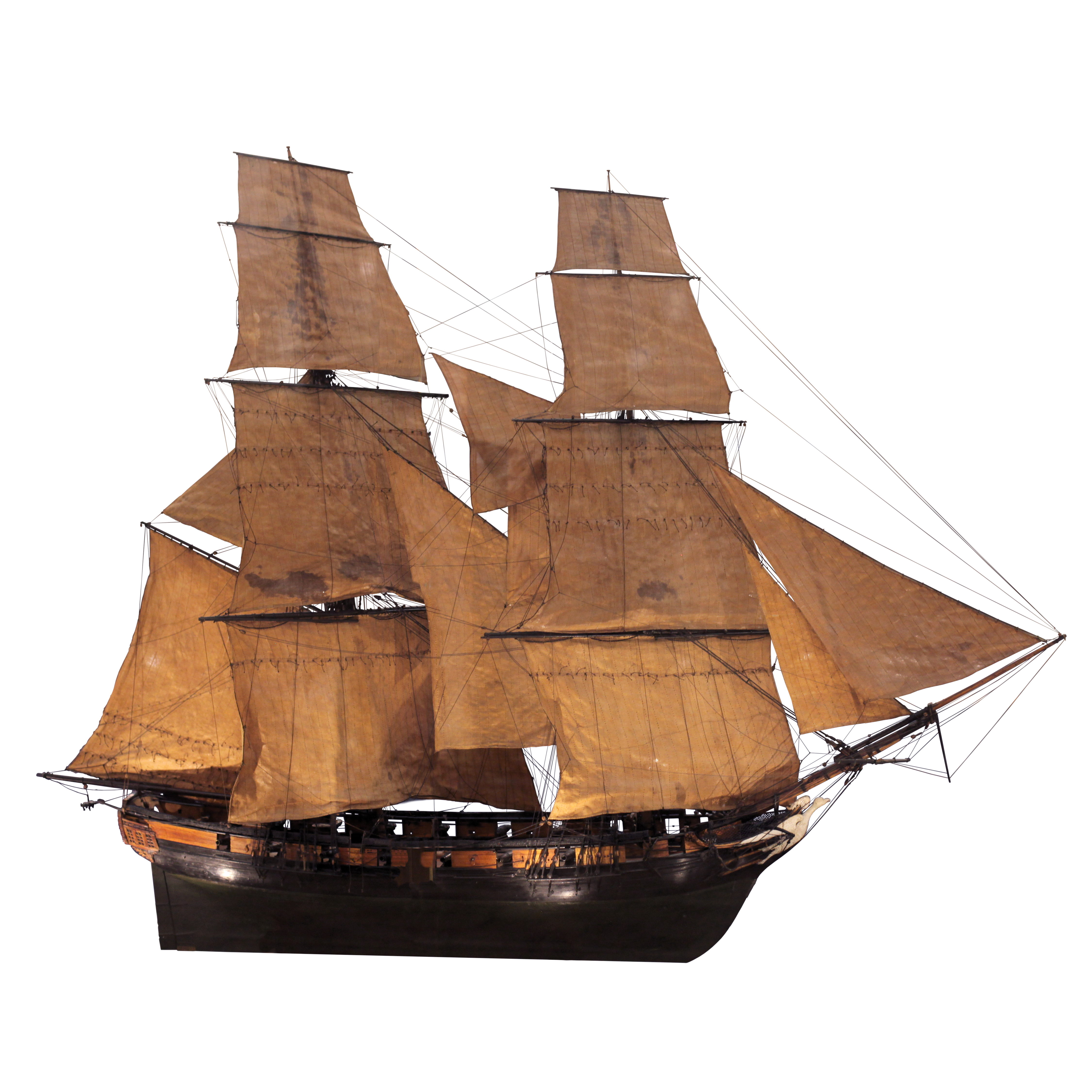
- 1/36 scale model of Cygne, sister-ship of Faune, on display at the Musée national de la Marine in Paris

History

France
- Name: Faune
- Namesake: The Faun
- Ordered: 22 August 1803
- Builder: Louis, Antoine, & Mathurin Crucy, Basse-Indres, Nantes
- Laid down: February 1804
- Launched: 8 July 1804
- Captured: 15 August 1805

United Kingdom
- Name: HMS Fawn
- Namesake: The young of the deer
- Acquired: 15 August 1805 by capture
- Fate: Disappears from records after 1806

General characteristics
- Class & type: Abeille-class Brig
- Displacement: 158/290 tons (French; unladen/laden)
- Tons burthen: c.325 (bm)
- Length: c. 95 ft (29 m) (overall); c. 75 ft (23 m) (keel)
- Beam: c. 28 ft (8.5 m)
- Depth of hold: c. 7 ft (2.1 m)
- Propulsion: Sails
- Sail plan: Brig
- Complement: French: 94; British: 121 (British establishment)
- Armament: French: 16 × 6-pounder guns; British: 14 × 24-pounder carronades + 2 × 6-pounder bow chasers

Faune was a French naval Abeille-class brig-corvette launched in 1804 to a design by François Pestel in 1803. She participated in the capture of HMS Blanche in July 1805. The Royal Navy captured Faune in August 1805. She was taken into service as HMS Fawn, but the last record of her dates to 1806. In 1807 the Royal Navy launched a new HMS Fawn.

== Career ==
On 19 July 1805 Faune was part of a squadron of four vessels that captured Blanche off Puerto Rico, three days after they had left Martinique. The other three were the 40-gun French frigate Topaze, the 22-gun corvette Department des Landes, and the 18-gun Torche. Faune was under the command of Lieutenant Charles Brunet.

About one month later, Faune, still under the command of enseigne de vaisseau Brunet, was carrying dispatches from Fort-de-France to Saint-Nazaire via Saint-Martin-de-Ré. When she was southwest of Ouessant, on 15 August, she had the misfortune to encounter HMS Camilla. Camilla chased Faune for nine hours before capturing her at 45°18′N 7°36′W. The 74-gun, third rate Goliath was in the Channel Fleet when she saw a sail to eastward and three sail to westward. Goliath sailed east and joined the chase, helping Camilla to capture Faune. Faune was armed with 16 guns and had on board 98 men. (Note: In his letter on the loss of Blanche, Captain Zachary Mudge described Faune as having on board 120 men plus three officers of the Legion de Midi. He also gave the name of her captain as Delon, and that of Torche as Brunet.) She also had on board as prisoners 22 men from Blanche.

After Goliath helped Camilla capture Faune, Goliath set off in chase of the other three French vessels. Raisonnable joined Goliath and they were able to capture Torche, but Topaze and Department-des-Landes escaped. The Royal Navy later took Torche into service as HMS Torch

Captain Robert Barton of Goliath sent Faune into Portsmouth with Camilla. Barton reported that Faune was a new ship, on her first voyage, from Martinique, extremely fast, and would make a good addition to the Royal Navy.

The Royal Navy took Faun into service as HMS Fawn. However, after 1806 there are no records of her.
