= USS Mosquito (schooner) =

Schooner of the Continental Navy

History

United States
- Name: Mosquito
- Fate: Captured and burnt 1777

General characteristics (at capture)
- Type: Schooner
- Armament: 6 × 3-pounder guns; 4 × swivel guns

USS Mosquito was a 6-gun schooner of the Continental Navy. Much of the information around the ship comes from her capture and destruction in July 1777. Even the Dictionary of American Naval Fighting Ships (DANFS) has nothing about the vessel.

On 1 October 1776, the Continental Marine Committee ordered Lieutenant Thomas Albertson to sail Mosquito to North Carolina with letters, and to bring back such naval stores as he could gather. Then on 10 October the Marine Committee formally established the ranks and precedence of the commanders of vessels in the Continental Navy. Albertson was the commander of the smallest vessel, Mosquito, of four guns, ranked 26th out of 26.

The next (implicit) mention of Mosquito occurs on 22 April 1777 when the Navy Board of the Middle Department asked to borrow 70 shot for 2-pounder guns. Albertson carried out the request, which he needed for his vessel, which was almost ready for sea.

On 6 July 1777 Captain John Linzee, of HMS Pearl, sent the schooner Endeavour, a longboat, and a sloop and yawl, prizes to Camilla, up Duck Creek, which empties into Delaware Bay, some five to six miles SEE from Bombay Hook. The expedition was under the command of Pearl's sailing master.

The expedition returned the next day. The British captured Mosquito, still under the command of Albertson, at 3 in the morning, without any opposition as the only people aboard were her master and gunner. She was armed with six 3-pounder guns and four swivel guns; the expedition burned her after taking their two prisoners off.
