= Nicholas Diddams =

English shipbuilder

Nicholas Diddams (c.1760–1823) was a Master Shipwright mainly building for the Royal Navy.

== Life ==
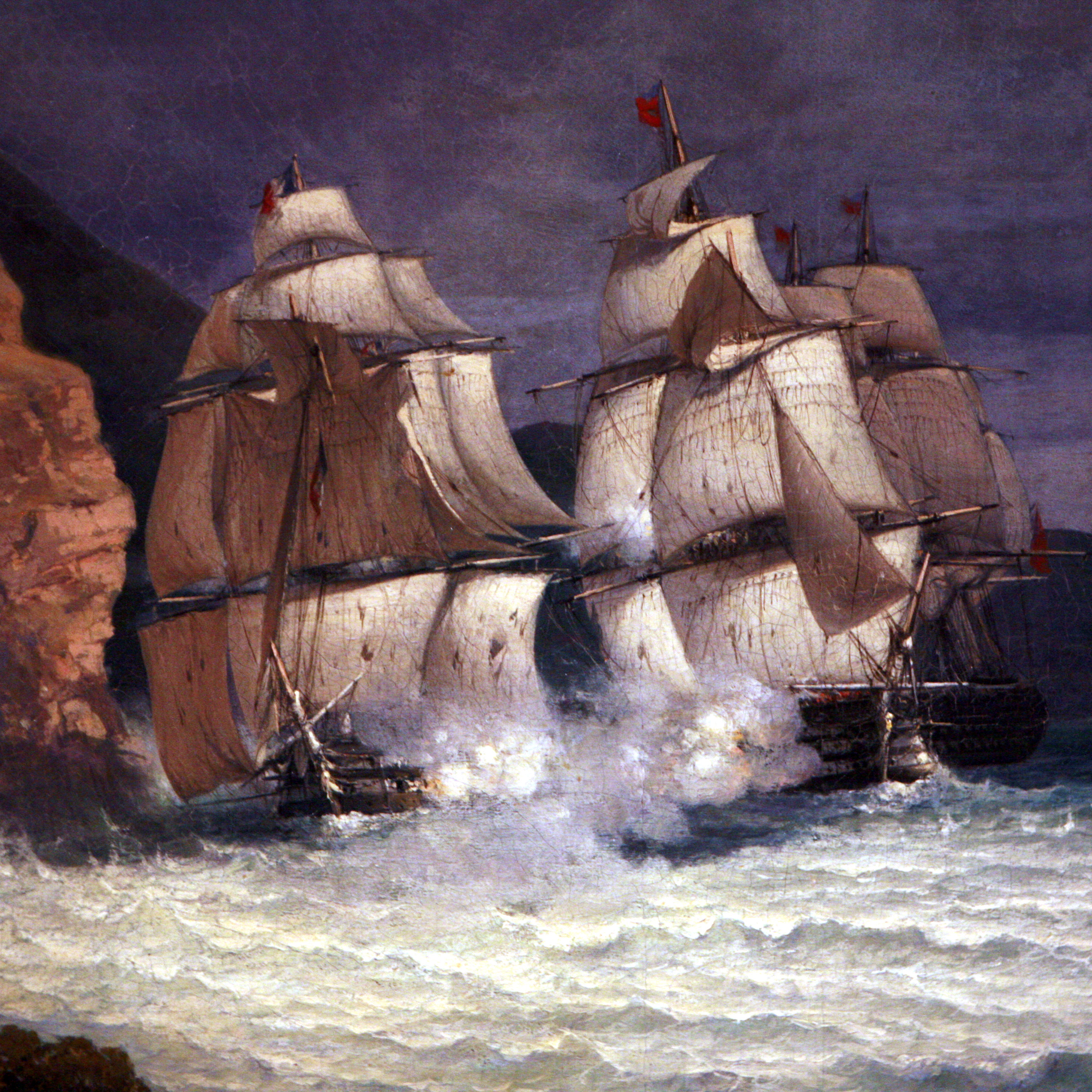
HMS Boyne v Romulus

He was born around 1760 the son of Nicholas Diddams (b.1731) and grandson of John Diddams (1687-1766) and his wife Mary Rolfe (1702-1777).

He appears to have been involved in the design of HMS Experiment (1784). This would place him in Boston, Lincolnshire for the period 1782 to 1784. The Experiment was a cutter employed by HM Revenue services, guarding against smuggling.

He appears in a document of August 1797 has a shipwright concluding the apprenticeship of a John Lane.

In November 1802 he was appointed Chief Shipwright at Sheerness Dockyard. Given that all ships he built were truly huge he must have had considerable experience prior to 1802 to be given such major responsibility. He worked with Sir John Henslow building HMS Antelope. The Royal Navy were so impressed that they moved him to be Chief Shipwright of the far larger Portsmouth Dockyard in 1802/3. He launched his first ship there in 1806.

In 1808 he made a survey drawing of "Algesiras" a Spanish captured ship, brought to Portsmouth for a refit to Royal Navy standards.

Due to the huge lead-in period between commissioning in relation to "need" and launching, the end of the Napoleonic Wars meant that many of his final masterpieces never saw any major action and became obsolete without another war arising.

He died in Portsmouth in 1823. His will is held in the National Archive at Kew.

== Ships built ==
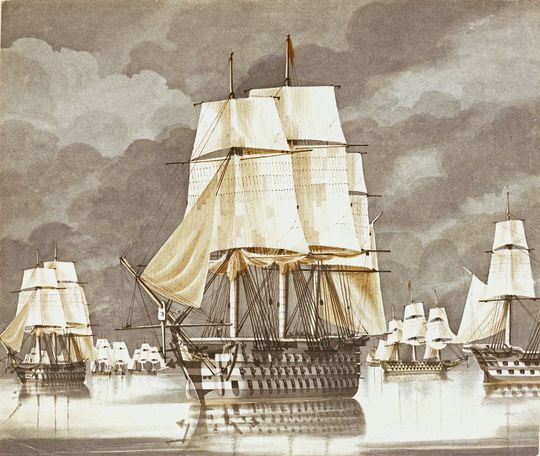
HMS Princess Charlotte

- HMS Asia
- Rowing galley "Prince of Wales" (1801) built at Sheerness
- HMS Antelope (1802) 50-gun, crew of 350 built at Sheerness
- HMS Alexandria (1806) 32-gun, crew of 215
- Survey and refit of captured French ship HMS Marengo in 1806
- Survey and refit of captured Danish ship HMS Justitia relaunched 1807
- HMS Bulwark (1807) 74-gun, crew of 640
- HMS Brazen (1808) 18-gun, crew of 121
- HMS Podargus (1808) 14 gun sloop, crew of 86
- HMS Zephyr (1809) 14 gun sloop, crew of 86
- HMS Primrose (1810 18 gun sloop
- HMS Boyne (1810), 98-gun, crew of 738
- Survey and refit of HMS Asia a 64-gun captured Spanish ship
- HMS Childers (1812) 16 gun, crew of 121
- HMS Grasshopper (1813) 16 gun, crew of 121
- HMS Vindictive (1813) 74-gun, crew of 590
- HMS Icarus (1814) 10 gun sloop, crew of 76
- HMS Pallas (1816) 36-gun, crew of 264
- HMS Pitt (1816) 74-gun ship of the line, crew of 590
- Survey and refit of HMS Royal George in 1817
- HMS Waterloo (1818) 80-gun ship of the line, crew of 650 (later renamed "HMS Bellerophon")
- HMS Minerva (1820) 46-gun, crew of 284
- HMS Princess Charlotte (1825) huge 110-gun ship of the line, crew of 738 - completed after Diddam's death
