= HM hired armed cutter Duchess of York =

History

Great Britain
- Builder: Dover
- Launched: 1790
- Fate: Last listed in 1808

General characteristics
- Tons burthen: 52, or 54 (bm)
- Sail plan: Cutter, later Sloop
- Armament: 6 × 4-pounder guns

Duchess of York was a vessel probably launched in 1790. She served the Royal Navy as a hired armed cutter between 1795 and 1800. From 1801 she was a merchantman, sailing primarily between Dover and Exmouth. She is last listed in 1808.

== Career ==
Duchess of York's early career is obscure. She does not appear in Lloyd's Register until after her service with the Royal Navy.

Hired armed cutter: The Admiralty employed Duchess of York as a hired armed cutter. Records suggest that her contract ran from 9 March 1795 to 2 January 1799. However, there is little record of her activities prior to 1799, and there are several accounts of her activities as a cutter in 1800.

The brig Pelican, loaded with barley, arrived at Portsmouth on 5 February 1799, after Duchess of York had recaptured her.

During the evening of 29 January 1800, off Le Havre, HMS Camilla captured the French privateer lugger Vigoureaux (or Vigoreaux). Vigoureaux was armed with three guns, had a crew of 26 men and was 19 days out of Cherbourg, not having taken anything. Duchess of York was in sight. Vigoureux had been commissioned in 1799.

Lloyd's List reported on 21 February that Honfleur and Dorade, two prizes to the cutters Duchess of York and Fly, had arrived at Portsmouth.

Duchess of York, under the command of Lieutenant Lundy, arrived at Portsmouth on 4 April from a cruise off Havre. She brought in with her the brig Alexander, which had come from Lisbon and had been bound for Altona, Hamburg. Duchess of York had intercepted Alexander going into Havre with a cargo of fruit, etc.

This capture gave rise to a court case in 1800 in which Alexander's owners challenged her seizure. The facts of the case, per the owner, a Danish merchant, were that he had purchased Alexander, of Altona, on 15 March 1799 at Saint-Malo. She sailed to Altona in ballast. There she took on a cargo to Lisbon, and was under orders to return to Altona. At Lisbon she took in a cargo of cotton, coffee, sugar, &c. When ready to sail from Lisbon she had a fortnight's old sound provisions on board, but her master chose to purchase a barrel of beef and a hundred weight of biscuit. She departed from Lisbon on 9 March, and on the 15th, being off the coast of France, the crew discovered that the purchased beef was offensive and bad. The captain, although he had twenty days good old provisions, decided to sail for the first port in France for more. That port was Havre de Grace.

In the case it was proved the master knew that Havre de Grace was under a British blockade. About four leagues from Havre, Duchess of York came up under French colours, and after examination, seized Alexander for having broken the neutrality. At the time there was another cutter in sight.

The attorney for Alexander argued that she was in want of provisions, and that a further elucidation was unnecessary. The Judge entered into the cause at full length. The ship and part of the cargo were condemned as prize to the two cutters.

Merchantman: Duchess of York appears in Lloyd's Register for 1801 with J. Lucas, master, changing to J. Luckhurst, Rogers & Co. owner, and trade Exmouth–Dover. The entry gave her a launch year of 1790, and launch place of Dover. (The Register of Shipping for 1802 gave a launch year for Dutchess of York of 1789, but otherwise agreed with Lloyd's Register.) This information continued unchanged to her last listing in 1808.
