= HMS Partridge (1809) =

UK naval sloop 1809–1816

History

United Kingdom
- Name: Partridge
- Ordered: 19 November 1805
- Builder: John Avery, Dartmouth
- Laid down: March 1806
- Launched: 15 July 1809
- Fate: Broken up, September 1816

General characteristics
- Class & type: Cormorant-class ship-sloop
- Tons burthen: 42275/94 (bm)
- Length: 108 ft 4 1/2 in (33.0 m) (o/a); 90 ft 9 7/8 in (27.7 m) (Keel)
- Beam: 29 ft 7 in (9.0 m)
- Draught: 8 ft 11 in (2.7 m)
- Complement: 121
- Armament: Upper deck: 16 × 32 pdr carronades; QD: 6 × 18 pdr carronades; Fc: 2 × 6 pdr guns + 2 × 18 pdr carronades

HMS Partridge was a Cormorant-class ship-sloop launched in 1809. She captured some small vessels while serving in the Mediterranean in 1813–1814. She participated in the blockade of Naples in 1815 with the result that her officers and crew received a great deal of prize money for its fall. She was broken up in 1816.

== Career ==
Commander William Foote commissioned Partridge in September 1809. She escorted a convoy to the West Indies on 26 October 1810.

In October 1810 Commander J. M. Ayde assumed command of Partridge.

When news of the outbreak of the War of 1812 reached Britain, the Royal Navy seized all American vessels then in British ports. Partridge was among the Royal Navy vessels then lying at Spithead or Portsmouth and so entitled to share in the grant for the American ships Belleville, Janus, Aeos, Ganges and Leonidas seized there on 31 July 1812. (Note: A first-class share was worth £20 19s; a sixth-class share, that of an ordinary seaman, was worth 4s 1d; the Commander in Chief received £230 10s 8d.)

In 1813 and 1815 Partridge served in the Mediterranean.

On 18 July 1813, while off Manfredonia, HMS Havannah and Partridge attacked a small convoy and captured or destroyed all the vessels. They captured one Neapolitan gunboat armed with one 18-pounder gun, and burnt another. They also destroyed a pinnace armed with one 6-pounder gun. Lastly, they captured two trabaccolos armed with three guns each and laden with salt, and destroyed two others of the same strength and cargo. (Note: In May 1821 prize money was paid for one trabaccolo and one paranza, laden with salt, captured that day. In 1822 head money was paid for "Gunboats No. 1, 2 and 3".)

On 24 July Partridge captured the Guisto Benfattore, Le Gere, and Desegno. (Note: A first-class share of the prize money was worth £33 13s 7 3/4d; a sixth-class share of the prize money was worth 15s 11 1/2d.)

On 6 November 1813 Partridge recaptured London Packet, Holman, master. (Note: A first-class share of the salvage money was worth £29 17s 2d; a sixth-class share of the prize money was worth 14s 3 3/4d.)

On 13 May 1815 Partridge, was present at the surrender of Naples during the Neapolitan War. A British squadron, consisting of the 74-gun Tremendous, the frigate Alcmene, Partridge, and the brig-sloop Grasshopper blockaded the port and destroyed all the gunboats there.

Parliament voted a grant of £150,000 to the officers and men of the squadron for the property captured at the time, with the money being paid in May 1819. (Note: A first-class share for each of the captains on the first three ships was worth £5805 3s 0d; a sixth-class share was worth £60 13s 11d. The amounts were equivalent to 10-20 years salary for a captain and more than two years for an ordinary seaman. This was net of a reduction due to a payment to the officers and crew of Grasshopper. At the time Naples fell, Grasshopper was away on a mission. The initial payments of prize money therefore went entirely to Tremendous, Alcmene, and Partridge. Commander Sir Charles Burrard, of Grasshopper, sued. The Court ruled that the squadron had been maintaining a blockade and so all vessels that were part of the blockade were entitled to share in the prize money. The officers and men of the other three vessels therefore had to return part of their grants to provide the money for Grasshopper's officers and crew.)

By 1816 Partridge was at Chatham.

== Fate ==
The "Principal Officers an Commissioners of His Majesty's Navy" offered the "Partridge sloop, of 423 tons" "Lying at Chatham" for sale on 31 July 1816. She apparently did not sell and was broken up in September.
