= HMS Brazen (1808) =

Sloop of the Royal Navy

History

United Kingdom
- Name: HMS Brazen
- Ordered: 6 November 1794; cancelled 1799 and re-ordered later
- Builder: Master shipwright Nicholas Diddams, Portsmouth Dockyard
- Laid down: 15 June 1807
- Launched: 26 May 1808
- Fate: Broken up July 1848

General characteristics
- Class & type: Bittern-class ship-sloop
- Tons burthen: 42157/94 (bm)
- Length: 110 ft 3 in (33.6 m) (gundeck); 90 ft 9 7/8 in (27.7 m) (keel)
- Beam: 29 ft 6 1/2 in (9.0 m)
- Draught: Unladen: 8 ft 0 in (2.4 m); Laden: 11 ft 9 in (3.6 m)
- Depth of hold: 8 ft 6 in (2.6 m)
- Sail plan: Full-rigged ship
- Armament: Upperdeck: 18 × 32-pounder carronades; QD: 6 × 12-pounder carronades; Fc: 2 × 12-pounder carronades + 2 × 6-pounder guns

HMS Brazen was a 28-gun Royal Navy Bittern-class ship sloop, launched in 1808.

Though she served during the Napoleonic Wars, she appears to have missed any combat whatsoever and to have taken few prizes in that conflict. However, in the War of 1812 between the United States and the United Kingdom she captured Beaver and Warren in the Gulf of Mexico, but Warren was wrecked on Grand Gosier Island, near New Orleans, in a hurricane. Brazen suffered severe damage in the hurricane and, after local repair, was recalled to England for a survey.

After the survey she escorted convoys to Canada and back and recaptured Daphne. She then carried the Duke of Brunswick to Holland and patrolled the Irish Sea until her return to the West Indies Station. In 1815, she carried the news of the Treaty of Ghent, ending the War of 1812, to the British forces in the Gulf coast, and assisted in carrying them to England. After the war she took part in surveys of the Venezuelan coast and patrolled the Gulf of Mexico, capturing several prizes.

In the 1820s she served with the West Africa Squadron working to suppress the slave trade. In this service she captured numerous slavers and liberated over 2,000 slaves. Brazen ended her career as a floating chapel and was broken up in 1848.

== The War of 1812 ==
She was commissioned by Commander Lewis Shepard in July 1808 for the Jamaica station. She was built in Portsmouth Dockyard by Nicholas Diddams. Shepard was promoted to post-captain on 21 October 1810. From October 1810 she was under the command of Richard Plummer Davies, still on the Jamaica station.

Between June 1812 and August 1818 she was under the command of Commander James Stirling and for most of that time served in the West Indies. Stirling joined the ship in Port Royal Harbour, Jamaica, on 29 June 1812 and on 11 July Brazen left on her first mission in the War of 1812, to harass American ports and shipping in the Gulf of Mexico.

On 6 August 1812, near the Balize entrance to the Mississippi, she captured the US brig Beaver, which was sailing to Havana with a cargo of sugar and coffee. She put the crew and two river pilots ashore and then a prize crew of a lieutenant and five seamen sailed Beaver to Jamaica. (Note: A first-class share of His Majesty's grant of twenty-nine thirtieths of the proceeds, of the hull and part of the cargo of the Beaver was worth £247 0s 6d; a sixth-class share, that of an ordinary seaman, was worth £5 8s. A first-class share of a later distribution of the proceeds from the cargo was worth £213 10s 8d; a sixth-class share was worth £4 13s 9d.)

On 18 August 1812 Brazen captured Warren near Horn Island, off the coast of Mississippi. However, the next day she was cast on shore and wrecked in the hurricane of 19/20 August 1812. Brazen also suffered severely. Lloyd's List reported that she and the frigate Southampton had run aground and lost their masts on the coast of Mississippi, but that the crews were saved. Both vessels were refloated, repaired, and returned to service. Brazen arrived at New Providence; Southampton arrived at Jamaica on 6 October. Although neither vessel was lost in the hurricane, Southampton was lost about a month later when she hit an uncharted rock.

Brazen sheltered in the lee of Grand Gosier Island, the southernmost of the Chandeleur Islands, and jettisoned her three masts and her quarterdeck and forecastle guns, (Note: Although Brazen's log does not specify the number of guns thrown overboard; according to a resident of Pensacola who visited the sloop after her return from patrol, it was ten.) but nevertheless dragged her three anchors to within a quarter of a mile from the beach. When the hurricane had passed, she salvaged the mainmast from the wreck of Warren and limped to the (then) Spanish port of Pensacola. The Spanish authorities allowed her to land some sailors to cut timber for the masts and throughout September the crew replaced the masts and carried out other repairs. On 29 September Brazen left Pensacola to resume her patrol off the mouth of the Mississippi. Stirling soon realised that the repairs had not made the ship completely seaworthy and decided to return her to Port Royal, where she arrived on 20 November. Further repairs were carried out in Jamaica, but the ship was recalled to England for a maintenance survey. She left on 19 December and arrived at Spithead on 9 February 1813, before sailing to Sheerness for the survey.

After the survey she sailed on 4 June 1813 as escort for a convoy carrying stores and settlers to Churchill in Hudson Bay. The vessels were Eddystone, Prince of Wales, and Ann. On 29 June Brazen recaptured Daphne. (Note: The first-class share of the salvage money, i.e., that which would accrue to Stirling, was worth £22 2s and 0d; a sixth-class share, that of an ordinary seaman, was worth 8s 0d.) She anchored off Churchill on 19 August and left again on 20 September, escorting another convoy to England via the Orkney Islands and arriving at the Downs on 25 November.

On her return to England she received a commission in December to take the Duke of Brunswick to Holland. Then, between March and December 1814, she patrolled the Irish Sea and the Outer Hebrides in search of American vessels.

She received a commission to take the news of the Treaty of Ghent, which ended the War of 1812, (Note: The Prince Regent assented to the Treaty of Peace with America... dispatches having been forwarded, with instructions to our Commanders in consequence of the event. These instructions went off in the Brazen, Capt. Stirling, and Kangaroo, Capt. Hall, which [was supposed to have] sailed on Thursday [29 December 1814].) (Note: Plymouth, Jan 2nd. Sailed Brazen, Favorite and Insolent, to the westward.) to Vice Admiral Alexander Cochrane's British task force on the Gulf coast, positioned at Fort Bowyer, which had been captured, and to carry the British troops back to England. Brazen arrived at Jamaica early in February 1815. Her arrival at Fort Bowyer on 13 February forestalled a British attack on Mobile. (Note: 'In consequence of the recent accounts from England, the immediate attack of Mobile is postponed or given up.') On 1 March 1815, she embarked Vicente Sebastián Pintado at Havana for conveyance to Apalachicola, Florida, to meet with Robert Cavendish Spencer. On 8 March, she had returned to Mobile Point.

Brazen left Mobile on 25 March 1815 and sailed from Havana on 4 April, (Note: After a week of great amusement we sailed from Havana.) returning home with General Sir John Lambert, Baynes, his Aide-de-camp, Lieutenant Harry Smith (later Lieutenant General Sir Harry Smith) and as many wounded as she could carry. Smith, in his autobiography, later wrote

Sail was made amid waves mountains high, and the Brazen, as impudent a craft as ever spurned the mighty billows, so beautifully was she managed and steered, rode over or evaded seas apparently over-whelming.

— Sir Harry Smith

They arrived at Portsmouth on 6 May.

== Post-war ==
On 24 September 1816 she captured Hercules in Carlisle Bay, Barbados. Hercules was nicknamed "the Black Frigate" and was the flagship of the Argentinean Admiral William Brown. She was fighting on the side of the Venezuelan revolutionaries against the Spanish and had a valuable cargo of quicksilver, silks, steel, dry goods, and spice taken from Spanish towns and ships. The Governor of Barbados ordered her release, not wishing to prejudice British neutrality in that conflict. However Brazen seized her again after she left Barbados and took her to Antigua. Brown appealed and after long drawn out proceedings the High Court of Admiralty ruled in Brown's favour. Brazen received no prize money and Stirling continued to receive demands for damages for many years.

On 16 February 1817 Brazen captured Henry. (Note: A first-class share for Henry was worth £336 12s 6d; a sixth-class share was worth £8 12s 7 1/2d. No distribution of prize money was made to those who were on board Brazen when Hercules was seized. Their shares were reserved to meet the heavy expenses incurred and likely to arise from that case.)

Between November 1816 and January 1818, Brazen took part in surveys of the Venezuelan coast and a trading arrangement with Simon Bolivar's insurgents may have been agreed on board. On 21 July 1818 she arrived in Portsmouth from Barbados, having made the voyage in 31 days.

Between December 1818 and January 1820 Brazen was at Portsmouth undergoing repairs and being fitted for sea. She was recommissioned in December 1819 under Captain William Shepheard.

In 1820 and 1821 she served at St Helena and Ascension Island before returning to England. She arrived at Portsmouth on 31 October.

In January 1823 Captain George W. Willes took command. On 2 December 1824 she captured Jane and her cargo. On 13 February 1825 she captured the sloop Elizabeth. (Note: A first-class share of the prize money for Elizabeth was worth £52 16s 4d; a sixth-class share was worth 13s 2 1/4d.) On 18 March 1825 she was at Bognor, having chased on shore a tub boat and galley with cargoes of gin, tea, and tobacco. Anti-smuggling patrol might not be glamorous, but it could be lucrative. (Note: A first-class share of the prize money for this capture was worth £254 3s 11 1/2d; a sixth-class share was worth £3 2s 9d.)

On 21 May she captured the French lugger Courier. The revenue cutter Wellington and a boat from Hyperion assisted Brazen. (Note: A first-class share of the prize money was worth £58 9s 9 1/2d; a sixth-class share was worth 15s.) In November 1827 the Treasury gave a grant to the then crew of Brazen for smugglers captured in the year prior to 10 October 1825. (Note: A first-class share was worth £64 6s 9 1/4d; a sixth-class share was worth 10s 5 1/4d.)

== Suppressing the slave trade ==
By November 1825, while under the command of Willes, Brazen was serving with the West Africa Squadron. Although service with the squadron was highly dangerous because of the incidence of disease, it could be highly profitable for a successful captain such as Willes, who would in about a year make multiples of his salary in prize and head money for his capture of slavers. Although the crew received substantially less, they too roughly doubled their annual salary.

On her way out she had brought with her the British explorer Hugh Clapperton and his party. Also, on her way out, she had taken on 25 October the French schooner Éclair, out of Nantes and bound for Havana with 169 slaves aboard. Éclair had embarked the slaves at the River St Paul's near Cape Mount, but had lost a third of them in the surf during the process of embarkation.

Brazen captured the Spanish slave schooner Clara (or Clarita) on 4 November 1825, the brigantine Ninfa (or Ninfa Habanera), of 150 tons, with 231 slaves on board on 7 November 1825, and the Vogel on 22 January 1826. (Note: A first-class share of the head money for these captures, amounted to £518 7s 10 1/2d; a sixth-class share was worth £3 4s.)

On 22 January 1826 Brazen was in Sierra Leone, having sent in Malta, of Liverpool, which had dealt in slaves, and Iberia, of Havana, with 422 slaves on board. She had captured Iberia on 27 December 1825. (Note: A first-class share of the prize money and the head money for the slaves was worth £1400 13s 0 3/4d; a sixth-class share was worth £8 13s 5 1/4.) On 15 May 1826, she seized the schooner Fortunée with 245 slaves. (Note: A first-class share was worth £761 15s 6 3/4d; a sixth-class share was worth £5 1s 2 1/2d.)

On 11 June she seized San Benedicto but the British and Portuguese Mixed Commission Court at Sierra Leone ruled that the ship and her cargo were to be returned to her master. Then on 6 July she captured the Brazilian slave ship St. Benedict, fitted out for 690 slaves, but with only 25 on board. On 16 July she was at Cape Coast Castle, having recently captured the Portuguese slave schooner Fortuna, with 250 slaves on board, 45 of whom died en route for Sierra Leone. On 27 September she seized the brigantine Snelheid with 23 slaves.

On 28 November she was at Badagry, having arrived from Ouidah.

In addition Brazen boarded the following vessels:

- Modeste, 67 tons, of St Pierre, Martinique 269 slaves;
- Constance, 27 tons, of St Pierre, Martinique;
- Felix Africano, Brazilian, licensed to carry 567 slaves;
- Magico, 130 tons, of Havana;
- Eliza, Portuguese, 80 tons;
- Bienfaisant, of Rochelle, not fully fitted;
- Active, 149 tons, of Pernambuco; and
- Orestes, 102 tons, Spanish.

== Fate ==
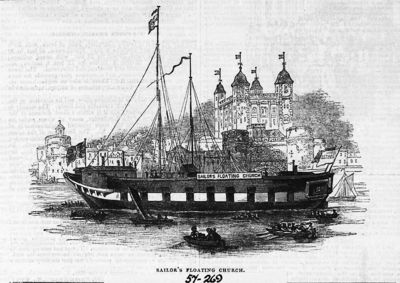
HMS Brazen, circa 1829 fitted out as a floating church, and renamed Bethel

From May to September 1827 Brazen was fitted out at Chatham as an Anglican floating church destined for the Pool of London. On 10 February 1828 she was delivered to the Committee of the Floating Church at Deptford.The Committee returned her in 1846 and she was broken up at Deptford in July 1848.
