= HMS Grasshopper (1813) =

Brig-sloop of the Royal Navy

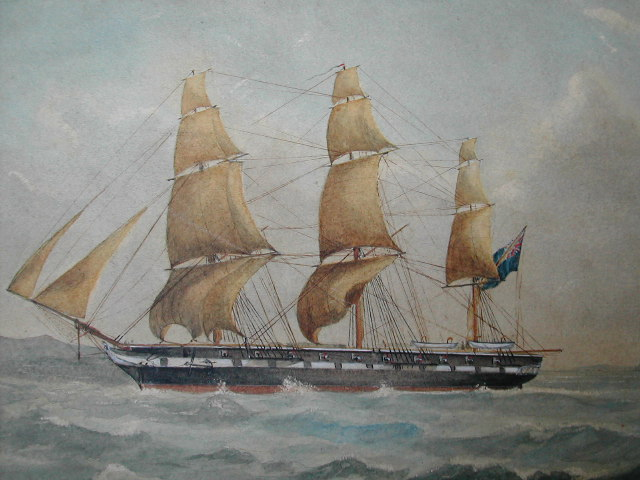
- HMS Pelorus, a sister-ship also converted to a ship-sloop

History

United Kingdom
- Name: HMS Grasshopper
- Ordered: 6 January 1812
- Builder: Master Shipwright Nicholas Diddams, Portsmouth Dockyard
- Laid down: August 1812
- Launched: 16 February 1813
- Commissioned: May 1813
- Out of service: Paid off, 6 September 1831
- Fate: Sold on 30 May 1832

United Kingdom
- Name: Grasshopper
- Owner: Thomas Ward
- Acquired: 1838 by purchase
- Fate: No information post 1847

General characteristics
- Class & type: Cruizer-class brig sloop (ship-sloop from 1822)
- Tons burthen: 381, or 387, or 38241/94, or 404 (bm)
- Length: 100 ft 0 in (30.5 m) (overall) 77 ft 3 1/2 in (23.6 m) (keel)
- Beam: 30 ft 6 in (9.3 m)
- Draught: 6 ft 10 in (2.1 m) (unladen) 11 ft 0 in (3.4 m) (laden)
- Depth of hold: 12 ft 9 in (3.9 m)
- Sail plan: Brig (full-rigged ship from 1822)
- Complement: RN: 121; Whaler (1839):32; Whaler (1843):27
- Armament: 16 × 32-pounder carronades; 2 × 6-pounder guns

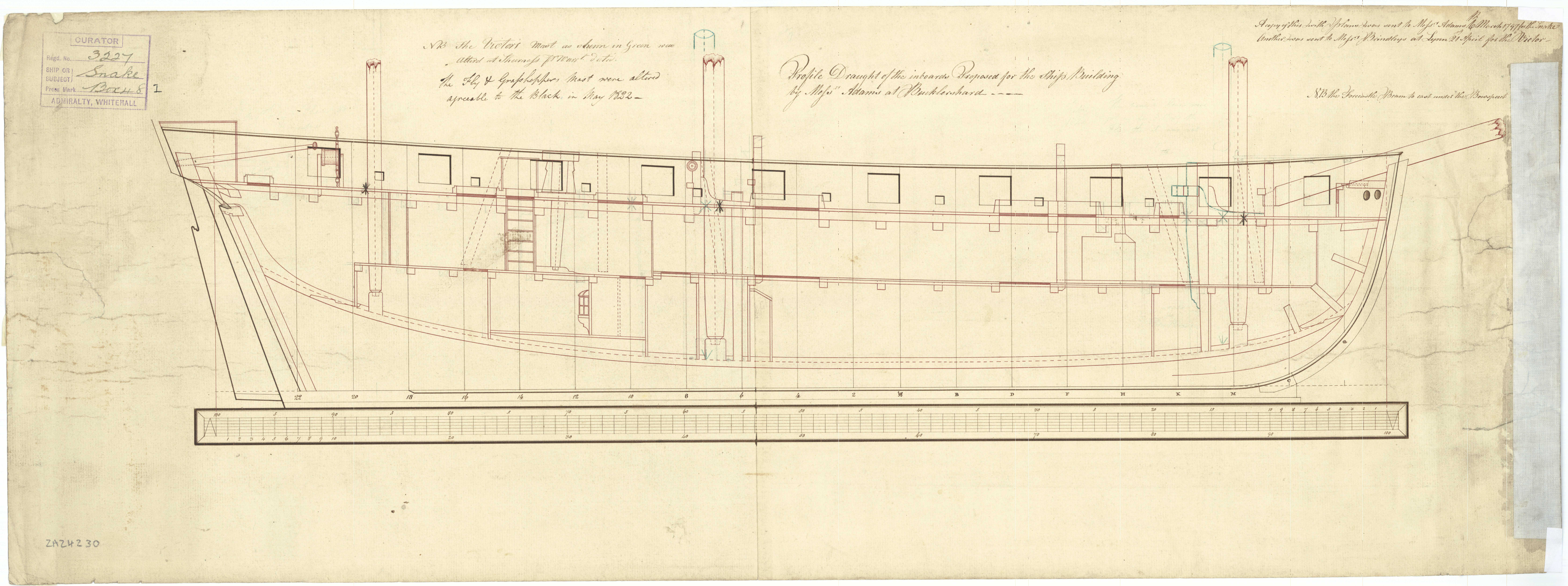
Grasshopper when re-rigged as a ship-sloop in 1822

HMS Grasshopper was a Royal Navy 18-gun Cruizer-class brig-sloop built at Portsmouth Dockyard by Nicholas Diddams and launched in 1813. She was the second ship of the class to bear the name; the first Grasshopper had been stranded at Texel and surrendered to the Batavian Republic on Christmas Day 1811. The present Grasshopper remained in service until sold in 1832. She then became a whaler in the Southern Whale Fisheries, making four voyages between 1832 and 1847.

== Service ==
Grasshopper was commissioned in May 1813 under Commander Henry Battersby.

On 6 October 1813, Grasshopper recaptured the Dryades, Humphries, Master. Dryades had been sailing from Dublin to London when she was captured. After Grasshopper recaptured Dryades, Dryades arrived at Portsmouth on 7 October.

In January 1814 Grasshopper sailed to the Mediterranean. On 29 April and 18 May 1815, she captured the Maruccia, Madonna del Montalleggro, and the Immaculata Concezione. Another report expands on this, crediting Grasshopper with detaining the Concession, sailing from Gallipoli, Apulia to Marseilles, the Madame de Monte Allegro, from Naples, the Majorca, from Naples, the Concizione, from Capo Danza and Messina to Naples, and the Concizime, from Leghorn and Civitavecchia to Naples.

Grasshoper's prize agents, Messers Lark and Woodhead, went bankrupt in 1816. As a result, the last of the prize money from these captures did not arrive until 1850, and then was minor. (Note: A first-class share was worth 16s 8 1/2d; a sixth-class share, the share of an ordinary seaman, was worth 4 1/2d.)

Commander Sir Charles Burrard assumed command in or prior to May 1814.

More importantly, on 13 May was part of the squadron that was present at the surrender of Naples during the Neapolitan War, though she herself was not actually there. A British squadron, consisting of Grasshopper, the 74-gun Tremendous, the frigate Alcmene, and the sloop Partridge blockaded the port and destroyed all the gunboats there. Parliament voted a grant of £150,000 to the officers and men of the squadron for the property captured at the time, the grant being paid in 1816. Initially, Grasshopper was excluded from the payment as she was not actually present, having been sent on an errand. However, Sir Charles Burrard sued and eventually the court agreed that there had been a blockade and that Grasshopper had been part of the blockade and so was entitled to share in the grant. The money was paid in May 1819, with the officers and crew of the other three vessels being required to repay part of their grant. (Note: A first-class share for Sir Charles Burrard was worth £5546 11s 8d; a sixth-class share for an ordinary seaman on Grasshoper was worth £53 1s 7d. The amounts were equivalent to 10–20 years' salary for Barrard and more than two years for an ordinary seaman.)

Grasshopper was paid off in February 1816 and went into Ordinary. She then spent 1816 and 1817 in Portsmouth.

Between January and May 1818 she underwent fitting for sea at Portsmouth. Commander Henry Forbes commissioned her, but in May Commander James Buchan took command for the Newfoundland Station.

From 1818 she was assigned to the North America Station, being based at Halifax and Newfoundland. From May 1819 her captain was Commander David Buchan, and in her he carried out an assignment from the Governor, Sir Charles Hamilton, to return the native woman Demasduwit to her people, the Beothuks. Although she died of tuberculosis before the mission could be accomplished, he transported her body to a Beothuk camp by ascending the Exploits River in January 1820. Seeing signs of the Beothuk, but meeting none, they left her body and possessions in a tent by Red Indian Lake and returned to Grasshopper by the end of February.

Between January and June 1822 Grasshopper was in Portsmouth where the Navy converted her to a ship-sloop. In December 1823 Commander John Alpin took command for the Halifax station.

On 30 March 1824, Grasshopper collided with the British merchant ship Industry at Falmouth, Cornwall, England; Industry sank with the loss of one member of her crew. On 23 December 1826 Commander Courtenay Edward William Boyle assumed command while Grasshopper was at Halifax.

Between June 1827 and February 1828 Grasshopper was at Woolwich undergoing repairs and fitting for sea. Commander Abraham Crawford commissioned her on 8 December 1827 for Jamaica.

From 1828 to 1830 Grasshopper served on the West Indies Station, based in Jamaica. There she was involved in suppressing the slave trade.

On 27 June 1828 she captured Xerxes. Admiral Fleeming had ordered Crawford to patrol Cuba's northwest coast and it was there that Grasshoper encountered Xerxes. Xerxes was armed with one 18-pounder gun, four smaller guns, and her 44-man crew was well supplied with small arms. She had sailed with 426 captives, of whom 406 were still alive. Grasshopper chased Xerxes for 26 hours before capturing her in the Gulf of Mexico; Grasshopper then took her into Havana where British and Spanish Mixed Court condemned (confiscated) the vessel and nominally freed the now 401 surviving captives on 12 July. (Note: Xerxes was a schooner of 138 tons (bm), with a crew of 44 men under the command of Captain Felipe Rebel. She left Havana on 10 February 1828 and acquired her slaves at Bonny.) (Note: A first-class share of the bounty money for 405 slaves, that amount accruing to Crawford, was worth £975 14s 4 1/2d; a sixth-class share, that accruing to an ordinary seaman, was worth £11 12s 3 3/4d. Fleeming received a share equal to half a first-class share.)

On 22 November Grasshopper captured Firme, which was carrying 487 captives when Grasshopper captured her, having started out from the Gold Coast with 492. Firme had a crew of 43 men, four passengers, and was armed with six guns: four 18-pounders, one 12-pounder, and one 24-pounder. She too went into Havana and was condemned on 18 December. (Note: A first-class share of the bounty money for 487 slaves was worth £1091 8s 10d; a sixth-class share was worth £14 8s 5 1/4d. Here, too, Fleeming received a share equal to half a first-class share.) (Note: Firme's master was J. Sandrino, and her owner Jaime Tinto. She had sailed from Havana and acquired captives at "Popo" (either Grand-Popo, or the nearby Little Popo). She arrived back at Havana on 7 December 1828 where the Court of Mixed Commission condemned her.)

Crawford received promotion to post-captain in the hospital ship Magnificent, which was at Port Royal, Jamaica, on 5 January 1829; he invalided back to Britain on 3 April in the yacht Herald later that year.

Commander Charles Deane assumed command of Grasshopper on 5 January 1829. Commander John Elphinstone Erskine replaced him on 3 May 1830.

Disposal: Grasshopper was paid off on 6 September 1831. The Admiralty offered Grasshopper for sale at Portsmouth on 30 May 1832. She was sold on that day to Thomas Ward for £910.

== Whaler ==
Grasshoper underwent a large repair in 1832. She appeared in the Register of Shipping in 1833 with Billinghurst, master, T. Ward, owner, and trade London–Southern Fishery. She then proceeded to make four voyages as a whaler.

=== First whaling voyage (1832–1833) ===
Captain J. Billinghurst sailed from London on 27 December 1832. Grasshopper was reported to have been at Timor, and Mahé, Seychelles. She returned to England on 28 January 1836 with 480 casks of whale oil.

=== Second whaling voyage (1836–1839) ===
Captain Billinghurst sailed again in 1836. Grasshopper was reported at Mahé and off Ceylon. In August 1838 she was at Coringa, having brought from Mahé part of the crew of the barque Ruby, which had foundered on 22 April 1838 at 5°43′S 64°40′E. Billinghurst returned to London on 9 August 1839 with 197 casks of whale oil.

=== Third whaling voyage (1839–1843) ===
Captain Stephen Gardner sailed from London on 14 December 1839 bound for the Pacific Ocean, but died early into the voyage. Captain James Yates replaced Grasshopper was reported at Valdaus, Panama, Tombas (possibly Tumbes, Peru, or Tumbes, Chile, near Talcahuano), Talcahuano, Byron's Island, Bay of Islands, Sunday Island, Navigator Island, Woahoo, Hope Island, and Timor. She returned to England on 4 July 1839 with 220 casks of whale oil.

=== Fourth whaling voyage (1843–1847) ===
Captain G.A. Hansberg (or Hensburg, or Hansbergh) sailed from London on 14 October 1843, bound for Timor. He returned on 18 September 1847 with 280 casks of oil, and one of ambergris. Of the casks of oil, some 10 casks were of sperm oil. He returned to London on 18 September 1847.
