= French gun-vessel Torride =

British merchantman, French navy ship, and British navy ship (11797–1802)

Torride
History

Great Britain
- Name: Sally
- Captured: 1797

France
- Name: Torride
- Acquired: 1797 By capture
- Captured: 25 August 1798

Great Britain
- Name: Torride
- Acquired: 1798 by capture
- Fate: Last listed 1802

General characteristics
- Sail plan: possibly ketch at capture; brig in British service
- Complement: French service:52, but 70 at first capture and 30 at second capture; British service:
- Armament: French service: 2 × 18-pounder guns + 4 swivel guns; British service: 2 guns at recapture

The French gun-vessel Torride was the cutter Sally, of uncertain origin. (Note: She may have been a British vessel by that name that the French captured at Corfu in July 1797. That Sally had a crew of 44 men and had been armed with six guns.) The French Navy named her Torride around end-1797 and brought her into Toulon, where they refitted her as a gun-vessel. The Royal Navy captured her in 1798 at Abukir and took her into service as HMS Torride. She served at the siege of Acre in 1799, where the French recaptured her on 25 August for a few hours before the British recaptured her. She served in the Mediterranean and was last listed in 1802.

== French career ==
She was listed on 18 August 1798 as being stationed near Lake "Madieh" to protect the lines of communication between Rosetta and Abukir. (Note: Lake Madieh was a flooded area south of Aboukir, caused by a breach in the beachwall in 1770. The lake was also sporadically referred to as Aboukir Lake/Aboukir bay by other cartographers and historians.)

== Capture ==
=== British account ===
On 25 August 1798 boats from HMS Goliath cut Torride out from under the guns of the castle of Berquier (Abu Kir) and captured Torride in a hard-fought action lasting 15 minutes. Torride had a crew of 70 men under the command of lieutenant de vaisseau Martin Bedat (or Bedar), and was armed with three 18-pounder guns and four swivel guns. Despite fire from the castle, the British suffered only two men wounded, including Lieutenant William Debusk, who led the attack; the French suffered four men killed, and ten wounded, including Bedat. Captain Thomas Foley of Goliath sent Bedat ashore under a flag of truce. Several French prisoners escaped by jumping overboard and swimming ashore.

=== French account ===
French Adjutant-general Escale, in a letter to General Kléber, states that if one did not know the facts of Torride's capture one would have thought that treason had to have been involved. She had no watch, no guards, the crew was asleep, and the wicks from which the guns could be lit were not lighted. The crew was able to fire only three gun shots before the British boarding party was already on board. Her captain redeemed himself by fighting bravely, sustaining eight wounds. In a letter dated 4 September, Napoleon wrote to General Menou that he was not surprised at what had happened with Torride. Recent developments (i.e., the Battle of the Nile), had eroded navy morale, and it had been stupid to have left her in such an exposed position.

In a letter dated 11 January 1799 Napoleon wrote to Contre-Amiral Ganteaume that he should have the aviso Torride and a second aviso carry into Lake Bourlos the artillery for three batteries: two Gomer mortars of "12 pouces", four Gomer mortars of "8 pouces", four 24-pounder guns, two grills for heating shot, 150 cartridges per mortar, and 200 cartridges per gun. (Note: A "pouce", literally a "thumb", was an inch, though the French inch measured 2.707 cm, whereas the modern British inch measures 2.54 cm.) Apparently it had slipped Napoleon's mind that Torride was now serving the Royal Navy.

== British career ==
The British took Torride into service. She participated in the ongoing blockade of Alexandria where she apparently was under the command of Midshipman William Autridge. (Autridge was promoted to lieutenant in 1800.)

Early in March 1799 Captain Sir Sidney Smith in Tigre arrived off Alexandria, to relieve Captain Troubridge. Smith brought with him the French armed galiot Marianne, which Tigre had captured two days earlier. On 7 March, Troubridge sailed in Culloden, leaving Smith with Tigre, Theseus, Alliance, Marianne, and Torride. Smith arrived at Acre on 15 March, Theseus, which had left earlier, having arrived two days earlier.

On 18 March 1799 Torride was coming around Mount Carmel when she encountered a French flotilla consisting of a corvette and nine gun-vessels that were bringing siege guns to French forces marching to capture Acre. They captured Torride.

However, within hours, Smith was able to intercept the flotilla, which he had been expecting. The British captured seven of the gun-vessels, including Torride.

Smith immediately put the guns and supplies on the gun vessels to use to help the denizens of the city resist the French, and the gun-vessels to harass them.

Smith anchored Tigre and Theseus, one on each side of the town, so their broadsides could assist the defence. The gun-vessels were of shallower draft and so could come in closer. Together, they helped repel repeated French assaults.

On 21 March the gun-vessels supported the boats of Tigre and Theseus in their unsuccessful attempt to cut out four sailing lighters from the port of Caïffa. The lighters had arrived on the 18th from Alexandria and had brought supplies for the French army.

The French attacked multiple times between 19 March and 10 May before Napoleon finally gave up. On 21 May he destroyed his siege train and retreated back to Egypt, having lost 2,200 men dead, 1,000 of them to the plague. After Napoleon's failure at Acre, Smith sailed with his squadron on 12 June. He proceeded first to Beruta road, and then to Larnica road, Cyprus, in order to refit his little squadron. He and Tigre then departed for Constantinople; Alliance and the gun-vessels remaining in the theatre.

In September 1800 Torride was listed as being on the Lisbon, Gibraltar, and Mediterranean station. She was last listed in 1802.
