= HMS Goliath (1781) =

74-gun Royal Navy ship of the line

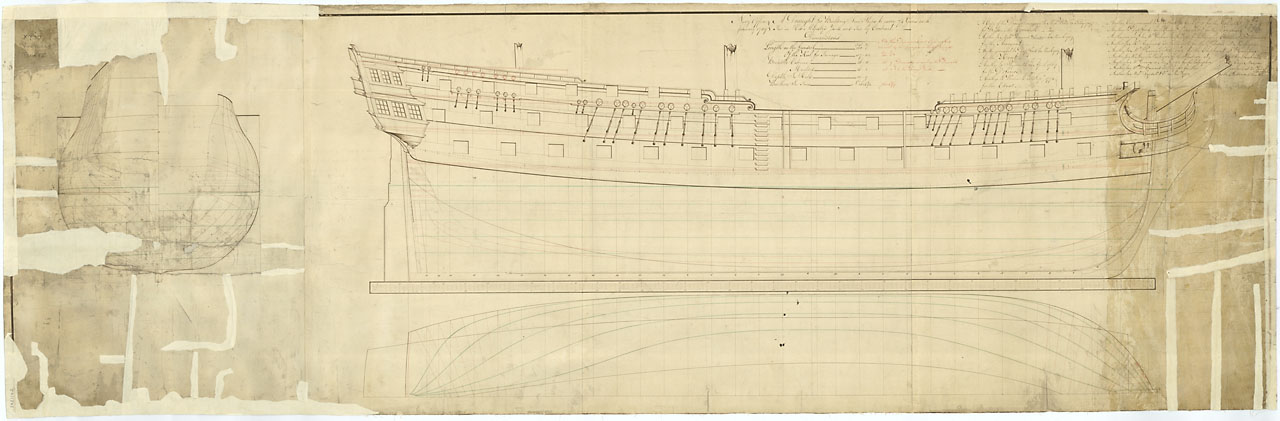
- Goliath

History

Great Britain
- Name: HMS Goliath
- Ordered: 21 February 1778
- Builder: Deptford Dockyard
- Laid down: 10 April 1779
- Launched: 19 October 1781
- Honours and awards: Naval General Service Medal with clasps: "St. Vincent"; "Nile"
- Fate: Broken up, 1815

General characteristics
- Class & type: Arrogant-class ship of the line
- Tons burthen: 1604 bm
- Length: 168 ft (51 m) (gundeck)
- Beam: 46 ft 9 in (14.25 m)
- Depth of hold: 19 ft 9 in (6.02 m)
- Propulsion: Sails
- Sail plan: Full-rigged ship
- Complement: 584 officers and men
- Armament: Gundeck: 28 × 32-pounder guns; Upper gundeck: 28 × 18-pounder guns; QD: 14 × 9-pounder guns; Fc: 4 × 9-pounder guns

HMS Goliath was a 74-gun third-rate ship of the line in the Royal Navy. She was built by Adam Hayes at Deptford Dockyard and launched on 19 October 1781. She was present at the Battle of Cape St Vincent, Battle of the Nile, and Battle of Copenhagen. She was broken up in 1815.

== French Revolutionary Wars ==
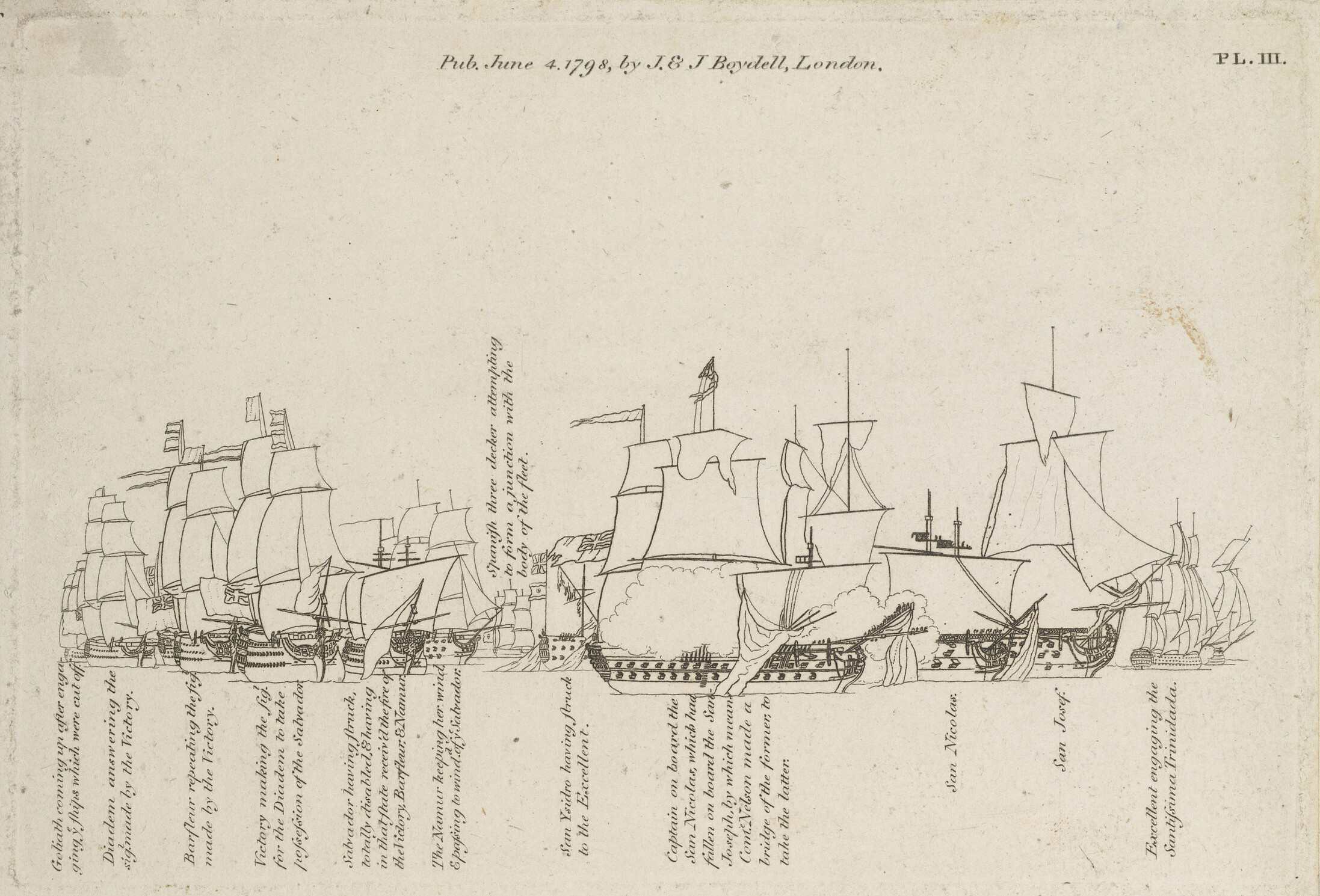
Goliath at Cape St Vincent, 1797

She is recorded as entering Portsmouth Harbour on 24 September 1785. She is also recorded as being at the Tagus on 21 December 1796, when the Mediterranean Fleet arrived, and sailed from there on the following 20 January with a Portuguese convoy. On 6 February, she was joined off Cape St Vincent by a squadron detached from the Channel Fleet, and was present with it at Jervis's action against the Spanish on 14 February 1797. She was commanded during that action by Captain Charles H. Knowles, and lost only eight wounded and none killed. However, Jervis called Knowles 'an imbecile, totally incompetent; the Goliath no use whatever under his command,' and so after the battle Knowles was ordered to exchange ships with Captain Thomas Foley of Britannia. Foley restored Goliath to order whilst Britannia slid under Knowles.

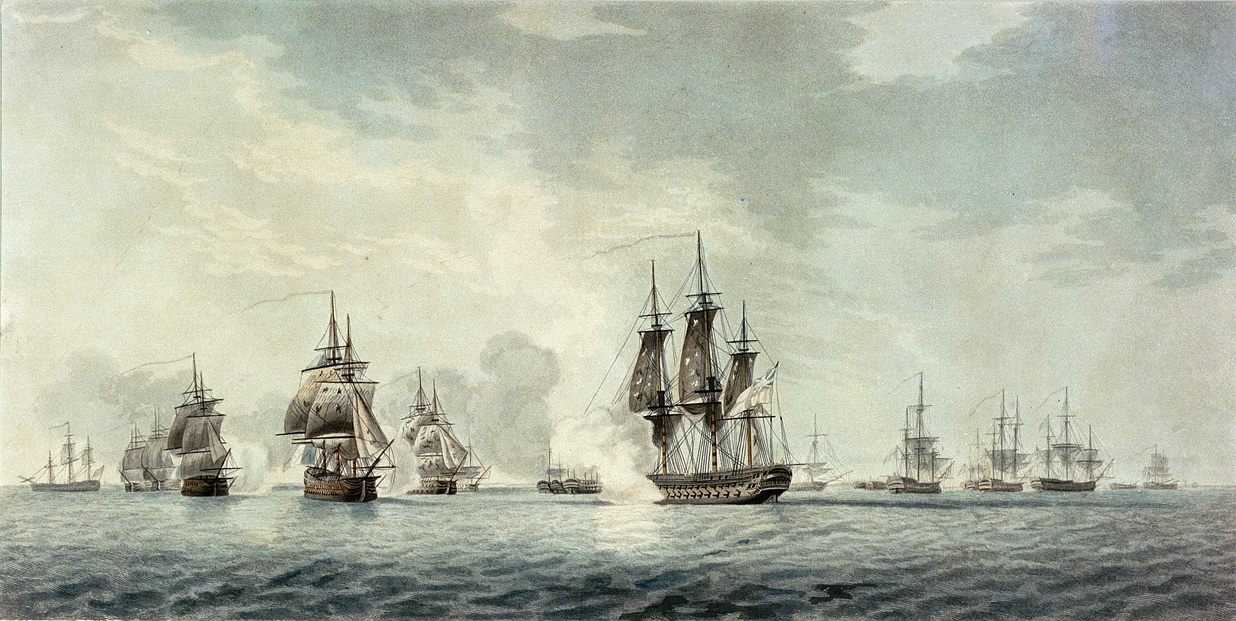
Goliath (centre) at the Battle of the Nile, 1798

She then sailed on 31 March 1797 from Lisbon to blockade (and, on 3 July), bombard Cádiz. She sailed away from the Cádiz area on 24 May 1798 with a squadron of 10 ships of the line to join Nelson's squadron in the Mediterranean in searching for the French fleet transporting Bonaparte to Egypt, arriving with them on 7 June. She was thus present at the Battle of the Nile on 1 August, at which Foley deduced that there was enough room to sail between the shore and the stationary anchored French ships. Four other ships followed, and it was this move that can be said to have won the battle. After it, on 19 August, she and Zealous, Swiftsure, Seahorse, Emerald, Alcmene, and Bonne Citoyenne left Aboukir Bay to cruise off the port of Alexandria. There, on 25 August, her boats captured the French armed ketch Torride from under the guns of Abukir Castle; the Royal Navy took Torride into service. Goliath then remained stationed off Alexandria until at least the end of 1798.

== Napoleonic Wars ==
On 27 June 1803, during the Blockade of Saint-Domingue, Goliath sent out a boat that captured a small French schooner that had been on her way from Santiago de Cuba to Port-au-Prince, with a cargo of sugar and $3,476 in cash. The schooner was armed with three carriage guns and some swivel guns.

The next day, Goliath sailed inshore off Cape Nicholas Mole, Haiti, to try to find two vessels seen earlier. In the action of 28 June 1803, she encountered and after a few shots captured the ship-corvette Mignonne, which the British navy took into service under her French name. In Brisbane's words, Mignonne was a "remarkable fast sailing Ship Corvette". She carried sixteen long 18-pounder guns, six of which she had landed. Her crew of only 80 men was under the command of Monsieur J. P. Bargeaud, Capitaine de Fregate, and she was two days out of Les Cayes, sailing to France via the Cape.

On 6 December 1803, Goliath recaptured the Liverpool ship Rachael. After arbitration Goliath had to share the prize money with HMS Defiance.

As the slave ship Diamond was returning from Havana on 9 August 1803 she encountered the French privateer Bellona, which took her captive. However, Goliath recaptured Diamond on the 12th and sent her into The Downs.

In May 1805, Goliath was in the Channel Fleet. On 15 August Goliath spotted four vessels, one to eastward and three to westward. Goliath sailed east and joined Camilla, which was in pursuit of the French brig-corvette Faune. Goliath then helped Camilla to capture Faune.

On the same day Raisonnable joined Goliath and the two set out after the three sails, which were the French 44-gun frigate Topaze, the corvettes Department-des-Landes and Torche. Goliath subsequently captured Torche, which was under the command of M. Dehen, and carried 18 guns and a crew of 196 men. She also had on board as prisoners 52 men from Blanche. The French flotilla had captured Blanche on 19 July, some 150 miles north of Puerto Rico. The Royal Navy took Torche, which was a sister-ship to Mignonne, into service as HMS Torch, but never commissioned her.

On 26 July 1807, Goliath sailed as a part of a fleet of 38 vessels for Copenhagen and was present from 15 August to 20 October that year for the siege and bombardment of Copenhagen and the capture of the Danish Fleet by Admiral Gambier. She was present from May to October 1808 in the Baltic with a fleet under Vice-Admiral Sir J Saumarez, being chased on 19 August by the Russian fleet in Hango Bay. On 30 August she joined Centaur, Implacable and the Swedish fleet blockading the Russians in the port of Rogerswick.

== Fate ==
She finally sailed for home, heading for The Downs, arriving in Portsmouth on 25 July 1813 and then departing only 15 days later with the West Indies convoy. Calling at Falmouth on 15 August, and Cork, she escorted the convoy across the Irish Sea and then headed back to Portsmouth, arriving on 14 August 1814, The Downs a day later, and then the naval base at Chatham, where, on 3 October 1814, she was paid off. She was broken up the following year.

== Notable commanders ==
- Sir Hyde Parker 1781 to 1786
- Archibald Dickson 1786 to 1789
- Andrew Snape Douglas 1789/90
- Charles Henry Knowles 1796/7
- Thomas Foley 1797 to 1799
- William Essington 1801/2
- Charles Brisbane 1802 to 1805
- Peter Puget 1807/8
