= HMS Camilla (1776) =

Royal Navy 20-gun post ship

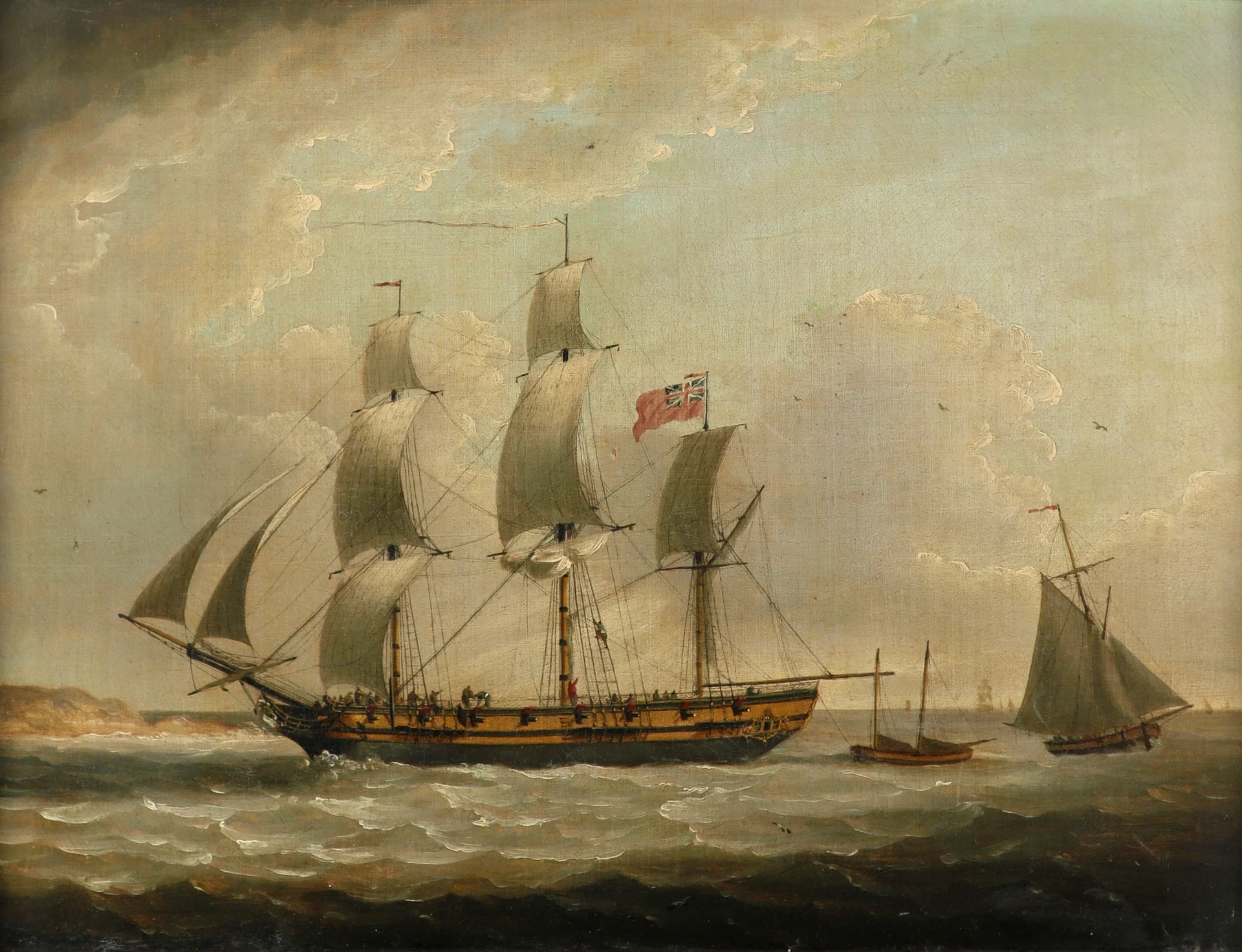
- 1796 painting of Camilla

History

Great Britain
- Name: HMS Camilla
- Ordered: 15 April 1773
- Builder: Chatham Dockyard
- Laid down: May 1774
- Launched: 20 April 1776
- Completed: 9 July 1776
- Commissioned: May 1776
- Fate: Sold 1831

General characteristics
- Class & type: Sphinx-class post ship
- Tons burthen: 432 56/94 (bm)
- Length: 108 ft 1 1/4 in (33.0 m) (gundeck); 89 ft 10 3/8 in (27.4 m) keel
- Beam: 30 ft 1 in (9.2 m)
- Depth of hold: 9 ft 8 in (2.9 m)
- Sail plan: Full-rigged ship
- Complement: 140 (134 from 1794)
- Armament: Upper deck: 20 × 9-pounder guns; From 1794, she additionally carried 6 × 24-pounder carronades, (2 on her forecastle + 4 on her quarterdeck)

HMS Camilla was a 20-gun Sphinx-class post ship of the Royal Navy. Camilla was built in Chatham Dockyard to a design by John Williams and was launched in 1776. She served in the American Revolution, the French Revolutionary Wars, and the Napoleonic Wars, before being sold in 1831.

== American Revolution ==
Camilla was commissioned in May 1776 and sailed for North America in August. There she captured the privateer schooner Independence, John Gill, Master, of six carriage guns, eight swivels, and 50 men. She was on a cruise from Boston. (Note: This is not the Massachusetts State Navy brig Independence that Hope captured in November 1776.) Camilla also captured Admiral Montague, sailing from Hispaniola to Rhode Island with a cargo of molasses and coffee, Chance sailing to Georgia with coffee, and Polly, sailing to Surinam in ballast.

On 23 January 1777, 12 miles (19 km) north of Charlestown, South Carolina, Camilla, under Captain Charles Phipps, captured the American sloop Fanny, which was heading to that port from Cap-Français, Hispaniola, with a cargo of molasses. Then in February Captain John Linzee took command of Camilla.

On 20 February 1777, Camilla and Perseus, Captain George Keith Elphinstone, captured the 170-ton snow, Adventure. They captured her 99 miles (159 km) northeast of Antigua, British West Indies, as she was going from Newburyport, Massachusetts, to St. Eustatius, Netherlands West Indies, with a cargo of fish, staves, spermacaeti candles and pine planks. Camilla fired eleven shots before Adventure would stop. Perseus and Camilla shared the prize money. Eight days later, Camilla captured Ranger, William Davies, Master, which was sailing in ballast from St. Lucia. Fanny, Adventure, and Ranger were all condemned and sold at Antigua.

April 1777 was a busy month for Camilla. On 6 April she captured the brig Willing Maid, bound from St. Thomas, Danish West Indies, to Ocracoke Inlet, North Carolina, with a cargo of sugar, rum, and salt. However, the brig sprang a leak and sank. On 11 April 1777, Camilla was patrolling with the 44-gun frigate Roebuck near the mouth of the Delaware River, just north of the Cape Henlopen lighthouse, when they came upon the American merchantman Morris. Gunfire from the two British vessels drove Morris ashore, where she suddenly blew up with such force that it shattered the windows on the British vessels. Reports indicate that Morris was carrying 35 tons of gunpowder and that the captain and six crewmen still on the vessel were laying a train of gunpowder to blow her up, when things went wrong. It is not clear whether the powder train burnt too quickly or a shot from Camilla or Roebuck set it off. What is clear is that the vessel disintegrated and all aboard her died in the explosion. Much of her cargo of arms was, however, salvageable, and Americans onshore were able to get it.

On 15 and 20 April Camilla took two more prizes that were carrying rum, molasses and sugar, and molasses, respectively, but there are no details available. On 21 April, she captured Perfect, Etienne Codnet, Master, bound from Cape Nichola, Hispaniola, with a cargo of molasses. Then on 25 and 26 April she took two more unknown vessels, both carrying rum and rice. She also captured Fonbonne, W. De Gallet, master, and W. Galley, owner, which was sailing from Cap-Français to Miquelon with a cargo of wine and molasses.

In July 1777, boats from Camilla and Pearl captured and burnt the Continental schooner Mosquito.

Camilla captured several merchantmen in late 1777 or early 1778. On 15 November she captured the sloop Admiral Montague, sailing from Hispaniola to Rhode Island with a cargo of molasses and coffee. That same day, she captured Chance, Thomas Bell, master, which was sailing to Georgia with a cargo of flour and rum. Lastly, on 14 March 1778, Camilla captured Polly, William Thompson, master, which was sailing to Surinam in ballast.

When Philadelphia fell to the British in 1777, several American vessels found themselves trapped between the city and the British fleet further down the Delaware River. The Americans launched some three fire ships towards the British, but gunfire from Roebuck, Camilla, and other British vessels caused the Americans to set their ships on fire too soon, and to abandon them. British boats were able to pull the fire ships on shore where they could do no harm.

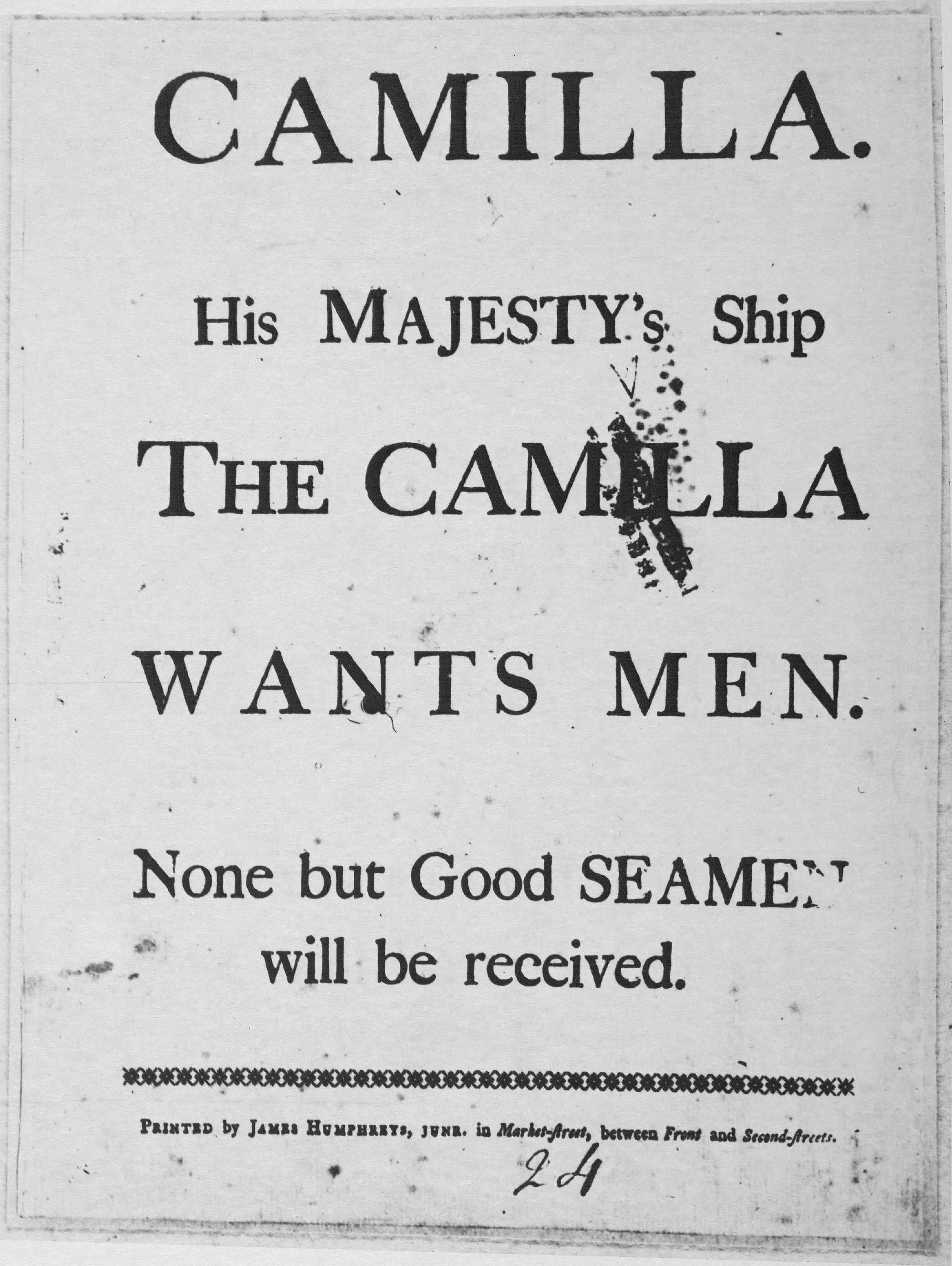
Recruiting poster from 1778 for Camilla

In February 1778 Captain John Collins took command of Camilla. On 18 March, 1778 boats from HMS Pearl and Camilla (now captained by Charles Phipps), captured the Pennsylvania Navy's armed boat Fame (A.K.A. No. 71), up a creek above Reedy Point. Fame was armed with one 4-pounder cannon, four swivel guns, and two wall guns; she had a crew of 12 men under the command of Joseph Wade. Camilla then participated in two operations, one at Newhaven on 5 July and another at Penobscot from 21 July to 14 August.

On 29 May 1779, Camilla was part of Admiral George Collier's small flotilla that sailed up the Hudson River and captured Stony Point, two months later the site of the American victory in the Battle of Stony Point. Amongst other services, she exchanged fire with Fort Lafayette.

That summer, the British Fleet moved north. Camilla was one of the vessels that participated in Tryon's raid on New Haven, Connecticut, in July.

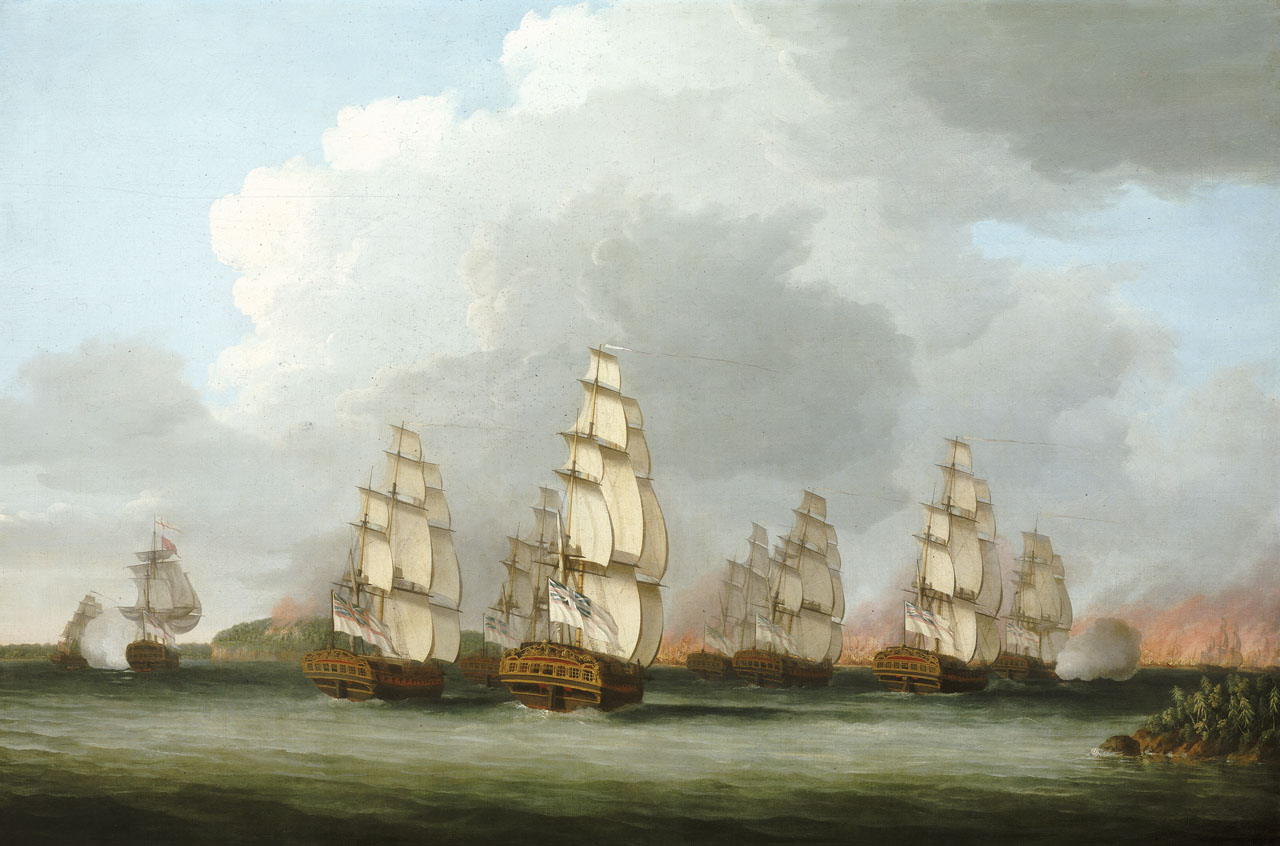
Destruction of the American Fleet at Penobscot Bay by Dominic Serres, 1779

Camilla then participated in the battle on 13–14 August, when Collier's squadron destroyed the American Penobscot Expedition. She was amongst the vessels that shared the prize money for the capture of the American privateer Hunter.

During the autumn Camilla captured the brig Chance, John M'Kay Master, off Cape Cod. The brig was sailing from St. Eustatius to Connecticut with a cargo of salt. Around this time she also recaptured the Mackerel and Marquis of Rockingham. On 12 October she captured the brig Revenge.

In December Camilla sailed from New York to Charleston, South Carolina, with Vice Admiral Mariot Arbuthnot's squadron. Thus, spring 1780, found Camilla, Captain Charles Phipps, participating at the Siege of Charleston. The city capitulated on 11 May. Camilla shared in the prize money resulting from the naval captures.

On 30 September, Camilla participated in the capture of the brigs Wasp, Potomack, and Portsmouth Hero, and the schooners Providence, Fanny and Betsey. Then on 1 November she took the schooner Henrico.

On 19 April 1781, Camilla took the sloop Ann. Camilla then sailed to join the Downs squadron. Captain J. Wainwright assumed command in November 1782. She was paid off in March 1783.

== Between the wars ==
Commander John Hutt of Trimmer received promotion to post captain and then in March 1783 recommissioned Camilla. He sailed her for Jamaica on 11 May 1783. While she was on the Jamaica station a mutiny occurred aboard Camilla. Five men received 800 lashes. Camilla sailed back to Britain in 1784, but in December sailed for Jamaica again.

In September 1790, Camilla was reported to have brought the Duke of Sudermania from Finland to the Swedish Royal Court at Drottningholm Palace.

== French Revolutionary Wars ==
In March 1794 commissioned Camilla for the Downs station. After receiving promotion to post-captain on 31 October 1795, Richard Dacres was appointed to command Camilla, which formed part of Richard Strachan's squadron in the English Channel.

On 10 June 1795 two vessels came into Yarmouth. Both had been detained by Camilla, and both had been sailing from Copenhagen. The two were Catherine and Eliza, Sass, master, and Three Brothers, Peters, master.

On 15 February 1796 Camilla ran down and sank the merchant vessel Unity, of Hull, off the Goodwin Sands. Unity was on a voyage from South Shields to Lisbon.

Camilla shared with Diamond, Syren, Magicienne, and Childers in the proceeds of the capture on 10 April 1796 of Smuka Piga. Then Camilla, Aquilon, Diamond, Minerva, Syren, Magicienne, and Childers shared in the capture on 29 April of Mary. On 24 December Melampus, Latona, Camilla and the hired armed cutter Grand Falconer, shared in the capture of Esperance.

On 20 February 1797, Camilla captured Heros. In March Captain Stephen Poyntz replaced Dacres. The next month, on 19 April, Diamond, Minerva, Cynthia, Grand Falconer, and Camilla captured the American ship Favourite, which was carrying a cargo of flour. Then on 20 May, Camilla captured Jeanie.

When Robert Larkan took command of Camilla in September 1797, he brought with him Richard Spencer, who would go on to be knighted, and become Government Resident in Albany, Western Australia. On 6 November, Camilla took Marianne.

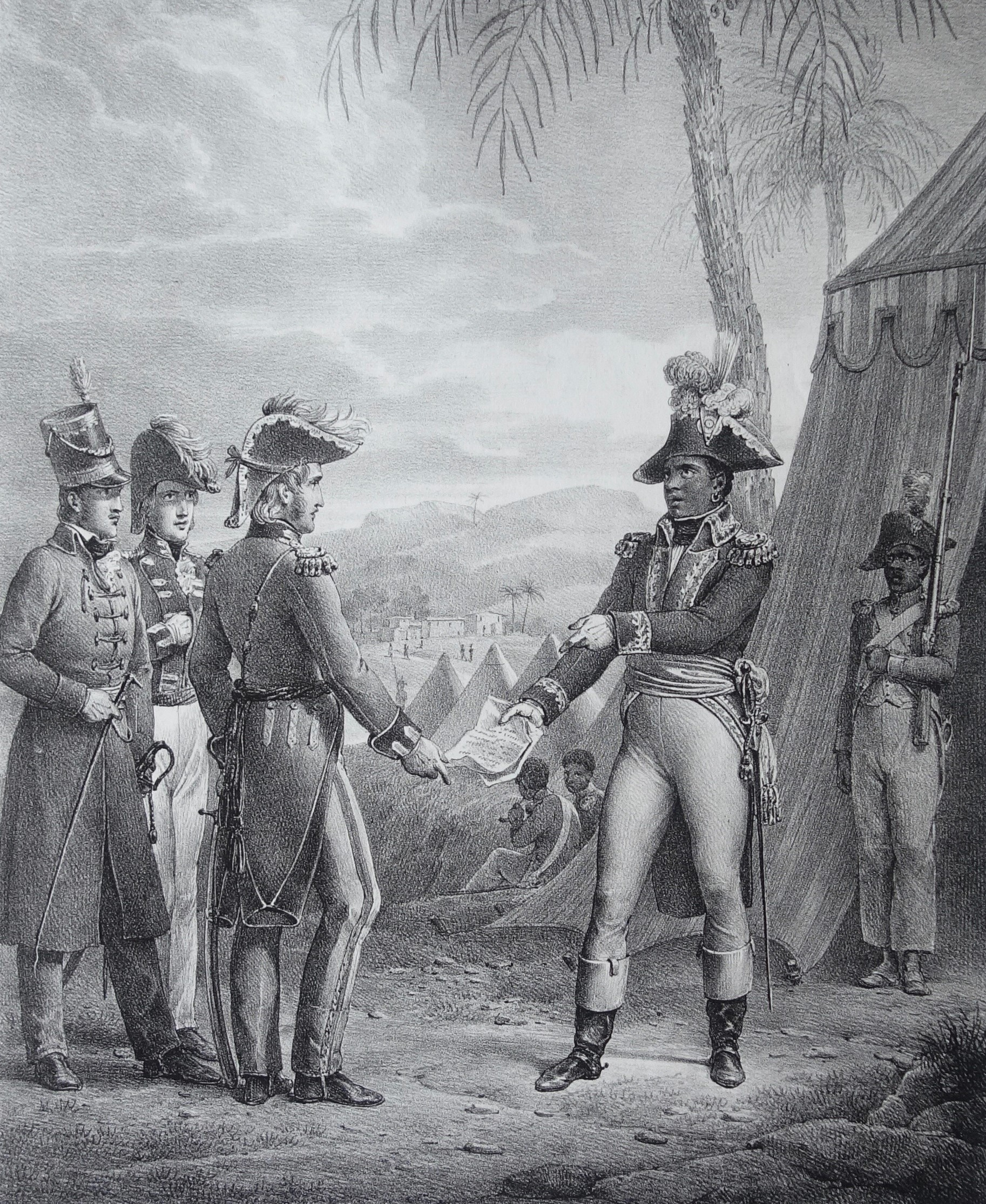
Generals Thomas Maitland and Toussaint Louverture meet to discuss a secret treaty, unknown artist, c.1800

On 4 May 1799, after a three-week voyage from Philadelphia, Camilla arrived at Cap-Français, Haiti, with the British General, Thomas Maitland on board. The British government had empowered him to pledge its support to General Toussaint Louverture.

In January 1800 Camilla managed to take three prizes. On 6 January she took Jeune Aimie. Then six days later she captured Speculation, with the hired armed cutter Fly in sight.

During the evening of 29 January 1800, off Le Havre, Camilla captured the French privateer lugger Vigoureaux (or Vigoreaux). Vigoureaux was armed with three guns, had a crew of 26 men and was 19 days out of Cherbourg, not having taken anything. HM hired armed cutter Duchess of York was in sight.

Then on 15 March Camilla left Portsmouth as escort to a convoy for Newfoundland.

Later that year Camilla lost her mainmast in a storm while accompanying a convoy from Newfoundland to Britain. Though the storm scattered the convoy, Camilla arrived in Portsmouth, having found and escorted six vessels to Weymouth and Poole. In December 1801 Captain E. Brace replaced Larkan, only to be superseded in 1802 by Captain Henry Hill. Hill sailed Camilla from Portsmouth for Newfoundland on 29 July; she returned to Portsmouth on 29 November.

== Napoleonic Wars ==
Captain C. Woolaston briefly replaced Hill. Then in April 1803 Captain Brydges Watkinson Taylor took command of Camilla. In May he sailed for Newfoundland.

On 15 August 1805, Camilla captured the French navy's brig-corvette Faune, of 16 guns and 98 men. Camilla chased Faune for nine hours before capturing her at 45°18′N 7°36′W. The 74-gun, third rate Goliath had seen three sail and joined the chase, helping Camilla to capture Faune. The Royal Navy took Faune into service as HMS Fawn.

Goliath, with Raisonnable in company, then sailed off to capture the French ship-corvette Torche on the next day. In December 1805, Taylor moved to Thames, a new frigate, and Captain Clotworthy Upton replaced him. In March 1806 Captain J. Tower replaced Upton.

Between May 1807 and 1808 Camilla was in the Leeward Islands under the command of Captain John Bowen, who had taken command in July 1806. On 2 March 1808, a party of about 200 marines and sailors from Cerberus, Circe, and Camilla, all under the command of Captain Pigot of Circe, landed near Grand Bourg on the island of Marie-Galante. The militia on the island quickly surrendered, together with their 13 guns, plus small arms and gunpowder. Neither side suffered any casualties. In 1825 the crews of Ulysses, Cerberus, Circe, and Camilla shared in the prize money arising out of the island's surrender. (Note: A first-class share of the prize money paid in 1825 was worth £311 0s 5d; a fifth-class share, in 1808 that of a seaman, was worth £1 13s 3½d.)

Between 30 July and August 1809 Camilla was one of the many vessels participating in the debacle of the Walcheren Campaign. On 3 November, Camilla, under temporary captain William Henry Dillon, encountered the Drie Gebroeders. She was sailing from Norway under a Danish master and with a cargo of timber. On her deck were a number of wooden trucks for gun-carriages, which were obviously war material. The master stated that he was taking his cargo to Britain so Dillon let him proceed. After two hours, the merchant vessel was plainly heading toward the Dutch coast so Dillon caught up with the vessel and seized it. The master claimed that he was sailing toward Holland only to avoid "the Lemon and Oar", a dangerous reef in the North Sea. Dillon knew that the master's explanation was inconsistent with the vessel's position and so sent the vessel to Britain as a prize.

== Final years ==
Camilla was laid up in ordinary at Sheerness in December 1809, and then used as a floating breakwater. From 1814 to 1825 she served as a receiving ship until she was "laid aground for the protection of the waters".

The "Principal Officers and Commissioners of His Majesty's Navy" offered "Lying at Sheerness, Camilla, of 433 tons", for sale on 13 April 1831. She sold on that day.
