= List of ship launches in 1795 =

The list of ship launches in 1795 includes a chronological list of some ships launched in 1795.

Date	Ship	Class	Builder	Location	Country	Notes
7 January	Immortalité	Romaine-class frigate		Brest	France	For French Navy.
January	Xenophon	Brig	H. Rudd	Monkwearmouth	Great Britain	For private owner.
7 February	Brunswick	Merchantman	Francis Hurry	Howden	Great Britain	For private owner.
12 March	Impatiente	Romaine-class frigate		Lorient	France	For French Navy.
17 March	Formidable	Tonnant-class ship of the line	Jean-Jacques Abauzir	Toulon	France	For French Navy.
21 March	Rattler	Sloop-of-war	Thomas Raymond	Southampton	Great Britain	For Royal Navy.
6 April	Cirencester	East Indiaman	John Randall	Rotherhithe	Great Britain	For British East India Company.
15 April	Tickler	Conquest-class gunbrig	Hill & Mellish	Limehouse	Great Britain	For Royal Navy.
20 April	Princess of Wales	Merchantman	Thomas Haw	Stockton-on-Tees	Great Britain	For R. Webster.
April	Etna	Etna-class corvette	André-François & Joseph-Augustin Normand	Honfleur	France	For French Navy.
April	Torche	Etna-class corvette		Honfleur	France	For French Navy.
2 May	Cassard	Téméraire-class ship of the line		Lorient	France	For French Navy.
8 May	Mozdol	Kizliar-class bomb vessel	Vasily Vlasov	Kazan	Russia	For Imperial Russian Navy.
9 May	Winterton	East Indiaman	Perry & Co.	Blackwall	Great Britain	Purchased on the stocks by the Royal Navy.
17 May	Colombe	Brig	Louis-Jacques & Ozanne Normand	Cherbourg	France	For French Navy.
18 May	Tsaritsyn	Rowing frigate	Vasily Vlasov	Kazan	Russia	For Imperial Russian Navy.
20 May	Incorruptible	Romaine-class frigate		Dieppe	France	For French Navy.
May	Cérès	Etna-class corvette		Le Havre	France	For French Navy.
4 June	Dryad	Fifth rate	William Barnard	Deptford	Great Britain	For Royal Navy.
17 June	Caroline	Phoebe-class frigate	John Randall	Rotherhithe	Great Britain	For Royal Navy.
17 June	Pelican	Albatross-class sloop	John Perry	Blackwall	Great Britain	For Royal Navy.
June	Perçante	Bonne Citoyenne-class corvette		Bayonne	France	For French Navy.
4 July	Amazon	Fifth rate	Wells & Co.	Rotherhithe	Great Britain	For Royal Navy.
4 July	Lascelles	East Indiaman	Wells & Co,	Rotherhithe	Great Britain	Purchased on the stocks by the Royal Navy.
16 July	Curlew	Diligence-class brig-sloop	John Randall & Co.	Rotherhithe	Great Britain	For Royal Navy.
17 July	Eliza Ann	Merchantman	Edwards, Gillett & Larkins	Calcutta	India	For Lennox & Co.
17 July	Ville de Paris	First rate		Chatham Dockyard	Great Britain	For Royal Navy.
18 July	Affronteur	Affronteur-class lugger		Dieppe	France	For French Navy.
18 July	Earl Spencer	East Indiaman	Perry	Blackwall	Great Britain	For British East India Company.
21 July	Anna	Full-rigged ship		Bombay	India	For private owner.
21 July	Jean-Jacques Rousseau	Téméraire-class ship of the line		Toulon	France	For French Navy.
31 July	Emerald	Amazon-class frigate	Thomas Pitcher	Northfleet	Great Britain	For Royal Navy.
July	Kite	Sloop-of-war	Frances Barnard	Deptford	Great Britain	For Royal Navy.
July	Volage	Corvette		Bordeaux	France	For French Navy.
July	Seagull	Diligence-class brig-sloop	John & William Wells	Deptford	Great Britain	For Royal Navy.
1 August	Zakharii i Elisavet	Sviatoi Pyotr-class ship of the line	A. S. Katsanov	Kherson	Russia	For Imperial Russian Navy.
7 August	Vésuve	Corvette	Denise	Honfleur	France	For French Navy.
17 August	Pursuit	Merchantman	Ing. Eskdale	Whitby	Great Britain	For Atty & Co.
18 August	Schooner No. 1	Schooner		Sevastopol	Russia	For Imperial Russian Navy.
27 August	Étonnante	Etna-class corvette	Fouache & Reine	Honfleur	France	For French Navy.
29 August	Star	Albatross-class brig-sloop	John Perry	Blackwall	Great Britain	For Royal Navy.
31 August	Doris	Fifth rate	William Cleverley	Gravesend	Great Britain	For Royal Navy.
31 August	Revanche	Romaine-class frigate		Dieppe	France	For French Navy.
3 September	Sylph	Albatross-class brig-sloop	Frances Barnard	Deptford Dockyard	Great Britain	For Royal Navy.
6 September	Elisaveta	Third rate	M. Sarychev	Saint Petersburg	Russia	For Imperial Russian Navy.
10 September	Swallow	Albatross-class brig-sloop	Perry & Hanley	Blackwall	Great Britain	For Royal Navy.
12 September	Menaçente	Salamandre-class gun-corvette		Le Havre	France	For French Navy.
21 September	Berwick	Merchantman	David Glass & John Wood	Calcutta	India	For private owner.
24 September	Phoebe	Phoebe-class frigate	John Dudman	Deptford	Great Britain	For Royal Navy.
26 September	Sejeren	Third rate	Ernst Wilhelm Stibolt	Copenhagen	Denmark-Norway	For Dano-Norwegian Navy.
28 September	Viala	Téméraire-class ship of the line		Lorient	France	For French Navy.
29 September	Beaver	Sloop-of-war	Joseph Graham	Harwich	Great Britain	For Royal Navy.
30 September	Earl of Mansfield	East Indiaman	Wells & Co.	Rotherhithe	Great Britain	Purchased on the stocks by the Royal Navy.
30 September	Kangaroo	Diligence-class brig-sloop	John & William Wells	Deptford	Great Britain	For Royal Navy.
8 October	Décius	Société populaire-class corvette		Brest	France	For French Navy.
14 October	Cameleon	Diligence-class brig-sloop	John Randall	Rotherhithe	Great Britain	For Royal Navy.
14 October	Iris	Fifth rate	Ernst Wilhelm Stibolt	Copenhagen	Denmark-Norway	For Dano-Norwegian Navy.
14 October	Racoon	Diligence-class brig-sloop	John Randall	Rotherhithe	Great Britain	For Royal Navy.
15 October	Mignonne	Corvette	Pierre Ozanne, and Jean-François Lafosse	Cherbourg	France	For French Navy.
21 October	Guillaume Tell	Third rate	Jean-Jacques Abauzir	Toulon	France	For French Navy.
29 October	Coverdale	Merchantman	Fishburn & Brodrick	Whitby	Great Britain	For Norrison Coverdale.
19 November	Schooner No. 2	Schooner		Sevastopol	Russia	For Imperial Russian Navy.
24 November	Diligence	Diligence-class brig-sloop	John Parsons	Bursledon	Great Britain	For Royal Navy.
26 November	Neptuno	Montañes-class ship of the line	Royal Dockyard	Ferrol	Spain	For Spanish Navy.
28 November	Résistance	Vengeance-class frigate		Paimbœuf	France	For French Navy.
November	Bravoure	Cocarde-class frigate		Saint-Servan	France	For French Navy.
12 December	Harriet	Merchantman	Mackenzie	Calcutta	India	For private owner.
12 December	Maidstone	Maidstone-class frigate	Thomas Pollard	Deptford Dockyard	Great Britain	For Royal Navy.
15 December	Dispatch	Albatross-class brig-sloop	Samuel Nicholson	Chatham	Great Britain	For Royal Navy, but sold to Imperial Russian Navy before commissioning.
29 December	Bacchante	Serpente-class corvette	Jacques, Nicholas & Pierre Fortier	Honfleur	France	For French Navy.
30 December	Albatross	Albatross-class sloop	Charles Ross	Rochester	Great Britain	For Royal Navy.
December	Harmonie	Virginie-class frigate		Bordeaux	France	For French Navy.
Unknown date	Abercromby	Merchantman	Foreman & Bacon	Calcutta	India	For Fairlie & Co.
Unknown date	Alert	East Indiaman		Bombay	India	For British East India Company.
Unknown date	Archimede	Third rate	Antonio Imbert	Castellamare del Golfo	Kingdom of Sicily	For Royal Sicilian Navy.
Unknown date	Ariadne	Slave ship		Newbury, Massachusetts	United States	For private owner.
Unknown date	Atkinson	Sloop	Nicholas Bools	Bridport	Great Britain	For James Atkinson, Jenny Tucker and others.
Unknown date	Bahr-i Amik	Fifth rate			Ottoman Empire	For Ottoman Navy.
Unknown date	Battalion	Merchantman	John Barry	Whitby	Great Britain	For private owner.
Unknown date	Bermuda	Brig-sloop		Bermuda	(Kingdom of Great Britain) Bermuda	For Royal Navy.
Unknown date	Betsey	Merchantman	John & Philip Laing	Sunderland	Great Britain	For Mr. Caithness.
Unknown date	Brunswick	Merchantman		Howden	Great Britain	For Hurry & Co.
Unknown date	Caledonia	Merchantman		Calcutta	India	For private owner.
Unknown date	Chichester	Full-rigged ship			India	For Blake & Co.
Unknown date	Dove	Merchantman	John & Philip Laing	Sunderland	Great Britain	For private owner.
Unknown date	Earl of Chesterfield	Cutter	Nicholas Bools	Bridport	Great Britain	For James Wood.
Unknown date	Embuscade	Fifth rate		Rotterdam	Batavian Republic	For Batavian Navy.
Unknown date	Fama	Fifth rate		Cartagena	Spain	For Spanish Navy.
Unknown date	Fram	Collier		Monkwearmouth	Great Britain	For private owner.
Unknown date	Franklin	Brig		Philadelphia, Pennsylvania	United States	For private owner.
Unknown date	Galathe	Brig		Rotterdam	Batavian Republic	For Batavian Navy.
Unknown date	Galgo	Corvette	Royal Dockyard	Ferrol	Spain	For Spanish Navy.
Unknown date	Giasone	Brig			Republic of Venice	For Venetian Navy.
Unknown date	Hannah	Slave ship		Liverpool	Great Britain	For Robert Bent.
Unknown date	Isidor	Iaroslav-class ship of the line	G. Ignatyev	Arkhangelsk	Russia	For Imperial Russian Navy.
Unknown date	Tapageuse	Brig-corvette		Bayonne	France	For French Navy.
Unknown date	Leander	Merchantman	Thomas Hearn	North Shields	Great Britain	For private owner.
Unknown date	London Packet	Sloop	Nicholas Bools & William Good	Bridport	Great Britain	For Simon Lee and others.
Unknown date	Maria	Merchantman		Plymouth	Great Britain	For J. Potts.
Unknown date	Minerva	West Indiaman		Lancaster	Great Britain	For Danson & Co.
Unknown date	Ninfa	Fifth rate		Mahón	Spain	For Spanish Navy.
Unknown date	Otter	Merchantman		Amesbury, Massachusetts	United States	For Ebenezer Dorr.
Unknown date	Princess Royal	Merchantman	John & Philip Laing	Sunderland	Great Britain	For W. Wheatley.
Unknown date	Queen	Merchantman			(Kingdom of Great Britain) Lower Canada	For Stewart & Co.
Unknown date	Rachel	Brig		Bristol	Great Britain	For Mr. Prothero.
Unknown date	Selabetnüma	Sixth rate	Jacques Balthazar Brun de Sainte-Catherine	Constantinople	Ottoman Empire	For Ottoman Navy.
Unknown date	Sirène	Coquille-class frigate		Bayonne	France	For French Navy.
Unknown date	Suffolk	Merchantman	Shields	Newcastle upon Tyne	Great Britain	For private owner.
Unknown date	Trojan	Merchantman		Newcastle upon Tyne	Great Britain	For French Navy.
Unknown date	Walsingham	Packet boat	Hill & Mellish	Limehouse	Great Britain	For General Post Office.
Unknown date	Name unknown	Merchantman			France	For private owner.
Unknown date	William	Full-rigged ship		Monkwearmouth	Great Britain	For private owner.
Unknown date	Name unknown	Merchantman			Batavian Republic	For private owner.
Unknown date	Name unknown	Merchantman			France	For private owner.
Unknown date	Name unknown	Merchantman			Spain	For private owner.
Unknown date	Name unknown	Merchantman		Philadelphia, Pennsylvania	United States	For private owner.
