= List of shipwrecks in 1800 =

The list of shipwrecks in 1800 includes ships sunk, foundered, wrecked, grounded, or otherwise lost during 1800.

table of contents
1800
| Jan | Feb | Mar | Apr |
| May | Jun | Jul | Aug |
| Sep | Oct | Nov | Dec |
Unknown date

== January ==
=== 1 January ===
List of shipwrecks: 1 January 1800
| Ship | State | Description |
|---|---|---|
| Sirebsomhed | Denmark | The ship was lost on the Haisborough Sands, in the North Sea off the coast of Norfolk, Great Britain. She was on a voyage from Copenhagen to London, Great Britain. |
| Two unnamed vessels | France | War of Knives: Quasi-War: Action of 1 January 1800: Two armed row barges were sunk by gunfire by USS Experiment (United States Navy) in the Bight of Léogâne. |

=== 2 January ===
List of shipwrecks: 2 January 1800
| Ship | State | Description |
|---|---|---|
| Aurora | Great Britain | The ship was wrecked at Arbroath, Forfarshire. Her crew were rescued. |
| Britannia | Great Britain | The ship was driven ashore at South Shields, County Durham. |
| Chloe | Great Britain | The ship was driven ashore at South Shields. |
| Integrity | Great Britain | The ship was driven ashore at South Shields. |
| James | Great Britain | The sloop was driven ashore at Leith, Lothian and was wrecked. Her crew were rescued. |
| John | Great Britain | The ship was wrecked at Montrose, Forfarshire, Her crew were rescued. |
| Jupiter | Great Britain | The ship was wrecked at Rattray Head, Aberdeenshire with the loss of all hands. |
| Kitty | Great Britain | Captain Ellerby's ship was driven ashore at South Shields. |
| Kitty | Great Britain | Captain Stephenson's ship was driven ashore at the Spanish Battery, Tynemouth, Great Britain and was wrecked. Her crew were rescued. |
| Leith and Aberdeen | Great Britain | The packet ship was wrecked 2 nautical miles (3.7 km) west of Kirkcaldy, Fife with the loss of ten of the eighteen people on board. She was on a voyage from Aberdeen to Leith, Lothian and/or London. |
| Liberty | Great Britain | The ship was driven ashore at the Spanish Battery, Tynemouth and was wrecked. Her crew were rescued. |
| Two Brothers | Great Britain | The ship was wrecked at Peterhead, Aberdeenshire with the loss of all hands. |
| Pearl | Great Britain | The ship was wrecked on the coast of County Galway, Ireland. She was on a voyage from Ayr to Dublin, Ireland. |
| Rose | Great Britain | The ship was wrecked at Arbroath with the loss of all hands. |
| Tiber | Great Britain | The ship was driven ashore at South Shields. |
| Triton | Great Britain | The ship was driven ashore at the Spanish Battery, Tynemouth and was wrecked. Her crew were rescued. |
| Two Sisters | Great Britain | The ship was driven ashore at Kingsbarns, Fife with the loss of four of her five crew. |
| Venerable | Great Britain | The ship was driven ashore at the Spanish Battery, Tynemouth and was wrecked. Her crew were rescued. |

=== 3 January ===
List of shipwrecks: 3 January 1800
| Ship | State | Description |
|---|---|---|
| Alexander | Great Britain | The ship was wrecked at Montrose, Forfarshire with the loss of all hands. |
| Ann and Margaret | Great Britain | The ship was wrecked at Usan Ness, Forfarshire with the loss of all hands. |
| Betsey | Great Britain | The ship was wrecked in Montrose Bay. Her crew were rescued. |
| Betsey and Susan | Great Britain | The ship was wrecked west of Arbroath, Forfarshire. Her crew were rescued. |
| Bonny Kate | Great Britain | The ship was driven ashore and wrecked on the Isle of May, Fife with the loss of a crew member. |
| Edward | Great Britain | The brig was driven ashore at Whitburn, County Durham and was wrecked. Her crew were rescued. |
| Fortitude | Great Britain | The sloop was driven ashore at St. Andrews, Fife. Her crew survived. |
| Janet | Great Britain | The sloop was driven ashore at St. Andrews and was wrecked. Five of her crew were rescued. |
| John | Great Britain | The ship was wrecked at Bervie, Aberdeenshire with the loss of all nine crew. |
| Laurel | Great Britain | The brig was driven ashore at Sunderland, County Durham and was wrecked, Her crew were rescued. |
| Lord Salton | Great Britain | The ship was driven ashore on the Belhevie Sands, Aberdeenshire and was wrecked with the loss of all hands. |
| Martha | Great Britain | The ship was driven ashore on the Belhevie Sands with the loss of all but her captain. |
| Mary | Great Britain | The ship was wrecked at "Westhaven". Her crew were rescued. |
| Nancy | Great Britain | The ship was wrecked at Bervie. Her crew were rescued. |
| Neptune | Great Britain | The ship foundered North Sea off Nigg, Aberdeenshire with the loss of all hands. |
| Phaeton | Great Britain | The brig was wrecked near Fraserburgh, Aberdeenshire with the loss of five lives. She was on a voyage from Cayenne, French Guiana to Gothenburg, Sweden. |
| Phoenix | Great Britain | The brig was driven ashore and wrecked at Fraserburgh, Aberdeenshire with the loss of a crew member. She was on a voyage from London to Leith, Lothian. |
| Prosperous | Great Britain | The ship was wrecked at Brora, Sutherland. Her crew were rescued. |
| Rose | Great Britain | The ship was wrecked at Arbroath with the loss of all hands. |
| Stonehaven | Great Britain | The ship was driven ashore at Stonehaven, Aberdeenshire and was wrecked. Her crew were rescued. |
| Sussex | Great Britain | The ship was wrecked at Stonehaven. Her crew were rescued. |
| Swan | Great Britain | The ship was driven ashore on Coquet Island, Northumberland and was wrecked with the loss of seven of her eight crew. |
| Swallow | Great Britain | The ship was wrecked at Arbroath with the loss of all hands. |
| Unnamed | Great Britain | The sloop was driven ashore at Milton of Strathbogie, Aberdeenshire. Her crew were rescued. |
| Unnamed | Great Britain | The ship was wrecked at "Budden" with the loss of one of her three crew. |
| Unnamed | Great Britain | The brig was wrecked at Montrose with the loss of all hands. |
| Unnamed | Great Britain | The ship was driven ashore near Kinkell, Fife. Her crew were rescued. |

=== 4 January ===
List of shipwrecks: 4 January 1800
| Ship | State | Description |
|---|---|---|
| Janet | Great Britain | The ship foundered in the North Sea off Portlethen, Aberdeenshire with the loss of all hands. |
| Nile | Great Britain | The brig was driven ashore at Aberdeen and was wrecked. Her crew were rescued. |
| Stockton | Great Britain | The brig was driven ashore at Aberdeen and was wrecked. Her crew were rescued. |
| Two unnamed vessels | Great Britain | A brig and a sloop were driven ashore at Collieston, Aberdeenshire. There were ten survivors. |
| Unnamed | Great Britain | The sloop was driven ashore at Collieston with the loss of all but her captain. |

=== 5 January ===
List of shipwrecks: 5 January 1800
| Ship | State | Description |
|---|---|---|
| Betsey | Great Britain | The ship was wrecked on the Pentland Skerries with the loss of all hands. |
| Dorothy | Great Britain | The ship was driven ashore at the mouth of the River Don, Aberdeen with the loss of a crew member. |
| John | Great Britain | The ship was wrecked at Montrose, Forfarshire. Her crew were rescued. |
| HMS Mastiff | (Kingdom of Great Britain) Royal Navy | The gunboat was wrecked on the Cockle Sand, in the North Sea off the coast of Norfolk with the loss of eight of her crew. |
| Ocean | Great Britain | The ship was wrecked on Ronaldsay, Orkney Islands with the loss of four of her eleven crew. |
| Volunteer | Great Britain | The ship was wrecked at Montrose. All on board were rescued. |
| Thirteen unnamed vessels | Flags unknown | The ships were driven ashore between Bervie and Montrose. |
| Four unnamed vessels | Great Britain | The ships were driven ashore in the Bay of Lunan. |
| Nine unnamed vessels | Great Britain | The ships were driven ashore and wrecked between Arbroath, Forfarshire and St. Cyrus, Aberdeenshire with the loss of all hands. |

=== 6 January ===
List of shipwrecks: 6 January 1800
| Ship | State | Description |
|---|---|---|
| La Brucle Gucule | French Navy | The corvette was wrecked at Brest, Finistère with the loss of 167 lives. |
| Mary and Elizabeth | Great Britain | The ship ran aground off Unst, Shetland Islands. |
| Unnamed | Great Britain | The brig was driven onto the Black Middens, on the coast of County Durham. |
| Unnamed | Great Britain | The brig was driven ashore on the coast of County Durham. Her crew were rescued by a lifeboat. |

=== 7 January ===
List of shipwrecks: 7 January 1800
| Ship | State | Description |
|---|---|---|
| Augustus | Great Britain | The ship was wrecked at Rattray, Aberdeenshire. Her crew were rescued. |
| Betsey | Great Britain | The ship was driven ashore at Nigg, Aberdeenshire and was wrecked with the loss of two of her six crew. |
| Helen | Great Britain | The ship was driven ashore at Dornoch, Sutherland and was wrecked with the loss of a crew member. |
| Elizabeth | Great Britain | The sloop foundered off Ronaldsay, Orkney Islands. Her crew survived. |
| Success | Great Britain | The sloop foundered off the Pentland Skerries. Her crew survived. |
| Unnamed | Great Britain | The brig foundered off the Bay of Nigg. |
| Unnamed | Great Britain | The sloop was driven ashore and wrecked at Reseness Head, Orkney Islands. |
| Unnamed | Great Britain | The sloop was driven ashore and wrecked at Dearness, Orkney Islands. |
| Unnamed | Great Britain | The sloop was driven ashore and wrecked at Dearness. All on board were rescued. |

=== 9 January ===
List of shipwrecks: 9 January 1800
| Ship | State | Description |
|---|---|---|
| Aberdeen Packet | Great Britain | The smack was wrecked 2 nautical miles (3.7 km) west of Kirkcaldy, Fife with the loss of ten of the eighteen people on board. |
| Adventure | Great Britain | The ship was wrecked on the Buchan coast, Aberdeenshire. Her crew were rescued. She was on a voyage from London to Norway. |
| Athol | Great Britain | The ship was wrecked on the Buchan coast with the loss of all hands. |
| Janet | Great Britain | The ship was wrecked north of Aberdeen with the loss of all hands. |
| Jason | Great Britain | The ship was wrecked on the Buchan coast. Some of her crew were rescued. |
| John | Great Britain | The ship was driven ashore and wrecked at Arbroath with the loss of all nine crew. |
| Phoenix | Great Britain | The brig was wrecked on the North Esk Sandbank, 4 nautical miles (7.4 km) from Montrose, Forfarshire, with the loss of five of her eleven crew. |
| Swallow | Great Britain | The ship was wrecked at Arbroath with the loss of all hands. |
| Unnamed | Great Britain | The schooner was driven ashore and wrecked near Arbroath. |

=== 10 January ===
List of shipwrecks: 10 January 1800
| Ship | State | Description |
|---|---|---|
| Polly | Great Britain | The ship was wrecked on Brassay, Shetland Islands with the loss of a crew member. |

=== 11 January ===
List of shipwrecks: 11 January 1800
| Ship | State | Description |
|---|---|---|
| Unnamed | Great Britain | The sloop was driven ashore at "Hallgreen". Her crew were rescued. |
| Unnamed | Great Britain | The brig was driven onto the Black Rocks. Her crew were rescued. She was on a voyage from Sunderland, County Durham to London. |

=== 12 January ===
List of shipwrecks: 12 January 1800
| Ship | State | Description |
|---|---|---|
| Mary Ann | Great Britain | The brig was wrecked at Oracabeza, Jamaica with the loss of a crew member. |
| St. Andrew | Great Britain | The ship was wrecked at Oracabeza. |

=== 15 January ===
List of shipwrecks: 15 January 1800
| Ship | State | Description |
|---|---|---|
| Friendly Cædar | Great Britain | The ship departed from Angola. No further trace, presumed foundered with the loss of all hands. |
| Suwarrow | Great Britain | The ship foundered in the Atlantic Ocean off Cape Clear Island, Ireland while on a voyage from Barbados to Liverpool, Lancashire. Her crew were rescued by Kitty (Great Britain). |
| Unnamed | France | Quasi War: The ship (22 guns) was chased ashore by USS Connecticut (United States Navy) at Deseada, she was bilged and sank. |

=== 17 January ===
List of shipwrecks: 17 January 1800
| Ship | State | Description |
|---|---|---|
| Admiral Duncan | Great Britain | The ship was destroyed by fire at New York, United States. She was on a voyage from New York to Liverpool, Lancashire. |
| Aurora | Great Britain | The ship was scuttled in the North Sea off Orfordness, Suffolk. |
| Lark | Great Britain | The ship was scuttled in the North Sea off Orfordness. |
| Mentor | Great Britain | The ship was scuttled in the North Sea off Orfordness. |

=== 19 January ===
List of shipwrecks: 19 January 1800
| Ship | State | Description |
|---|---|---|
| Susannah | Great Britain | The ship was driven ashore at Gravelines, Nord, France. All on board were rescued. She was on a voyage from Newcastle upon Tyne, Northumberland to Jamaica. |

=== 21 January ===
List of shipwrecks: 21 January 1800
| Ship | State | Description |
|---|---|---|
| HMS Weymouth | (Kingdom of Great Britain) Royal Navy | The stores ship was wrecked at Porto, Portugal. Her crew were rescued. |

=== 22 January ===
List of shipwrecks: 22 January 1800
| Ship | State | Description |
|---|---|---|
| William | Ireland | The ship was in collision with another vessel and foundered while on a voyage from Cork to the West Indies. Her crew were rescued. |

=== 23 January ===
List of shipwrecks: 23 January 1800
| Ship | State | Description |
|---|---|---|
| Britannia | Great Britain | The ship was driven ashore and wrecked at Peterhead, Aberdeenshire with the loss of three of her five crew. She was on a voyage from Newhaven, Sussex to Aberdeen. |
| Lord Saltoun | Great Britain | The brig was driven ashore at Aberdeen. Her crew were rescued. |
| Peggy and Mary | Great Britain | The sloop was driven ashore at Aberdeen. Her crew were rescued. |
| William and John | Great Britain | The full-rigged ship was driven ashore and wrecked off Sandwich, Kent. She was on a voyage from Deptford, Kent to Plymouth, Devon. |

=== 24 January ===
List of shipwrecks: 24 January 1800
| Ship | State | Description |
|---|---|---|
| Bell | Great Britain | The brig was driven ashore on the Sandwich Flats. She was on a voyage from Deptford, Kent to Plymouth, Devon. She was later refloated and taken into Ramsgate, Kent. |

=== 26 January ===
List of shipwrecks: 26 January 1800
| Ship | State | Description |
|---|---|---|
| HMS Brazen | (Kingdom of Great Britain) Royal Navy | The sloop-of-war was wrecked west of Newhaven, Sussex with the loss of all but one of her 105 crew. |
| Good Intent | Great Britain | War of the Second Coalition: The ship was captured by the Dutch in the North Sea off Sunderland, County Durham and was scuttled. |
| John's Adventure | Great Britain | The ship was driven ashore at Great Yarmouth, Norfolk. Her crew were rescued. She was later refloated and taken in to Great Yarmouth. |

=== 31 January ===
List of shipwrecks: 31 January 1800
| Ship | State | Description |
|---|---|---|
| Mary | Great Britain | The ship was in collision with another vessel and foundered. Her crew were rescued. She was on a voyage from Liverpool, Lancashire to Jamaica. |

=== Unknown date ===
List of shipwrecks: Unknown date in January 1800
| Ship | State | Description |
|---|---|---|
| Albion | Great Britain | The ship was driven ashore on the Isle of Man, She was on a voyage from Liverpool, Lancashire to Dublin, Ireland. |
| Andalusia | Great Britain | The ship was driven ashore at Scarborough, Yorkshire. |
| Argo | United States | The schooner was wrecked on a reef south east of Fiji. The crew survived, however, all but two of them were killed by natives on Tongatapu. |
| Aurora | Great Britain | The ship was wrecked on Læsø, Denmark with the loss of eleven of her crew. She was on a voyage from Stockholm, Sweden to London. |
| Aurora | Great Britain | The ship was lost near Arbroath, Forfarshire. |
| Aurora | Great Britain | The ship was driven ashore on "Tollbacon". She was on a voyage from Saint Petersburgh, Russia to Hull, Yorkshire. |
| Benjamin | Great Britain | The ship foundered while on a voyage from Martinique to Liverpool. Her crew were rescued by Suffolk (Great Britain). |
| Betties & Susan | Great Britain | The ship was lost near Arbroath. |
| Bridget | Great Britain | The ship was wrecked on Læsø while on a voyage from Riga, Russia to Hull, Yorkshire. Her crew were rescued. |
| Campion | Great Britain | The ship was driven ashore at Scarborough. She was on a voyage from London to Whitby, Yorkshire. |
| Carolina | France | The ship was driven ashore and wrecked at Weymouth, Dorset, Great Britain. |
| Caroline | Denmark | The ship was driven ashore near Christiansand, Norway. She was on a voyage from Saint Thomas, Virgin Islands to Copenhagen. |
| Diamond | Great Britain | The ship was lost in Sidmouth Bay. Her crew were rescued. |
| Dione | Great Britain | The ship was wrecked on the Middle Ground, in the North Sea off the coast of Essex. Her crew were rescued. She was on a voyage from Cardiff, Glamorgan to London. |
| Dreadnought | Great Britain | The ship was lost near Lisbon. She was on a voyage from Penzance, Cornwall to Venice. |
| Duncan | Great Britain | The ship was wrecked near Warkworth, Northumberland, her crew were rescued. |
| Edward | Great Britain | The ship ran aground at Alnmouth, Northumberland. |
| Edward and Mary | Great Britain | The ship was wrecked on Møn, Denmark. She was on a voyage from Riga, Russia to Great Britain. |
| Elizabeth | Great Britain | The ship was driven on to the Bondicar Rocks, on the coast of Northumberland. |
| Endeavour | Great Britain | The ship was driven ashore near Cresswell, Northumberland. |
| Fame | Great Britain | The ship foundered in the North Sea off the coast of Scotland with the loss of all hands. |
| Fame | Great Britain | The ship foundered in the Baltic Sea. |
| Flora | Great Britain | The ship was driven ashore at Scarborough. |
| Fidelity | Great Britain | The ship was driven ashore near Bridlington, Yorkshire. |
| Fortuna | Prussia | The galliot was driven ashore and wrecked near Teignmouth, Devon, Great Britain. She was on a voyage from a French port to Königsburg. |
| Frederick | Hamburg | The ship foundered while on a voyage from Hamburg to Charleston, South Carolina, United States. |
| Friends | Great Britain | The ship was driven ashore on Mousa Island, Shetland Islands and was wrecked. Her crew were rescued. |
| Friendship | Great Britain | The ship was lost at Gibraltar. She was on a voyage from Newfoundland, British North America to Livorno, Grand Duchy of Tuscany. |
| Goodintent | Great Britain | The ship was lost near Pillau, Prussia. She was on a voyage from Danzig to Liverpool. |
| Henry | Great Britain | The ship was wrecked on the Irish coast. She was on a voyage from Liverpool to Naples, Kingdom of Sicily. |
| Hermit | Great Britain | The ship was lost at Porto, Portugal. She was on a voyage from Newfoundland to Porto. |
| Hope | Great Britain | The ship was driven ashore in "The Grounds". She was refloated. |
| Hopewell | Great Britain | The ship was driven ashore at Wells-next-the-Sea, Norfolk. She was later refloated. |
| Jane | Great Britain | The ship was lost at Porto. |
| Johannes | Flag unknown | The ship was in collision with another vessel and foundered. She was on a voyage from St. Ubes, Portugal to Cork, Ireland. |
| John and Thomas | Great Britain | The ship was driven ashore at Scarborough. |
| Kleine | Hanover | The ship was driven ashore and was damaged by ice in the Ems. She was on a voyage from Emden to London. |
| Lavinia | Great Britain | The ship was lost at Porto. She was on a voyage from London to Porto. |
| Lovely Mary | Great Britain | The ship was wrecked in Franmore Bay with the loss of four of her crew. She was on a voyage from Porto to Liverpool. |
| Mary | Great Britain | The ship was lost on the coast of Ireland. She was on a voyage from Newfoundland to Bristol, Gloucestershire. |
| Mary Ann | Great Britain | The ship was driven ashore in Dungarvan Bay. She was on a voyage from Tortola to the Clyde. |
| Meanwell | Great Britain | The ship was wrecked on the Scottish coast in early January. |
| Mona | Great Britain | The ship was driven ashore at Kinsale, County Cork, Ireland. She was on a voyage from Surinam to Liverpool. |
| Myrtle Tree | Ireland | The ship was wrecked on Lundy Island, Devon. She was on a voyage from a Baltic port to Dublin. |
| Ocean | Great Britain | The collier was wrecked at Wells-next-the-Sea. |
| Parsimonia | Great Britain | The ship foundered off Bleak Ball, Ireland. She was on a voyage from Porto to London. |
| Patience | Great Britain | The ship was driven ashore on Coxscar. She was on a voyage from Saint Petersburg, Russia to Montrose, Forfarshire or Leith, Lothian. |
| Pilgrim | Great Britain | The ship was wrecked at Cape Coast, Dutch Guinea. |
| Purissima Conception | Spain | The ship was driven ashore at Portsmouth, Hampshire, Great Britain and was wrecked. She was on a voyage from Portsmouth to London. |
| Rachel | Great Britain | The ship was wrecked at Gibraltar while on a voyage from Lisbon, Portugal to Venice. |
| Rose | Great Britain | The ship was lost near Arbroath. |
| Royal Recovery | Great Britain | The ship was driven ashore and wrecked at Elsinore, Denmark while on a voyage from Saint Petersburg to Sligo, Ireland. |
| Sailor | Great Britain | The ship was driven ashore at Margate, Kent. She was on a voyage from Seville, Spain to London. |
| Sally | Great Britain | The ship was driven ashore and wrecked on Brassay, Shetland Islands with the loss of seven of the sixteen people on board. |
| Samuel | Great Britain | The ship was driven ashore at Boulmer, Northumberland. |
| Sarah | Great Britain | The ship ran aground on the Dragal Reef. She was on a voyage from Memel, Prussia to Liverpool. |
| Shandy Hall | Great Britain | War of the Second Coalition: The ship was captured by two French Navy frigates while on a voyage from Newfoundland to Portugal. She was set afire and sunk. |
| St. John | Great Britain | The ship was driven ashore at Boulmer. |
| Success | Great Britain | The ship foundered in the Irish Sea off Dublin. She was on a voyage from Liverpool to an Irish port. |
| Swallow | Great Britain | The ship was lost near Arbroath. |
| Thetis | Great Britain | The East Indiaman foundered off the coast of Ireland while on a voyage from Bombay, India to London. Her crew were rescued by Loyalist (Great Britain). |
| Thomas and Mary | Great Britain | The ship was driven ashore in the Orkney Islands. Her crew were rescued. |
| Three Sisters | Great Britain | The ship foundered in the Atlantic Ocean. Some of her crew survived. She was on a voyage from Falmouth, Cornwall to Livorno. |
| Tonyn | Great Britain | The ship was struck by another vessel and sank at Waterford, Ireland. She was on a voyage from Jamaica to Liverpool. |
| Townley | Great Britain | The ship foundered while on a voyage from Danzig to Liverpool. Her crew were rescued. |
| Turk | Great Britain | The ship foundered in the Grand Banks of Newfoundland. |
| Underneeming | Danzig | The ship was wrecked on Bornholm, Denmark while on a voyage from Danzig to London. |
| Union | Great Britain | The ship was wrecked on Saint Tudwal's Islands, Cardiganshire while on a voyage from Greenock, Renfrewshire to New York. |
| Union | Great Britain | The ship foundered while on a voyage from Jamaica to London. Her crew were rescued. |
| Uniso | Portugal | The ship was lost at Venice. She was on a voyage from Lisbon to Venice. |
| Venus | Great Britain | War of the Second Coalition: The ship was captured by the privateer Bournonville (France). She was on a voyage from Newfoundland to Poole, Dorset. She was subsequently lost off Brest, Finistère. |
| Verwagtung | Hanover | The ship was wrecked on Bornholm while on a voyage from Riga, Russia to Emden. |
| Vigilante | Great Britain | The ship was driven ashore near Youghal, County Cork. She was on a voyage from Lisbon to Bristol. |
| Wohlfahrt | Flag unknown | The ship foundered with the loss of her captain. She was on a voyage from Porto to St. Ubes. |
| Three unnamed vessels | Great Britain | The colliers were driven ashore at Wells-next-the-Sea. They were later refloated. |
| Six unnamed vessels | Great Britain | The ships were driven ashore at Scarborough. |
| Unnamed | Flag unknown | The brig foundered at sea with the loss of all hands. |
| Unnamed | France | The ship was wrecked at Brest with the loss of 170 of the 210 people on board. Survivors were rescued by Generous Planter (Great Britain). The ship was on a voyage from Île de France to Brest. |

== February ==
=== 1 February ===
List of shipwrecks: 1 February 1800
| Ship | State | Description |
|---|---|---|
| John | United States | Quasi War: The 111 ton 2 gun commissioned private armed schooner was captured by privateer "Syrene" (France) and burned in the Atlantic Ocean (17°28′N 55°25′W). |

=== 2 February ===
List of shipwrecks: 2 February 1800
| Ship | State | Description |
|---|---|---|
| Three Brothers | Great Britain | The brig struck a rock in the Cattewater and was wrecked. She was on a voyage from Plymouth, Devon to Jamaica. |

=== 5 February ===
List of shipwrecks: 5 February 1800
| Ship | State | Description |
|---|---|---|
| James | Great Britain | The ship was wrecked on Inchcape. |

=== 6 February ===
List of shipwrecks: 6 February 1800
| Ship | State | Description |
|---|---|---|
| La Vengeance | French Navy | Quasi-War, USS Constellation vs. La Vengeance: The Vengeance-class frigate was run aground to prevent sinking at Curaçao due to damage received on 1 February in battle with the frigate USS Constellation (United States Navy). Subsequently repaired and returned to service. |

=== 15 February ===
List of shipwrecks: 15 February 1800
| Ship | State | Description |
|---|---|---|
| Bougainville | France | War of the Second Coalition: The privateer, which had been captured the previous day by HMS Amazon, collided with her and foundered with the loss of one of her 82 crew. |

=== 27 February ===
List of shipwrecks: 27 February 1800
| Ship | State | Description |
|---|---|---|
| Beaver | Great Britain | War of the Second Coalition: The schooner was captured and sunk by a French privateer. |

=== Unknown date ===
List of shipwrecks: Unknown date in February 1800
| Ship | State | Description |
|---|---|---|
| Abigail | United States | The ship was driven ashore and wrecked on Wangerooge, Hanover. Her crew were rescued. She was on a voyage from the United States to Bremen. |
| Amity | Great Britain | The ship was driven ashore and wrecked at Sunderland, County Durham. She was on a voyage from Poole, Dorset to Sunderland |
| Argos | Great Britain | The ship was wrecked on the coast of Portugal. She was on a voyage from London to St. Ubes, Portugal. |
| Aurora | Ireland | The ship was wrecked on the Strand off Slark, on the west coast of Ireland. She was on a voyage from Lisbon, Portugal to Dublin. |
| Beauty | France | Quasi War: On or about 22 February the privateer schooner was forced ashore by USS Norfolk (United States Navy) at Point Jaco, Cuba with her side shelled to pieces by Norfolk. |
| Duchess of Gordon | Great Britain | War of the Second Coalition: The ship was captured and recaptured. She was subsequently wrecked near Lisbon with the loss of all but one of her crew. |
| Ebenezer | Ireland | The ship was wrecked on the Irish coast with the loss of all hands. She was on a voyage from Bordeaux, Gironde, France to Dublin. |
| Favourite | Great Britain | The ship was driven ashore and wrecked on the Isle of Lewis. She was on a voyage from Martinique to Liverpool, Lancashire. |
| Friendship | Great Britain | The ship was lost in the Orkney Islands. She was on a voyage from London to South Shields, County Durham. |
| Fortune | Great Britain | The ship was wrecked on the coast of Denmark while on a voyage from Königsberg, Prussia to London. |
| Goodintent | Great Britain | The ship was driven ashore at North Somercotes, Lincolnshire. |
| Gunst Van Goede Vrienden | Hanover | The ship was driven ashore and wrecked in the Ems. She was on a voyage from London to Emden. |
| Hannah and Barbara | Great Britain | The ship was wrecked at Copenhagen, Denmark while on a voyage from London to Königsberg. |
| Hermit | Great Britain | The ship was wrecked at Porto, Portugal. |
| Industry | Great Britain | The ship was wrecked at Cape Espichel, Portugal. She was on a voyage from Liverpool to Cork, Ireland and Lisbon. |
| James | Great Britain | The ship was lost near Arbroath, Forfarshire. She was on a voyage from Peterhead, Aberdeenshire to London. |
| Jane | Great Britain | The ship was wrecked at Porto. |
| Jungser Carolina | Prussia | The ship was driven ashore near "Hornbeck" by ice. She was on a voyage from London to Königsberg. |
| Mayflower | Great Britain | The ship was driven ashore near Mogadore, Morocco. |
| Ocean | Great Britain | The ship was lost in the Orkney Islands. She was on a voyage from London to Sunderland. |
| Phæton | Sweden | The ship was wrecked off Fraserburgh with the loss of four lives. She was on a voyage from Cayenne, French Guinea to Stockholm. |
| Richard | Great Britain | The ship was driven ashore and wrecked at Margate, Kent. She was on a voyage from London to Calais, France. |
| Susan | (Kingdom of Great Britain) Jersey | The ship foundered. She was on a voyage from Île Madame, Charente-Maritime, France to Jersey. |
| Swerra Jedida | Flag unknown | The ship was driven ashore near Mogadore. |
| Thomas | Great Britain | The ship was wrecked on The Manacles. She was on a voyage from London to Waterford, Ireland. |
| Tom | Great Britain | War of the Second Coalition: The ship was captured by L'Eole (France). Shewas subsequently run ashore on the French coast when being chased by a Royal Navy frigate. |
| Victoria | Great Britain | The ship was wrecked at Waterford while on a voyage from St. Kitts to Liverpool. |
| Unnamed | France | Quasi-War, War of Knives: The sloop was captured by USS Experiment (United States Navy) probably on 2 or 4 February. She was transporting André Rigaud's troops. The sloop was dismantled and sunk, the prisoners were sent ashore in a barge that was in company with the sloop. |
| Four unnamed vessels | Portugal | War of the Second Coalition: The ships were captured off the coast of Africa by the French. They were destroyed. |
| Two unnamed vessels | United States | War of the Second Coalition: The ships were captured off the coast of Africa by the French. They were destroyed. |

== March ==
=== 7 March ===
List of shipwrecks: 7 March 1800
| Ship | State | Description |
|---|---|---|
| Good Intent | Great Britain | The ship was driven ashore at Great Yarmouth, Norfolk and was wrecked. Her crew were rescued. |

=== 10 March ===
List of shipwrecks: 10 March 1800
| Ship | State | Description |
|---|---|---|
| Princess Royal | Great Britain | The ship was wrecked on The Saints Rocks, off the coast of France with the loss of three lives. |
| HMS Repulse | (Kingdom of Great Britain) Royal Navy | The third rate ship of the line struck a rock in the Bay of Biscay off the Glénan Islands, Finistère, France and sank with the loss of eight of her crew. |

=== 13 March ===
List of shipwrecks: 13 March 1800
| Ship | State | Description |
|---|---|---|
| Prince | Great Britain | The ship sprang a leak and foundered in the Atlantic Ocean while on a voyage from Jamaica to Liverpool, Lancashire. Manilla (United States) rescued the crew. |

=== 17 March ===
List of shipwrecks: 17 March 1800
| Ship | State | Description |
|---|---|---|
| HMS Queen Charlotte | (Kingdom of Great Britain) Royal Navy | Queen Charlotte on fire off Livorno. The first rate ship of the line caught fire, exploded and sank in the Mediterranean Sea off Cabrera, Spain with the loss of 673 of her crew. |

=== 20 March ===
List of shipwrecks: 20 March 1800
| Ship | State | Description |
|---|---|---|
| Birch | Great Britain | The ship was wrecked at Happisburgh, Norfolk. |

=== 23 March ===
List of shipwrecks: 23 March 1800
| Ship | State | Description |
|---|---|---|
| Beausoy | Great Britain | The ship was in collision with another vessel and sank. She was on a voyage from London to Jamaica. Fourteen crew were rescued. |

=== 27 March ===
List of shipwrecks: 27 March 1800
| Ship | State | Description |
|---|---|---|
| Beaver | Great Britain | War of the Second Coalition: The schooner was captured by a French privateer and was sunk by her. |
| Nimrod | Great Britain | War of the Second Coalition: The ship was captured by a French privateer and was sunk by her. She was on a voyage from Teignmouth, Devon to Newfoundland, British North America. |

=== 30 March ===
List of shipwrecks: 30 March 1800
| Ship | State | Description |
|---|---|---|
| Edinburgh Packet | Great Britain | The smack ran aground west of the Black Rock, off Dublin, Ireland. She was refloated. |
| Rose | Great Britain | The sloop was wrecked on the Black Rock. |

=== Unknown date ===
List of shipwrecks: Unknown date in March 1800
| Ship | State | Description |
|---|---|---|
| Bird | Great Britain | The ship was wrecked off Corsica, France. She was on a voyage from Liverpool, Lancashire to Livorno, Grand Duchy of Tuscany. |
| HMS Childers | Royal Navy | The Childers-class brig-sloop struck rocks off Penmarc'h, Finistère, France and was damaged. She was taken in to Plymouth, Devon for repairs. |
| Cunningham | Great Britain | The ship was driven ashore and severely damaged at Newry, County Armagh, Ireland. She was on a voyage from Belfast, County Down, Ireland to London. |
| Dove | Great Britain | The ship ran aground on the Fairness Rock, off Margate, Kent. She was on a voyage from Poole, Dorset to London. |
| Friends Goodwill | Great Britain | The ship was driven ashore at Great Yarmouth, Norfolk. Her crew were rescued. She was later refloated and taken in to Great Yarmouth. |
| Hercules | Great Britain | The ship was driven ashore and wrecked at Weymouth, Dorset. She was on a voyage from Sunderland, County Durham to Weymouth. |
| Hope | Great Britain | The ship was wrecked near Penzance, Cornwall. She was on a voyage from Bristol, Gloucestershire to Jersey, Channel Islands. Her crew were rescued. |
| Quarto Jemaries | Portugal | War of the Second Coalition: The ship was captured and scuttled by a privateer. She was on a voyage from Porto to Galway, Ireland. |
| Thomas Grandison | Great Britain | The ship foundered off Youghall, County Cork, Ireland in early March. She may have been on a voyage from Lisbon, Portugal to London or vice versa. |

== April ==
=== 2 April ===
List of shipwrecks: 2 April 1800
| Ship | State | Description |
|---|---|---|
| Hinde | Great Britain | The ship was wrecked at Cape Finisterre, Spain with the loss of 25 of her crew. She was on a voyage from Liverpool, Lancashire to an African port. |
| Le Heureux | France | Quasi War: The sloop was sunk off Cape Tiburon, Hispaniola due to being old and leaky, after being captured 26 March by USS Boston (United States Navy). |

=== 3 April ===
List of shipwrecks: 3 April 1800
| Ship | State | Description |
|---|---|---|
| Oswego | United States | The ship was wrecked off Cape Nun in the Atlantic Ocean. Her 14 man crew made it to shore where they were captured by Arabs. Except for two black crewmen who elected to stay with the Arabs, most had been released by August. The other two changed their minds and escaped the Arabs in 1802. |

=== 6 April ===
List of shipwrecks: 6 April 1800
| Ship | State | Description |
|---|---|---|
| North Star | Great Britain | The ship was wrecked at Wexford, Ireland with the loss of all hands. |

=== 8 April ===
List of shipwrecks: 8 April 1800
| Ship | State | Description |
|---|---|---|
| Grasston Bothmer, or Graston Bothmier | Flag unknown | The ship was wrecked on the Goodwin Sands, Kent. She was on a voyage from Málaga. Spain to Helsingør, Denmark. |

=== 14 April ===
List of shipwrecks: 14 April 1800
| Ship | State | Description |
|---|---|---|
| Indiana | Flag unknown | The ship was wrecked on the Goodwin Sands, Kent. |

=== 17 April ===
List of shipwrecks: 17 April 1800
| Ship | State | Description |
|---|---|---|
| Die Gebroeders, or Twee Gebroeders | Hamburg | The ship ran aground in the Cattewater whilst on a voyage from Charleston, South Carolina, United States to Altona, Hamburg. She broke up in a gale on 21 April and was a total loss. |
| Mary | (Kingdom of Great Britain) Guernsey | The ship ran aground in the Cattewater and was wrecked. |

=== 23 April ===
List of shipwrecks: 23 April 1800
| Ship | State | Description |
|---|---|---|
| Shortland | Great Britain | The ship foundered off Maguiña while on a voyage from Jamaica to Liverpool, Lancashire. |

=== 25 April ===
List of shipwrecks: 25 April 1800
| Ship | State | Description |
|---|---|---|
| Lancaster | Great Britain | The ship departed Cork, Ireland for Savannah, Georgia, United States. No further trace, presumed foundered with the loss of all hands. |

=== Unknown date ===
List of shipwrecks: Unknown date in April 1800
| Ship | State | Description |
|---|---|---|
| Admiral Parish | Great Britain | The ship was driven ashore near Cape Henlopen, Delaware, United States. |
| Ann | Great Britain | The ship capsized in the River Tyne. She was on a voyage from Newcastle upon Tyne, Northumberland to a Baltic port. |
| Black Prince | Ireland | The ship foundered while on a voyage from Youghal, County Cork to Strangford, County Down. |
| Commerce | Great Britain | The ship foundered while on a voyage from Jamaica to Glasgow, Renfrewshire. |
| Delight | Great Britain | The ship was wrecked on the Vine Yard Sand in the North Sea while on a voyage from Gibraltar to Boston, Lincolnshire. |
| Den Goede Forventing | (Denmark) Norway | The ship foundered off the Shetland Islands, Great Britain while on a voyage from Arendal to Limerick, Ireland. Her crew were rescued. |
| Dove | Great Britain | The ship was lost at "Ivica". She was on a voyage from Falmouth, Cornwall to Livorno, Grand Duchy of Tuscany. |
| General Massena | France | The captured French privateer was driven ashore at Bassaterre Roads, St. Kitts in a gale on or before 24 April rendering her unfit to be sent to the U.S. for Prize Court. |
| Goodintent | Great Britain | War of the Second Coalition: The ship was captured, recaptured and burnt. She was on a voyage from London to Porto, Portugal. |
| Harmony | United States | The ship was driven ashore near St. Lucar, Spain. |
| L'Heureuse Recontre | France | The captured French privateer was driven ashore at Bassaterre Roads, St. Kitts in a gale on or before 24 April rendering her unfit to be sent to the U.S. for Prize Court. |
| Nancy | Great Britain | The ship was wrecked at São Miguel Island, Azores. |
| Prince John | Great Britain | The ship foundered off St. Lucia. Her crew were rescued. |
| Providence | Great Britain | The ship ran aground in the English Channel off Poole, Dorset and was wrecked. She was on a voyage from Poole to Liverpool, Lancashire. |
| Staffette | Great Britain | The ship was wrecked at Stralsund, Swedish Pomerania while on a voyage from Elbing to London. |
| St. Ann | Great Britain | The ship was lost near Sunderland, County Durham. |

== May ==
=== 5 May ===
List of shipwrecks: 5 May 1800
| Ship | State | Description |
|---|---|---|
| Observatorium (Обсерваториум) | Imperial Russian Navy | The transport ship struck underwater rocks and was beached at Kotka, Old Finland. Her crew were rescued. She was on a voyage from ru:Pitkäpaasi to Kotka. Subsequently refloated, repaired and returned to service. |
| Thomas | Great Britain | The brigantine was destroyed by fire at Plymouth, Devon with the loss of two of her nine crew. |

=== 6 May ===
List of shipwrecks: 6 May 1800
| Ship | State | Description |
|---|---|---|
| Charming Molly | Great Britain | The sloop was run down by another vessel in the English Channel off Poole, Dorset. |

=== 7 May ===
List of shipwrecks: 7 May 1800
| Ship | State | Description |
|---|---|---|
| HMS America | Great Britain | The Intrepid-class ship of the line ran aground on the Kent Sand, off Sheerness, Kent. She was on a voyage from Sheerness to The Downs. |

=== 8 May ===
List of shipwrecks: 8 May 1800
| Ship | State | Description |
|---|---|---|
| Alliance | Great Britain | The ship foundered in the Atlantic Ocean while on a voyage from London to New York, United States. Her crew were rescued by Beaver (Great Britain). |

=== 15 May ===
List of shipwrecks: 15 May 1800
| Ship | State | Description |
|---|---|---|
| HMS Cormorant | (Kingdom of Great Britain) Royal Navy | The ship ran aground off Damietta, Egypt, and was wrecked. |

=== 17 May ===
List of shipwrecks: 17 May 1800
| Ship | State | Description |
|---|---|---|
| Juliana Prospera | Stettin | The brigantine was driven ashore and wrecked at the Crowlink Gap, near Beachy Head, Sussex, Great Britain. Her crew were rescued. She was on a voyage from Bordeaux, Gironde, France to Stettin. |

=== 20 May ===
List of shipwrecks: 20 May 1800
| Ship | State | Description |
|---|---|---|
| Lord Donoughmore | Great Britain | The ship was wrecked on the Goodwin Sands, Kent while on a voyage from Cardiff, Glamorgan to London. Her crew were rescued. |

=== 27 May ===
List of shipwrecks: 27 May 1800
| Ship | State | Description |
|---|---|---|
| Industry | Great Britain | The ship foundered while on a voyage from Boston, Lincolnshire to the West Indies. |
| Labourer | Great Britain | The ship foundered in the Atlantic Ocean. She was on a voyage from Newfoundland, British North America to Lisbon, Portugal. |

=== Unknown date ===
List of shipwrecks: Unknown date in May 1800
| Ship | State | Description |
|---|---|---|
| Adventure | Great Britain | War of the Second Coalition: The ship was captured and burnt by the French. She was on a voyage from Liverpool, Lancashire to Madeira and Berbice. |
| Catharine | Great Britain | The ship was driven ashore and wrecked on the coast of Sweden while on a voyage from London to Saint Petersburg, Russia. |
| Catherina Magdalena | Rostock | The ship was wrecked on the Hoyle Bank, in Liverpool Bay, while on a voyage from Rostock to Liverpool. Her entire crew were lost. |
| Constantina Christina | Duchy of Holstein | The ship was wrecked on the Dutch coast while on a voyage from Husum to London, Great Britain. |
| Endeavour | Great Britain | The ship was wrecked at Portland, Dorset. Her crew were rescued. She was on a voyage from Neath, Glamorgan to Portsmouth, Hampshire. |
| Enterprize | Great Britain | The brig was wrecked near Kingsbridge, Devon. She was on a voyage from Bristol, Gloucestershire to Newfoundland, British North America. |
| Fortuna | Hamburg | The ship was driven ashore and wrecked west of Boulogne, Pas-de-Calais, France. She was on a voyage from Lisbon, Portugal to Altona, Hamburg. |
| Happy Return | Great Britain | The ship was driven ashore at Whitby, Yorkshire. Her crew were rescued. |
| Margaretta | Hamburg | War of the Second Coalition: The ship was captured by the Spanish and was subsequently lost. She was on a voyage from Alicante, Spain to Hamburg. |
| Mercury | Great Britain | The ship was abandoned by her crew. She was on a voyage from London to Newfoundland. She was subsequently taken in to the Isles of Scilly. |
| Molly | Great Britain | The ship foundered in Dublin Bay while on a voyage from Liverpool to Dublin, Ireland. |
| Nautilus | Bremen | The ship was wrecked at Blackwall, Middlesex, Great Britain. She was on a voyage from London to Bremen. |
| Persis | Great Britain | The ship was driven ashore on the coast of Lincolnshire. |
| Portland | United States | The ship was driven ashore and wrecked west of Boulogne. She was on a voyage from New York to Amsterdam, North Holland, Batavian Republic. |
| Sommer | Great Britain | The ship was driven ashore and wrecked in the Bristol Channel. She was on a voyage from Guernsey, Channel Islands to Bristol, Gloucestershire. |
| Thomas | Great Britain | The ship was destroyed by fire at Plymouth, Devon. Seven of her crew were rescued. |
| Union | Great Britain | The ship was lost on the Isle of Lewis, Outer Hebrides. She was on a voyage from Greenock, Renfrewshire to a Baltic port. |
| Venus | Great Britain | The ship was driven ashore at Whitby. Her crew were rescued. |

== June ==
=== 2 June ===
List of shipwrecks: 2 June 1800
| Ship | State | Description |
|---|---|---|
| Tuley | United States | The ship departed from Virginia for Saint Barthélemy. No furthert trace, presumed foundered with the loss of all hands. |

=== 19 June ===
List of shipwrecks: 19 June 1800
| Ship | State | Description |
|---|---|---|
| Gibraltar | (Kingdom of Great Britain) Gibraltar | The ship sprang a leak in the Atlantic Ocean off Cape St. Vincent, Spain and was abandoned by her crew. She was on a voyage from Gibraltar to Lisbon, Portugal. |

=== 20 June ===
List of shipwrecks: 20 June 1800
| Ship | State | Description |
|---|---|---|
| Anne | Great Britain | The sloop was wrecked in the Solway Firth of Ruthwell, Dumfreisshire. |

=== 27 June ===
List of shipwrecks: 27 June 1800
| Ship | State | Description |
|---|---|---|
| Fanny | Great Britain | The ship foundered at St. Kitts while on a voyage from Saint Vincent to London. Her crew were rescued. |

=== Unknown date ===
List of shipwrecks: Unknown date in June 1800
| Ship | State | Description |
|---|---|---|
| Ann | Great Britain | The ship foundered while on a voyage from "Saloe" to Guernsey, Channel Islands. |
| Catherina Margaretta | Hamburg | The ship was lost whilst on a voyage from Liverpool, Lancashire, Great Britain to Hamburg. |
| Cynthia | Great Britain | The ship was driven ashore at Elsinore, Denmark. She was on a voyage from Danzig to London. |
| Neptune | Great Britain | The ship was driven aground on The Nore and was wrecked while on a voyage from New York, United States to London. |
| St. John the Evangelist | Grand Duchy of Tuscany | The ship departed from Livorno. No further trace, presumed foundered with the loss of all hands. |
| Streatherly | Great Britain | The ship was wrecked on the Domesness Reef while on a voyage from Dysart, Fife to a Baltic port. |
| Two Brothers | Hamburg | The ship was wrecked on the Dutch coast while on a voyage from Hull, Yorkshire, Great Britain to Hamburg. |

== July ==
=== 6 July ===
List of shipwrecks: 6 July 1800
| Ship | State | Description |
|---|---|---|
| Hesperus | Danzig | The ship was wrecked on the Anholt Reef. She was on a voyage from Danzig to Liverpool, Lancashire, Great Britain. |

=== 9 July ===
List of shipwrecks: 9 July 1800
| Ship | State | Description |
|---|---|---|
| Queen | British East India Company | A fire destroyed this ship at Salvador, Bahia, Brazil, with the loss of 100 or so lives. |

=== 13 July ===
List of shipwrecks: 13 July 1800
| Ship | State | Description |
|---|---|---|
| Captain Zimmerman | Danzig | The ship ran aground on the Anholt Reef. She was on a voyage from Danzig to Liverpool, Lancashire, Great Britain. |

=== 17 July ===
List of shipwrecks: 17 July 1800
| Ship | State | Description |
|---|---|---|
| Unnamed | United States | The schooner parted her hawser and went aground in the roads of Cape Francois. Apparently pulled off by USS Constitution (United States Navy). |

=== 19 July ===
List of shipwrecks: 19 July 1800
| Ship | State | Description |
|---|---|---|
| Gibraltar | Great Britain | The ship sprang a leak in the Atlantic Ocean off Cape St. Vincent, Spain and was abandoned by her crew. |

=== 27 July ===
List of shipwrecks: 27 July 1800
| Ship | State | Description |
|---|---|---|
| La Fortune | France | Quasi War: The privateer schooner went aground off Mantanzes while being pursued by USS Ganges (United States Navy). She was abandoned by her crew, captured, pulled off by Ganges. |

=== Unknown date ===
List of shipwrecks: Unknown date in July 1800
| Ship | State | Description |
|---|---|---|
| Chance | Great Britain | The ship was abandoned in the Atlantic Ocean off the coast of Spain. Her crew survived. She was on a voyage from South Shields, County Durham to Grenada. |
| Enterprize | Great Britain | The ship sprang a leak and was beached on the Isle of Lewis. She was on a voyage from Liverpool, Lancashire to Danzig. |
| Glücklieche Weider Kunst | Prussia | The ship foundered while on a voyage from Rye, Sussex, Great Britain to Memel. Her crew were rescued. |
| Hevelius | Hamburg | The ship was driven ashore and severely damaged near Liverpool. She was on a voyage from Liverpool to Hamburg. |
| Isabella | Great Britain | The ship was lost in the White Sea. She was on a voyage from South Shields to Arkhangelsk, Russia. |
| Isabella | Great Britain | The ship was driven ashore at Dragør, Denmark. She was refloated. |
| King George | Great Britain | During a voyage from Jamaica to London, the ship ran aground on the coast of Jamaica at Pedro Point. When she fired her guns as a distress signal, the guns started a fire which spread to her magazine, causing an explosion that destroyed her and killed most of her crew and passengers. |
| Mississippi | United States | The ship was driven ashore and wrecked near Liverpool, Lancashire, Great Britain. She was on a voyage from Philadelphia, Pennsylvania, to Liverpool. |
| Telamon | Great Britain | The ship was driven ashore near Liverpool. She was on a voyage from Jamaica to Liverpool. |
| Thomas & Mary | Great Britain | The ship was driven ashore at Great Yarmouth, Norfolk. |

== August ==
=== 8 August ===
List of shipwrecks: 8 August 1800
| Ship | State | Description |
|---|---|---|
| USS Insurgent | United States Navy | The Sémillante-class frigate departed Norfolk, Virginia, bound for the West Indies and was never heard from again. |

=== 10 August ===
List of shipwrecks: 10 August 1800
| Ship | State | Description |
|---|---|---|
| HMS Dromedary | (Kingdom of Great Britain) Royal Navy | The Roebuck-class ship, a fifth rate frigate, was wrecked on Parasol Rocks, Trinidad. All on board survived. |

=== 14 August ===
List of shipwrecks: 14 August 1800
| Ship | State | Description |
|---|---|---|
| Sally | United States | The ship was wrecked at Currituck, North Carolina whilst bound for Málaga, Spain. |

=== 20 August ===
List of shipwrecks: 20 August 1800
| Ship | State | Description |
|---|---|---|
| USS Pickering | United States Navy | The topsail schooner departed Newscastle, Delaware, bound for Guadeloupe and was never heard from again. |

=== 22 August ===
List of shipwrecks: 22 August 1800
| Ship | State | Description |
|---|---|---|
| Mentor | Great Britain | The ship foundered while on a voyage from Jamaica to Liverpool, Lancashire. Her crew were rescued by Hope (Great Britain). |
| Speedwell | Great Britain | The sloop was wrecked at Montrose, Forfarshire while on a voyage from Leith, Lothian to Aberdeen with the loss of three of her five crew. |

=== 24 August ===
List of shipwrecks: 24 August 1800
| Ship | State | Description |
|---|---|---|
| Die Vorsigt | Duchy of Holstein | The koff was run down and sunk in the North Sea by the brig Henry (Great Britain). Her crew were rescued. She was on a voyage from London, Great Britain to Tönning. |

=== 26 August ===
List of shipwrecks: 26 August 1800
| Ship | State | Description |
|---|---|---|
| Equity | Great Britain | The ship was driven ashore and wrecked on Gotland, Sweden. |
| Venus | Great Britain | The ship was driven ashore and wrecked on Gotland. |

=== Unknown date ===
List of shipwrecks: Unknown date in August 1800
| Ship | State | Description |
|---|---|---|
| Constance | Hamburg | The ship was wrecked at Heligoland while on a voyage from Hamburg to Texel, North Holland, Batavian Republic. |
| Flying Fish | Great Britain | The cutter was wrecked at Margate, Kent. Her 24 crew were rescued. |
| Frederica | Danzig | The hoy was wrecked on the Haisborough Sands, in the North Sea off the coast of Norfolk, Great Britain. A crew member was lost. She was on a voyage from Danzig to Porto, Portugal. |
| Galgo | Great Britain | The ship was driven ashore. She was on a voyage from Sheerness, Kent to Saint Petersburg, Russia. She was refloated and taken in to Bornholm, Denmark. |
| Martha | (Kingdom of Great Britain) New South Wales | The schooner was wrecked at Little Manly Cove. |
| Martin | Danzig | The ship foundered in the Baltic Sea off Elsinore, Denmark. Her crew were rescued. She was on a voyage from Danzig to a French port. |
| Morning Star | Great Britain | The ship was driven ashore and wrecked at Poole, Dorset. She was on a voyage from London to Poole. |
| Orion | Great Britain | The ship was driven ashore on the coast of Suffolk. She was on a voyage from Memel, Prussia to London. She was refloated and taken in to Harwich, Essex in a waterlogged condition. |
| Peter | Ireland | The ship was lost at Viana do Castelo, Portugal. She was on a voyage from Belfast, County Antrim to Porto. |
| Resolution | Ireland | The ship was wrecked at Memel. She was on a voyage from Dublin to Memel. |
| Sylvan | Great Britain | The ship foundered. Her crew were rescued. She was on a voyage from London to Riga, Russia. |
| Thomas and Sally | Great Britain | The ship ran aground on the Middle Sand, in the North Sea off the coast of Essex and was severely damaged. She was on a voyage from London to Exeter, Devon. She was refloated and taken in to Sheerness. |

== September ==
=== 2 September ===
List of shipwrecks: 2 September 1800
| Ship | State | Description |
|---|---|---|
| Eliza | Great Britain | The schooner capsized in the Atlantic Ocean (22°00′N 57°30′W) while on a voyage from Halifax, British North America to Barbados. She righted herself but was waterlogged and one of her crew was lost. The survivors were rescued on 17 September by Retrieve (Great Britain). |
| William | Great Britain | The ship foundered while on a voyage from Jamaica to Newbery Port, Massachusetts, United States. Her crew were rescued. |

=== 6 September ===
List of shipwrecks: 6 September 1800
| Ship | State | Description |
|---|---|---|
| HMS Stag | Royal Navy | The fifth rate was driven ashore in Vigo Bay. Her crew survived. She was set afire and burnt the next day. |
| Unnamed | (Kingdom of Great Britain) Guernsey | The cutter was driven ashore in Vigo Bay. Her crew were rescued. |

=== 7 September ===
List of shipwrecks: 7 September 1800
| Ship | State | Description |
|---|---|---|
| Hope | United States | The ship was wrecked at sea in a hurricane whilst on a voyage from Wilmington, North Carolina to Jamaica. Her crew were rescued on 17 September by Mercury (United States). Hope sank that day. |
| Hope | Great Britain | The ship ran aground on the Lapsand, in the Baltic Sea. She was refloated and put back to Helsingør, Denmark. |
| Pacific | United States | Quasi War: The commissioned private armed ship was captured and burned by Franchise (French Navy) in the Atlantic Ocean (37°06′N 43°06′W). |

=== 20 September ===
List of shipwrecks: 20 September 1800
| Ship | State | Description |
|---|---|---|
| Dorchester | Great Britain | The ship was abandoned at sea. She was discovered by the lugger Nile (Great Britain) and taken in to The Downs. |

=== 22 September ===
List of shipwrecks: 22 September 1800
| Ship | State | Description |
|---|---|---|
| Mentor | Great Britain | The ship foundered in the Atlantic Ocean. Her crew were rescued by Hope (Great Britain). Mentor was on a voyage from Jamaica to Liverpool, Lancashire. |

=== 26 September ===
List of shipwrecks: 26 September 1800
| Ship | State | Description |
|---|---|---|
| HMS Hound | (Kingdom of Great Britain) Royal Navy | The Diligence-class brig-sloop foundered off the Shetland Islands with the loss of all hands. |
| Tsvey Bruder No. 2 (Цвей брудер, 'Zwei Brüder') | Imperial Russian Navy | The transport ship sprang a leak and during a beaching attempt ran aground near fi:Orrengrund Lighthouse. Her crew were rescued. She was on a voyage from Reval to Kronstadt. |

=== 28 September ===
List of shipwrecks: 28 September 1800
| Ship | State | Description |
|---|---|---|
| Liverpool | Great Britain | The ship foundered in the North Sea while on a voyage from Liverpool, Lancashire to Riga, Russia. |

=== 30 September ===
List of shipwrecks: 30 September 1800
| Ship | State | Description |
|---|---|---|
| Nelly | Great Britain | The transport ship was in collision with Walter Boyd (Great Britain) in Cadiz Bay and sank. |

=== Unknown date ===
List of shipwrecks: Unknown date in September 1800
| Ship | State | Description |
|---|---|---|
| Ceres | Great Britain | The ship was driven ashore and wrecked between Calais, Pas-de-Calais and Gravelines, Pas-de-Calais, France while on a voyage from London to Calais. All on board were rescued. |
| Commerce | United States | The ship was wrecked at Liverpool, Lancashire, Great Britain. She was on a voyage from Virginia, United States to Liverpool. |
| De Jung Jacob | Flag unknown | The ship was driven ashore near Cardigan, Great Britain. She was on a voyage from Dublin, Ireland to Málaga, Spain. |
| Equity | Great Britain | The ship was driven ashore and wrecked on Gotland, Sweden. |
| Flying Fish | Great Britain | The cutter was wrecked in Lemon's Bay, Margate, Kent. All 34 crew were rescued. |
| Hope | Great Britain | The ship was lost near Padstow, Cornwall. She was on a voyage from Dublin to Plymouth, Devon. |
| Industry | Ireland | The ship was driven ashore in Dublin Bay. She was on a voyage from Lisbon, Portugal to Dublin. |
| Jersey | Great Britain | The ship was wrecked on Öland, Sweden. |
| Lucy | Ireland | The ship was driven ashore and wrecked at Cork. She was on a voyage from Charleston, South Carolina, United States to Cork. |
| Lucy | United States | The ship capsized in the Atlantic Ocean. Ten survivors were rescued on 21 September by Resolution (Great Britain). |
| Pitt | Great Britain | The ship was driven ashore and wrecked at Sheerness, Kent. |
| St Johannes | Great Britain | The ship was lost near Cardigan. She was on a voyage from Liverpool to Falmouth, Cornwall. |
| Union | Great Britain | The ship was destroyed by fire at Falmouth. She was on a voyage from Bristol, Gloucestershire to Lisbon, Portugal. |
| Venus | Great Britain | The ship was driven ashore and wrecked on Gotland. |
| Withywood | Great Britain | The ship was driven ashore on Saltholm, Denmark. She was on a voyage from London to Riga, Russia. |

== October ==
=== 3 October ===
List of shipwrecks: 3 October 1800
| Ship | State | Description |
|---|---|---|
| Kichkasy (Кичкасы) | Imperial Russian Navy | The gabarre was driven ashore on the coast of Rumelia, Ottoman Empire, 20 versts (12 nautical miles (21 km)) from the entrance to the Bosphorus with the loss of twelve of her crew. She was on a voyage from Nikolayev to Constantinople, Ottoman Empire. |

=== 4 October ===
List of shipwrecks: 4 October 1800
| Ship | State | Description |
|---|---|---|
| Neptunus | Danzig | The ship was sighted in the Øresund on this date while on a voyage from Danzig to London, Great Britain. No further trace, presumed foundered with the loss of all hands. |

=== 8 October ===
List of shipwrecks: 8 October 1800
| Ship | State | Description |
|---|---|---|
| HMS Diligence | (Kingdom of Great Britain) Royal Navy | Diligence-class brig-sloop struck a reef in the Gulf of Mexico 5 nautical miles (9.3 km; 5.8 mi) off the coast of Cuba. She was abandoned and set afire. Her crew were rescued by ship of the line HMS Thunderer ( (Kingdom of Great Britain) Royal Navy). |
| Unnamed | Great Britain | The West Indiaman was wrecked off Dunkerque, Nord, France with the loss of both crew. Sixteen crew had previously been taken off after she drove out to sea from Margate, Ketn. |

=== 9 October ===
List of shipwrecks: 9 October 1800
| Ship | State | Description |
|---|---|---|
| HMS Galgo | (Kingdom of Great Britain) Royal Navy | The frigate capsized and sank in the Atlantic Ocean off the coast of Virginia, United States with the loss of 96 of her 121 crew. Survivors were rescued by Hunter (United States). |
| Makary (Макарий, 'Macarius') | Imperial Russian Navy | The xebec was driven ashore and wrecked near Çilingoz, Ottoman Empire, 80 versts (46 nautical miles (85 km)) from the entrance to the Bosphorus. Her crew survived. |
| Pospeshny (Поспешный, 'Hasty') | Imperial Russian Navy | The frigate was driven ashore and wrecked on the coast of Rumelia, Ottoman Empire, near Constantinople, with the loss of thirteen of her crew. |

=== 10 October ===
List of shipwrecks: 10 October 1800
| Ship | State | Description |
|---|---|---|
| Margaret | Great Britain | The ship was wrecked at Castletown, County Wexford, Ireland with the loss of a crew member. She was on a voyage from the Clyde to a port in Virginia, United States. |
| Smyrna | Great Britain | The snow was driven ashore and wrecked at Dounreay, Caithness with the loss of six of her nine crew. She was on a voyage from Arkhangelsk, Russia to London. |

=== 15 October ===
List of shipwrecks: 15 October 1800
| Ship | State | Description |
|---|---|---|
| Favourite | Great Britain | The ship was driven ashore at Falsterbo, Sweden while on a voyage from London to Memel, Prussia. |

=== 16 October ===
List of shipwrecks: 16 October 1800
| Ship | State | Description |
|---|---|---|
| HMS Urchin | (Kingdom of Great Britain) Royal Navy | The gunboat foundered at Gibraltar with the loss of five of her crew. |

=== 17 October ===
List of shipwrecks: 17 October 1800
| Ship | State | Description |
|---|---|---|
| Mount Vernon | United States | The 355 ton 20 gun commissioned private armed ship was wrecked on a reef off Little Davis Island 30 Leagues north west of La Guaira. |

=== 19 October ===
List of shipwrecks: 19 October 1800
| Ship | State | Description |
|---|---|---|
| Charles | United States | The ship was driven ashore and wrecked on Smith's Island, North Carolina. She was on a voyage from Bombay, India to Boston, Massachusetts. |

=== 20 October ===
List of shipwrecks: 20 October 1800
| Ship | State | Description |
|---|---|---|
| Portland | Great Britain | The ship departed from Lisbon, Portugal for Bilbao, Spain on this date. She was subsequently driven ashore and wrecked at Bayonne, Basses-Pyrénées, France. |

=== 21 October ===
List of shipwrecks: 22 October 1800
| Ship | State | Description |
|---|---|---|
| Three unnamed vessels | Great Britain | Two ships were driven ashore and one capsized at Sunderland, County Durham. |

=== 22 October ===
List of shipwrecks: 22 October 1800
| Ship | State | Description |
|---|---|---|
| Dorothea Louisa | Stettin | The ship foundered off the Norwegian coast while on a voyage from Stettin to London, Great Britain. Her crew were rescued. |
| Earl Talbot | British East India Company | The ship, which had departed from Bombay, India for Canton, China on 16 August. was presumed to have foundered with the loss of all hands c. 22 October. |

=== 23 October ===
List of shipwrecks: 23 October 1800
| Ship | State | Description |
|---|---|---|
| 16 unnamed vessels | (Kingdom of Great Britain) Isle of Man | The fishing vessels were driven ashore and wrecked at Peeltown. |

=== 24 October ===
List of shipwrecks: 24 October 1800
| Ship | State | Description |
|---|---|---|
| Charles Baring | Great Britain | The West Indiaman foundered in the Atlantic Ocean with the loss of 27 lives. Twenty-nine survivors were rescued two days later by Harriot (United States). |
| Little John | Great Britain | The schooner ran aground on the Goodwin Sands, Kent and was abandoned by her crew. She was on a voyage from London to Bilbao, Spain. Little John was later refloated and taken in to Ramsgate, Kent. |

=== 26 October ===
List of shipwrecks: 26 October 1800
| Ship | State | Description |
|---|---|---|
| George | Great Britain | The snow sank at Philadelphia, Pennsylvania, United States. She was on a voyage from Philadelphia to Hull, Yorkshire. |

=== 29 October ===
List of shipwrecks: 29 October 1800
| Ship | State | Description |
|---|---|---|
| John and Edward | Great Britain | The sloop foundered off the Isle of Wight. Her crew survived. She was on a voyage from Southampton, Hampshire to Poole, Dorset. |
| Triumph | Great Britain | The ship departed from Cuxhaven for Livorno, Grand Duchy of Tuscany. No further trace, presumed foundered with the loss of all hands. |

=== Unknown date ===
List of shipwrecks: Unknown date in October 1800
| Ship | State | Description |
|---|---|---|
| Brothers | Great Britain | The ship departed from Mahón, Spain for Gibraltar. No further trace, presumed foundered in the Mediterranean Sea with the loss of all hands. |
| Ceres | Great Britain | The ship was driven ashore near Gravelines, Nord, France. She was on a voyage from London to Calais, France. |
| Earl Talbot | British East India Company | The East Indiaman was wrecked on the Pratas Shoal, off the coast of China. |
| Frederick | Great Britain | The ship ran aground at Carmarthen. She was on a voyage from Saint Petersburg, Russia to Chepstow, Monmouthshire. |
| India Packet | Great Britain | War of the Second Coalition: The ship was burnt off Gibraltar after an engagement with some privateers. She was on a voyage from the West Indies to Gibraltar. |
| Industry | Great Britain | The ship was driven ashore at Portsmouth, Hampshire. She was on a voyage from Poole, Dorset to Newfoundland, British North America. She was later refloated . |
| Industry | Great Britain | The ship was wrecked on Bornholm, Denmark. |
| Jane | Great Britain | The ship capsized at Liverpool, Lancashire. |
| Juliana Prosperas | Batavian Republic | The ship was wrecked at Calais, France. |
| London | Great Britain | The ship was wrecked on the Swin Sands, in the North Sea off the coast of Essex, while on a voyage from Liverpool, Lancashire to a Baltic port. |
| Lord Castlereagh | Ireland | The ship was driven ashore in Belfast Lough. She was on a voyage from Dronton to Newry, County Armagh. |
| Margaret | Great Britain | The ship was wrecked in Sligo Bay while of a voyage from Liverpool to Virginia, United States. |
| HMS Martin | (Kingdom of Great Britain) Royal Navy | Hound-class sloop-of-war disappeared in the North Sea with the loss of all hands. |
| Merry Andrew | Great Britain | The ship was driven ashore and wrecked at Portishead, Somerset. She was on a voyage from Bristol, Gloucestershire to Lisbon, Portugal. |
| New Active | Great Britain | The ship was driven ashore at Rock Ferry, Cheshire. She was on a voyage from Liverpool to Dundalk, County Louth, Ireland. |
| Pitt | Great Britain | The ship was driven ashore near Sheerness, Kent. She was on a voyage from Jamaica to London. |
| Rebecca & Mary | Great Britain | The ship was wrecked on Anglesey. She was on a voyage from Dartmouth, Devon to Liverpool. |
| Robert | Ireland | The ship was wrecked in Broadhaven Bay while on a voyage from Londonderry to Charleston, South Carolina, United States. |
| Sally | Ireland | The ship sank at Dublin. She was on a voyage from Danzig to Dublin. |
| Speculation | Great Britain | The ship was driven ashore at Arklow, County Wicklow, Ireland. She was on a voyage from Dublin to London. |
| Scipio | Great Britain | The ship foundered off Ballyraine, county Donegal, Ireland. Her crew were rescued. She was on a voyage from Lancaster, Lancashire to Hamburg. |
| True Briton | Great Britain | The ship was wrecked at Hoylake, Cheshire while on a voyage from Liverpool to Strangford, County Down, Ireland. |
| William | United States | The ship was wrecked on the Pluckington Bank, in Liverpool Bay while on a voyage from Virginia to Liverpool. |
| Unnamed | Portugal | War of the Second Coalition: The brig was attacked by a French privateer in the Strait of Gibraltar. She caught fire due to the bursting of a gun. Her crew survived. |

== November ==
=== 2 November ===
List of shipwrecks: 2 November 1800
| Ship | State | Description |
|---|---|---|
| Vrouw Alida | Batavian Republic | The ship departed Dordrecht. South Holland for London, Great Britain. No further trace, presumed foundered with the loss of all hands. |

=== 3 November ===
List of shipwrecks: 3 November 1800
| Ship | State | Description |
|---|---|---|
| HMS Marlborough | (Kingdom of Great Britain) Royal Navy | The third rate ship of the line was wrecked off Belle Île, Finistère, France. Her crew were rescued by Amity (Spain) and HMS Captain ( (Kingdom of Great Britain) Royal Navy). |

=== 4 November ===
List of shipwrecks: 4 November 1800
| Ship | State | Description |
|---|---|---|
| Orestes | British East India Company | The East Indiaman was last sighted on this date whilst on a voyage from Bombay, India to the Persian Gulf. She was presumed to have foundered in a cyclone which started the next day. All hands lost. |

=== 8 November ===
List of shipwrecks: 8 November 1800
| Ship | State | Description |
|---|---|---|
| Nancy | Great Britain | War of the Second Coalition: The ship was captured by the privateer La Gironde (France) and was burnt. She was on a voyage from the Clyde to Charleston, South Carolina, United States. |

=== 9 November ===
List of shipwrecks: 9 November 1800
| Ship | State | Description |
|---|---|---|
| Bridget | Great Britain | The brig was driven ashore and wrecked at Waxham, Norfolk with the loss of four of her crew. |
| Falconer | Great Britain | The ship was driven ashore and wrecked at Waxham. |
| Flora | Great Britain | The ship was driven ashore at Portsmouth, Hampshire. She was later refloated and taken in to Portsmouth. |
| Friends | Great Britain | The ship was driven ashore at Portsmouth. She was on a voyage from London to Gibraltar. |
| HMS Havick | (Kingdom of Great Britain) Royal Navy | The ship sloop was wrecked in St Aubin's Bay, Jersey, Channel Islands. |
| Hope | Great Britain | The ship was wrecked on the Woolsener Sand in the English Channel. Her crew were rescued. She was on a voyage from Portsmouth to Gibraltar. |
| Hunter | Great Britain | The ship was driven ashore at Portsmouth. She was on a voyage from Glasgow, Renfrewshire to New Providence, New Jersey, United States and the West Indies. She was later refloated and taken in to Portsmouth. |
| HMS Hussar | Royal Navy | The Amazon-class frigate was driven ashore at Portsmouth. She was refloated. |
| Incredible | Great Britain | The transport ship was wrecked on the Horse Sand in the English Channel. Her crew were rescued. |
| John | Great Britain | The cutter was driven ashore and wrecked at Plymouth, Devon. |
| Hired armed cutter Lion | (Kingdom of Great Britain) Royal Navy | The 14-gun hired armed cutter was driven ashore in St. Aubin's Bay but was later refloated. |
| HMS Pelican | (Kingdom of Great Britain) Royal Navy | The Sloop-of-War was driven ashore and wrecked in St. Aubin's Bay but was later refloated. Neither Pelican nor Havick suffered any casualties, though crews were subject to waves breaking over them for six hours until the tide, which had risen 32 feet (perpendicular), providentially receded. |
| Pluto | Batavian Navy | The third rate ship of the line was driven ashore at Vlissingen, Zeeland. She was later refloated and returned to service. |
| Swan | Great Britain | The ship was driven ashore and wrecked at Waxham. |
| Thetis | Great Britain | The ship was driven ashore at Portsmouth. |
| Unnamed | (Kingdom of Great Britain) Guernsey | The privateer was driven ashore and wrecked in St. Aubin's Bay. |
| Unnamed | Great Britain | The collier was driven ashore and wrecked at Sea Palling, Norfolk with the loss of four of her crew. |

=== 11 November ===
List of shipwrecks: 11 November 1800
| Ship | State | Description |
|---|---|---|
| American Hero | United States | The ship was wrecked on the Goodwin Sands, Kent, Great Britain. She was on a voyage from Virginia to Amsterdam, North Holland, Batavian Republic. |

=== 12 November ===
List of shipwrecks: 12 November 1800
| Ship | State | Description |
|---|---|---|
| Commerce | Great Britain | The ship was wrecked on the Kole while on a voyage from Danzig to London. |
| Edward | Great Britain | War of the Second Coalition: The ship was captured in the North Sea by the privateer Le Marengo (France) and was sunk by her. She was on a voyage from Aberdeen to London. |
| Ellison | Great Britain | War of the Second Coalition: The ship was captured in the North Sea by the privateer Le Marengo (France) and was sunk by her. She was on a voyage from Aberdeen to Newcastle-upon-Tyne, Northumberland. |

=== 15 November ===
List of shipwrecks: 15 November 1800
| Ship | State | Description |
|---|---|---|
| John | United States | The ship was wrecked off Deadman Point, Devon, Great Britain. She was refloated and taken in to Sutton Pool. |
| Unnamed | Flag unknown | The lugger foundered off Rame Head, Cornwall, Great Britain with the loss of all hands. |

=== 16 November ===
List of shipwrecks: 16 November 1800
| Ship | State | Description |
|---|---|---|
| Leocadia | Spain | The ship was wrecked off Punta de Santa Elena, Gran Colombia with the loss of over 140 lives. She was on a voyage from Paita to Panama City, Gran Colombia. |
| Unnamed | Great Britain | The ship foundered with the loss of more than 40 lives. She was on a voyage from Torbay to Portsmouth, Hampshire. |

=== 18 November ===
List of shipwrecks: 18 November 1800
| Ship | State | Description |
|---|---|---|
| Peterhead and Banff Packet | Great Britain | The ship foundered in the North Sea off the Bell Rock, Fife with the loss of five of her crew. She was on a voyage from Peterhead, Aberdeenshire to London. |

=== 20 November ===
List of shipwrecks: 20 November 1800
| Ship | State | Description |
|---|---|---|
| HM hired brig Flora | (Kingdom of Great Britain) Royal Navy | The brig was driven ashore and capsized in the Hamoaze near Plymouth, Devon. |

=== 24 November ===
List of shipwrecks: 24 November 1800
| Ship | State | Description |
|---|---|---|
| Brothers | Great Britain | The ship was wrecked at Madeira, Portugal. |
| Herkener | United States | The schooner was wrecked at Madeira. |
| Jupiter | Great Britain | The brig was destroyed by fire at Portsmouth, Hampshire with the loss of a crew member. She was on a voyage from Gibraltar to Guernsey, Channel Islands. |

=== 25 November ===
List of shipwrecks: 25 November 1800
| Ship | State | Description |
|---|---|---|
| Olive Branch | Great Britain | The ship foundered off Karlskrona, Sweden. Her crew were rescued. |
| Sussex | Great Britain | The sloop sprang a leak and foundered in the English Channel off Dungeness, Kent. Her crew survived. |

=== 27 November ===
List of shipwrecks: 27 November 1800
| Ship | State | Description |
|---|---|---|
| Eagle | Great Britain | The ship was wrecked on the Cockle Sand, in the North Sea off the coast of Norfolk. Her crew were rescued. |

=== Unknown date ===
List of shipwrecks: Unknown date in November 1800
| Ship | State | Description |
|---|---|---|
| Adventure | Great Britain | War of the Second Coalition: The ship exploded and sank during a battle with a privateer. She was on a voyage from Gibraltar to Trinidada, Brazil. |
| Alice | Great Britain | The ship was driven ashore and wrecked at Memel, Prussia while on a voyage from Liverpool, Lancashire to Memel. Her crew were rescued. |
| Alina | Great Britain | The ship was driven ashore on Walcheren, Zeeland, Batavian Republic while bound for Antwerp, France. |
| Ann | Great Britain | The ship was wrecked on Dursey Island, County Cork, Ireland while on a voyage from Limerick, Ireland to London. Her crew were rescued. |
| Anna Maria | Great Britain | The ship was lost at Riga, Russia. |
| Britannia | Great Britain | The ship was driven ashore and wrecked at Falmouth, Cornwall while on a voyage from London to Bristol, Gloucestershire and Venice. |
| Britannia | Great Britain | The ship foundered in the Bristol Channel. She was on a voyage from London to Bristol. |
| Charlotte | United States | The ship was driven ashore at Dunkirk, Nord. France. |
| Dispatch | (Kingdom of Great Britain) Guernsey | The ship was driven ashore and wrecked at Weymouth, Dorset with the loss of two of her crew. |
| Elizabeth | Great Britain | The ship was wrecked on the Norwegian coast. She was on a voyage from Hull, Yorkshire to Riga. |
| Enterprize | Great Britain | The ship was wrecked on Anticosti Island while on a voyage from Martinique to London. |
| Experience | Great Britain | The ship was driven ashore whilst on a voyage from Málaga, Spain to Liverpool. |
| Euphemia | Great Britain | The ship was wrecked at Cape Wrath, Sutherland while on a voyage from Liverpool, Lancashire to Hamburg. Her crew were rescued. |
| HMS Flora | Royal Navy | The ship capsized in the Hamoaze near Plymouth, Devon. |
| Hope | Great Britain | The ship was wrecked on Bornholm, Denmark. Her crew were rescued. |
| Hunter | Great Britain | The ship was driven ashore near Liverpool. She was on a voyage from Rotterdam, South Holland, Batavian Republic to Liverpool. |
| Industry | Great Britain | The ship was wrecked at Skagen, Denmark. Her crew were rescued. She was on a voyage from Hull to a Baltic port. |
| Innocenza Protetta | Portugal | The ship was driven ashore and wrecked at Rye, Sussex, Great Britain while on a voyage from London to Lisbon. |
| Iris | Stettin | The ship was wrecked on the coast of Holland. She was on a voyage from Stettin to London. |
| Johanna | Bremen | The ship foundered off Land's End, Cornwall, Great Britain. She was on a voyage from Liverpool to Bremen. |
| John | Great Britain | The ship was driven ashore and wrecked on "Eartholms". Her crew were rescued. She was on a voyage from Danzig to Leith, Lothian. |
| Lyde | Great Britain | The ship was wrecked on the Doomsness Reef. |
| Mars | Prussia | The ship was wrecked while on a voyage from Swinemünde to London. |
| Nelly | Great Britain | The ship foundered in the Gulf of Finland. She was on a voyage from Saint Petersburg, Russia to London. |
| Olive Branch | Great Britain | The ship was driven ashore and wrecked in the Gulf of Finland while on a voyage from Leith to Saint Petersburg. |
| Ranger | Great Britain | The ship was wrecked off Kronstadt, Russia while on a voyage from London to Saint Petersburg. |
| Rebecca and Mary | Great Britain | The ship was driven ashore and wrecked on Anglesey while on a voyage from Dartmouth, Devon to Liverpool, Lancashire. |
| Summer | (Kingdom of Great Britain) Guernsey | The ship was lost at Guernsey. She was on a voyage from Guernsey to Belfast County Antrim, Ireland. |
| Swallow | Ireland | The ship departed Cork for Jamaica during November. No further trace, presumed foundered with the loss of all hands. |
| Swift | Great Britain | The ship was driven ashore and wrecked on the Isle of Portland, Dorset. She was on a voyage from Southampton, Hampshire to Plymouth, Devon. |
| Thomas and Alice | Great Britain | The ship was wrecked on Scroby Sands, Norfolk. She was on a voyage from Newcastle upon Tyne, Northumberland to London. |
| Triton | Great Britain | The ship was lost whilst on a voyage from Cardiff, Glamorgan to London. Her crew were rescued. |
| Two Friends | Great Britain | The ship was driven ashore at Portsmouth, Hampshire. |
| Unanimity | Great Britain | The ship foundered in the North Sea while on a voyage from King's Lynn, Norfolk to a Baltic port. |
| Vigilantia | Bremen | The ship was driven ashore near Brement. She was on a voyage from Bremen to Lisbon, Portugal. |
| Venus | Great Britain | The ship departed Liverpool for Gibraltar in early November. No further trace, presumed foundered with the loss of all hands. |
| Vorsighheten | Sweden | The ship was driven ashore near Kronstadt, Russia. |
| Vulcan | Great Britain | The ship was lost whilst on a voyage from Sunderland, County Durham to London. Her crew were rescued. |
| Ward | Great Britain | The ship was lost at Dagerort, Russia. Her crew were rescued. She was on a voyage from Hull to Saint Petersburg, Russia. |
| William and John | Great Britain | The ship sprang a leak in the North Sea while on a voyage from Ramsgate, Kent to St. Petersburg and was abandoned by her crew. |
| Two unnamed vessels | Batavian Navy | A ship of the line and a frigate were driven ashore and wrecked at Hellevoetsluis, Zeeland. |
| Unnamed | Great Britain | The ship foundered. She was on a voyage from Hamburg to Newcastle upon Tyne. |

== December ==
=== 1 December ===
List of shipwrecks: 1 December 1800
| Ship | State | Description |
|---|---|---|
| HMS Superb | Royal Navy | The Pompée-class ship of the line ran aground at Portsmouth, Hampshire. She was refloated. |

=== 4 December ===
List of shipwrecks: 4 December 1800
| Ship | State | Description |
|---|---|---|
| Britannia | Great Britain | The ship foundered while on a voyage from Surinam and Martinique to London. Her crew were rescued. |

=== 11 December ===
List of shipwrecks: 11 December 1800
| Ship | State | Description |
|---|---|---|
| Constance | Dutch East India Company | The East Indiaman was wrecked off Madagascar with the loss of 146 of the 150 people on board. |
| Nancy | Great Britain | The ship was wrecked on the coast of Delaware 70 nautical miles (130 km) south of Wilmington, Delaware, United States. She was on a voyage from Liverpool, Lancashire to Wilmington. |

=== 14 December ===
List of shipwrecks: 14 December 1800
| Ship | State | Description |
|---|---|---|
| William and Mary | Great Britain | The brig was wrecked on the Mewstone, in the English Channel. Her crew were rescued. |

=== 16 December ===
List of shipwrecks: 16 December 1800
| Ship | State | Description |
|---|---|---|
| Traveller | Great Britain | The ship foundered in the Atlantic Ocean (48°00′N 49°15′W). Her crew were rescued by HMS Hydra ( (Kingdom of Great Britain) Royal Navy). She was on a voyage from Martinique to London. |

=== 18 December ===
List of shipwrecks: 18 December 1800
| Ship | State | Description |
|---|---|---|
| Grantham Packet | Great Britain | The ship ran aground off Barbados as she was coming to Jamaica from Falmouth, and was wrecked. Her crew were rescued. The Post Office hired Caroline to carry Grantham Packet's passengers and mail to England, but Caroline was wrecked at Jamaica before she could leave for England. |
| Mary and Elizabeth | Great Britain | The ship was wrecked near the mouth of the River Yalm. |

=== 19 December ===
List of shipwrecks: 19 December 1800
| Ship | State | Description |
|---|---|---|
| Amphion | Sweden | The brig was wrecked on the Goodwin Sands, Kent, Great Britain. Her crew were rescued. She was on a voyage from Saint Petersburg, Russia to Naples, Kingdom of Sicily. |
| Niagara | Flag unknown | The ship was wrecked on the Goodwin Sands. |

=== 20 December ===
List of shipwrecks: 20 December 1800
| Ship | State | Description |
|---|---|---|
| Belmont Castle | Great Britain | The sloop was wrecked on Canna while on a voyage from Greenock, Renfrewshire to the Isle of Harris. |

=== 28 December ===
List of shipwrecks: 28 December 1800
| Ship | State | Description |
|---|---|---|
| Eliza | Great Britain | The ship departed from South Shields, County Durham. No further trace, presumed foundered in the North Sea with the loss of all hands. |

=== 31 December ===
List of shipwrecks: 31 December 1800
| Ship | State | Description |
|---|---|---|
| Aid | Great Britain | The brigantine carrying a cargo of coal, ran aground near the east pier of Newhaven Harbour and was wrecked. Her crew were rescued. |

=== Unknown date ===
List of shipwrecks: Unknown in December date 1800
| Ship | State | Description |
|---|---|---|
| Alcibiades | Stettin | The ship struck Scroby Sands, Norfolk, Great Britain. She was beached at Great Yarmouth, Norfolk. Alcibiades was on a voyage from Stettin to London, Great Britain. |
| Alfred | Great Britain | The ship was driven ashore and wrecked on Gotland, Sweden. |
| Aurora | Great Britain | The ship foundered off Campbeltown, Argyllshire while on a voyage from Londonderry, Ireland to Liverpool, Lancashire. |
| Betsey | Great Britain | The brig foundered in the English Channel off Dover, Kent. |
| Commercio | Portugal | The ship was lost near Porto with the loss of all hands. She was on a voyage from Pernambuco, Brazil to Porto. |
| Conceição | Portugal | The ship was lost on a voyage from Lisbon to São Miguel Island, Azores. |
| David | Great Britain | The ship was driven ashore and wrecked near Ystad, Sweden. |
| David | Great Britain | The ship was driven ashore and wrecked on Sandhammer while on a voyage from a Baltic port to the Firth of Forth. |
| Diligence | Great Britain | The brig was wrecked off Cuba. Her crew survived. |
| Eenigheten | (Denmark) Norway | The ship was wrecked on Öland, Sweden. |
| Elbing | Elbing | The barque was driven ashore and wrecked at Kinghorn, Fife, Great Britain whilst on a voyage from Leith, Lothian, Great Britain to Elbing. |
| Eenigheten | Sweden | The ship was driven ashore on Öland. She was on a voyage from Norrköping to London. |
| Epoca | Sweden | The ship was lost on the Lessoe Shoals. She was on a voyage from Norrköping to London. |
| Fortuna | Great Britain | The ship was driven ashore on Texel, North Holland, Batavian Republic and was wrecked while on a voyage from Amsterdam to Smyrna, Ottoman Empire. |
| Galbo | Great Britain | The brig was wrecked off Jamaica with the loss of 98 of the 123 people on board. |
| Gravalia | | The ship foundered in the Irish Sea off Kinsale, County Cork, Ireland while on a voyage from Spain to Hamburg. |
| Harmony | Great Britain | The ship was wrecked on Læsø, Denmark. Her crew were rescued. She was on a voyage from Danzig to London. |
| Hercules | Great Britain | The ship foundered in the Atlantic Ocean while on a voyage from Newfoundland, British North America to London. Her crew were rescued by Virginia (United States). |
| Highland Lass | Great Britain | The ship was driven ashore and wrecked near Deal, Kent while on a voyage from Demerara to London. Her crew were rescued. |
| Kran Prinzen | Sweden | The ship foundered off Texel. Her crew were rescued. She was on a voyage from Norrköping to Livorno, Grand Duchy of Tuscany. |
| Margaret | Great Britain | The ship was lost at Stromness, Orkney Islands. She was on a voyage from "Tanero" to Hull, Yorkshire. |
| Mary Ann | Great Britain | War of the Second Coalition: The ship was captured and recaptured. She was subsequently lost at Porto, Portugal. |
| Metta | Stettin | The ship foundered off Gothenburg, Sweden while on a voyage from Great Yarmouth to Stettin. |
| Minerva | Great Britain | The ship was driven ashore at Winterton-on-Sea, Norfolk. She was on a voyage from Saint Petersburg, Russia to Lisbon. |
| Navigator | United States | The ship foundered in the Indian Ocean (23°27′S 36°37′E). All 70 people on board survived. She was on a voyage from an American port to Bombay, India. |
| Patty | Great Britain | The ship sprang a leak and was abandoned in the Irish Sea while on a voyage from Liverpool to Plymouth, Devon. Her crew survived. She subsequently came ashore on the Irish coast and was wrecked. |
| Prince Edward | Great Britain | The ship foundered off Bergen, Norway with the loss of two of her crew. She was on a voyage from Arkhangelsk, Russia to London. |
| Resolution | Great Britain | The ship sank at Pillau, Prussia. |
| True Brothers | Great Britain | The ship was wrecked on the Cockle Sand, in the North Sea off the coast of Norfolk. |
| Waacksamkeit | Danzig | The ship was lost in the "Highlands of Scotland". She was on a voyage from Liverpool to Danzig. |
| Washington Packet | United States | The ship was driven ashore at Sandy Hook while of a voyage from Dublin, Ireland to Virginia. |
| William & Mary | Great Britain | War of the Second Coalition: The ship was captured off Land's End, Cornwall. She was recaptured by the lugger Plymouth (Great Britain). William & Mary was subsequently lost near Plymouth. Her crew were rescued. |
| Yarmouth | Great Britain | The brig foundered in the North Sea with the loss of a crew member. She was on a voyage from a Baltic port to Hull. |

== Unknown date ==
List of shipwrecks: Unknown date in 1800
| Ship | State | Description |
|---|---|---|
| Abercrombie | Great Britain | The ship was wrecked while on a voyage from Corringor to Calcutta, India with the loss of 52 lives. |
| Active | United States | The ship, or schooner, ran aground on the coast of Ireland sometime after leaving Liverpool on 27 February. She was refloated, repaired, and continued her voyage on 13 March. |
| Admiral Parker | Great Britain | The ship was wrecked on a reef whilst on a voyage from British Honduras to London. Her crew were rescued. |
| Adventure | United Kingdom | The ship was driven ashore. She was on a voyage from Arkangelsk, Russia to London. She was refloated and taken in to Drontheim, Norway. |
| HMS America | (Kingdom of Great Britain) Royal Navy | The Intrepid-class ship of the line was wrecked off Hispaniola. She was subsequently salvaged by the Spanish and used as a prison ship. |
| Anne | Great Britain | The ship was driven ashore on the coast of Africa and damaged. She was subsequently declared a total loss. Anne was on a voyage from Africa to the West Indies. |
| Argus | Great Britain | The ship was lost at Charleston, South Carolina, United States. She was on a voyage from Charleston to Liverpool, Lancashire. |
| Belfast | Ireland | The ship sprang a leak while on a voyage from Saint Kitts to London. She was set afire and abandoned. |
| Britannia | Great Britain | The ship was driven ashore in Buckler's Bay, Jamaica. |
| Brothers | Great Britain | The ship foundered while on a voyage from Jamaica to Glasgow, Renfrewshire. Her crew were rescued. |
| Burton | Great Britain | War of the Second Coalition: The ship was captured and burnt. She was on a voyage from Nevis to London. |
| Canada | Great Britain | The whaler was lost at South Georgia. |
| Catherina and Francis | Great Britain | The ship was wrecked on Marigalante Island while on a voyage from Bermuda to Martinique. |
| Charlotte | Great Britain | The ship was lost at Trinidada. |
| Charlotte | Great Britain | The ship ran aground and was wrecked at Grenada. Her crew were rescued. |
| Chato Murgo | Great Britain | The ship was wrecked on the coast of Africa. |
| Clyde | (Kingdom of Great Britain) Jamaica | The ship was wrecked in Montego Bay, Jamaica. |
| Commerce | Great Britain | The ship foundered. She was on a voyage from Liverpool to Boston. |
| Cornish Hero | Great Britain | The ship was wrecked at Martinique. She was on a voyage from Liverpool to the West Indies. |
| Doudswell | Great Britain | The ship was wrecked at New Providence, New Jersey, United States. Her crew were rescued. |
| Dispatch | Great Britain | War of the Second Coalition: The ship was captured by the French off Benin and sunk. |
| Dublin | British East India Company | The West Indiaman was lost. |
| Durham | Great Britain | The ship was lost at the Bahamas. She was on a voyage from Jamaica to London. |
| Eliza | Great Britain | The ship was foundered while on a voyage from Halifax, Nova Scotia, British North America to Barbados. Her crew were rescued. |
| Eliza and Adrane | United States | The ship capsized in a squall. Her ten crew survived. They were later rescued by the brig Jason ( (Kingdom of Great Britain) ) Saint Kitts. Eliza and Adrane was on a voyage from Wilmington, North Carolina to Martinique. |
| Enterprize | Great Britain | War of the Second Coalition: The ship was captured by the French off Benin and sunk. |
| Experiment | United States | The ship was driven ashore at New York. She was on a voyage from Jamaica to New York. |
| Francis | Great Britain | The ship was wrecked on Sable Island, Nova Scotia with the loss of all hands. She was on a voyage from London to Halifax. |
| Frederick Rocloff | Hamburg | The ship foundered while on a voyage from Hamburg to Charleston, South Carolina. |
| Friends Adventure | Great Britain | The ship foundered off the coast of British Honduras. |
| Good Friends | (Kingdom of Great Britain) Jersey | War of the Second Coalition: The ship was captured and sunk. She was on a voyage from Jersey to Newfoundland, British North America. |
| Grantham | Great Britain | The ship was wrecked on Medham's Shoal, off the coast of Barbados. |
| Hannah | Great Britain | War of the Second Coalition: The ship was captured and burnt by a French privateer. She was on a voyage from Bristol to Newfoundland. |
| Harmony | United States | The ship was wrecked on the east coast of Java. Her crew were rescued. |
| Hawke | United States | Quasi-War: The ship was captured and burnt by the French. She was on a voyage from Saint Barthélemy to New York. |
| Hector | Great Britain | The ship was wrecked on The Martyrs. She was on a voyage from Havana, Cuba to Nassau, Bahamas. |
| Hercules | British East India Company | The East Indiaman was severely damaged in a gale at Bombay, India. |
| Hind | Great Britain | War of the Second Coalition: The ship was captured at Lagos, Africa, by the French and burnt. |
| Humber | Great Britain | The brig was wrecked off Bermuda while on a voyage from New York to Barbados. |
| Iphigenia | United States | The ship was wrecked at Winter Quarter, Virginia while on a voyage from Virginia to Belfast, County Down, Ireland. |
| Jane and Sarah | Great Britain | War of the Second Coalition: The ship was captured by a French Navy frigate and sunk while on a voyage from Newfoundland to Lisbon, Portugal. |
| Jason | Great Britain | The ship foundered while on a voyage from Teignmouth, Devon to Newfoundland. Her crew were rescued. |
| John | Great Britain | The ship foundered while on a voyage from Baltimore, Maryland, United States to London. Her crew were rescued. |
| Juno | Great Britain | The ship was wrecked on Hog Island, Philadelphia, Pennsylvania, United States. She was on a voyage from Liverpool to Baltimore, Maryland, United States. |
| Lascelles | Great Britain | The ship was driven ashore in the Surinam River. She was on a voyage from Surinam to London. |
| Lord Henry | Great Britain | The ship foundered while on a voyage from Sicily to London. Her crew were rescued. |
| Lord Sheffield | Great Britain | The ship was wrecked at Jamaica. She was on a voyage from Jamaica to London. |
| Lucy | United States | The ship foundered while on a voyage from New York to Barbados. Her crew were rescued. |
| Mary | Great Britain | The brig foundered in the Grand Banks of Newfoundland (46°00′N 55°40′W). Her ten crew were rescued by Firm (Great Britain). |
| Maryann | Great Britain | The whaler was lost off Greenland. |
| Mary Ann | Great Britain | The ship was lost at Tobago. |
| Monmouth | Great Britain | The ship foundered while on a voyage from Grenada to London. Her crew were rescued. |
| Nereus | Great Britain | The ship foundered at Saint Kitts. |
| Norfolk | (Kingdom of Great Britain) Norfolk Island | The sloop was wrecked at Stockton, New South Wales. |
| Ocean | United States | The ship was wrecked on Long Island, New York. She was on a voyage from Bremen to New York City. |
| Pearl | Great Britain | The ship was lost whilst on a voyage from "Saloe" to Guernsey, Channel Islands. |
| Peggy & Betsey | Great Britain | The ship was lost off British Honduras. She was on a voyage from Charleston, South Carolina to British Honduras. |
| Priscilla Elizabeth | Great Britain | The ship foundered in the Atlantic Ocean while on a voyage from Tobago to Newcastle-upon-Tyne, Northumberland. |
| Recovery | Great Britain | The ship was driven ashore and wrecked on Tobago. |
| Sally | United States | The ship was driven ashore on the American coast. She was on a voyage from North Carolina to Málaga, Spain. |
| Sally and Ann | United States | The ship capsized off Bermuda. She was on a voyage from Virginia to Saint Vincent. |
| Speedwell | Great Britain | The transport ship was run down and sunk by another vessel off Tortola while on a voyage from Nevis to London. Her crew were rescued. |
| Susannah | United States | The ship was driven ashore on the Delaware River. She was on a voyage from Hamburg to Philadelphia, Pennsylvania. |
| Syren | France | The ship was lost off Guadeloupe. She was on a voyage from Bordeaux, Gironde to Saint Thomas, Virgin Islands and Saint-Domingue. |
| Tanner | United States | The ship ran aground on Martyr's Reef in the Gulf of Florida after being captured by a British frigate. |
| Tartar | Great Britain | War of the Second Coalition: The ship was captured by the French off Benin and sunk. |
| Three Friends | Great Britain | The ship foundered in the Atlantic Ocean. She was on a voyage from Liverpool to Savannah, Georgia, United States. |
| Venice | United States | The sloop, a slave ship, sank sometime before 5 April in the vicinity of Cuba. Her crew and 46 slaves were rescued by schooner "Austri". |
| Waalfaren | United States | The ship sprang a leak and was abandoned in the Atlantic Ocean. Her crew were rescued by a Danish ship. |
| Westmoreland | Great Britain | The ship was run down and sunk by Shah Ardaseer (Great Britain). Westmoreland was on a voyage from Newcastle upon Tyne to Grenada. |
| William and Henry | Great Britain | The ship foundered in the Grand Banks of Newfoundland. Her crew were rescued. She was on a voyage from Salem, Massachusetts, United States to a European port. |
| Winifred | Great Britain | The ship foundered in the Atlantic Ocean while on a voyage from Bristol, Gloucestershire to Philadelphia, Pennsylvania. Her crew were rescued. |
| Yeldham | Great Britain | The ship was lost at British Honduras. She was on a voyage from Liverpool to Jamaica. |
