= Bellona (1804 ship) =

History

United Kingdom
- Name: Bellona
- Builder: Spain
- Launched: 1797
- Acquired: 1804 by purchase of a prize
- Fate: Wrecked November 1806

General characteristics
- Tons burthen: 200, or 214, or 216 (bm)
- Complement: November 1804:40; December 1804:40; December 1805:30
- Armament: November 1804:4 × 9-pounder guns + 12 × 12-pounder carronades; December 1804:4 × 9-pounder guns + 12 × 12-pounder carronades; December 1805:4 × 9-pounder guns

Bellona was built in Spain in 1797 and was taken in prize circa late 1804. She made one voyage as a privateer, sailing from Liverpool to the River Plate area. On her return she made a voyage as a slave ship in the triangular trade in enslaved people. She was wrecked as she was coming back into Liverpool after having delivered her captives to Charleston.

== Career ==
Bellona first appeared in Lloyd's Register (LR) in the volume for 1805.

Year	Master	Owner	Trade	Source
1805	W.Donne	Brown & Co.	Liverpool–Africa	LR

Though the listing suggests that her owners intended to sail Bellona as on an enslaving voyage, she sailed as a privateer instead. On 27 November 1804 Captain Samuel Hensley acquired a letter of marque. Less than a month later, Captain William Dean acquired a letter of marque on 14 December.

Lloyd's List reported in September 1805 that Antelope had cruised for 14 days off the River Plate with Lucy, Ferguson, master, and Bellona, Dean, master. The size of the crews and the amount of armament suggest that all three were privateers. Antelope had sprung her foremast and was going to put into St Catherine's to repair. The information for the news came via Bellona. She had returned to Liverpool on 9 September 1805, "from a cruise".

Bellona owners published in Billinge's Advertiser on 30 September 1805, a correspondence with Captain Dean. Messers. Lake and Brown, of the Liverpool Packet Office stated that they and the owners were giving Dean a gift of £100, "notwithstanding that you have been unsuccessful" in recognition of his efforts on his last cruise. In response, Dean had written a letter thanking them.

Captain William Lace replaced Dean as master of Bellona and acquired a letter of marque on 16 December. He sailed from Liverpool on 1 February 1806, bound for Africa. Between 1 January 1806 and 1 May 1807, 185 vessels cleared Liverpool outward bound in the slave trade. Thirty of these vessels made two voyages during this period. Of the 155 vessels, 114 were regular slave ships, having made two voyages during the period, or voyages before 1806.

Bellona was reported to be well on 24 July at 2°36′N 58°34′W, coming from Africa. Later she was reported at Savannah from Africa, having lost her anchors and cable. She arrived at Charleston in September with some 233 captives. She sailed for Liverpool on 25 September.

== Fate ==
As Bellona, Lace, master, was arriving at Liverpool from Charleston, she ran ashore at "the Rock". The next report was that she had gone ashore at the Hoyle Bank and was totally lost. Her crew was saved.

In 1806, some 33 British vessels were lost while in the triangular trade, however, the source of this statistic did not recognize any losses on the homeward-bound leg of the voyages. Accounts of Bellona's loss did not report that she was a returning Guineaman. Still, during the period 1793 to 1807, war, rather than maritime hazards or resistance by the captives, was the greatest cause of vessel losses among British enslaving vessels.
