= Rachel (1795 ship) =

History

Great Britain
- Name: Rachel
- Owner: Prothero
- Builder: Bristol
- Launched: 1795
- Fate: Wrecked 7 July 1811

General characteristics
- Tons burthen: 270 (bm)
- Sail plan: Brig

Rachel (or Rachael) was launched at Bristol in 1795. She spent most of her career as a constant trader, sailing to and from Nevis. A French privateer captured her in 1803 but a Liverpool letter of marque quickly recaptured her. She was wrecked in July 1811.

== Career ==
Rachael first appeared in Lloyd's Register (LR) in 1795. Subsequently, she made eleven voyages to Nevis.

Year	Master	Owner	Trade	Source
1795	Murray	Prothero	Bristol–Saint Kitts	LR
1800	Vernam (Vernon); T.Powell	Prothero	Bristol–Nevis	LR
1802	T.Powel; G. Cooper	Prothero	Bristol–Nevis	LR

Lloyd's List (LL) reported on 15 July 1803 that Rachael, Cooper, master, had been taken and retaken, while on her way from Nevis to Bristol. She had arrived at Liverpool. The capture had been off Cape Clear, and her recaptor was a Liverpool letter of marque.

Year	Master	Owner	Trade	Source
1805	G.Cooper; W.Scarth	Prothero	Bristol–Nevis	LR
1810	S.Bell, jr.	Claxton & Company	Bristol–Nevis	LR
1811	S.Bell, jr. J.Powell	Claxton & Company	Bristol–Nevis	LR

== Fate ==
Rachel, Power, master, was at Nevis when a gale hit the island between 6 and 9 July 1811. She herself was wrecked on 7 July; her crew was saved.
