= Antelope (1798 ship) =

French-built ship, launched 1795

History

France
- Launched: 1795
- Captured: 1798

Great Britain
- Name: Antelope
- Acquired: 1798 by purchase of a prize
- Captured: 13 October 1805

General characteristics
- Tons burthen: 186, or 187, or 190 (bm)
- Complement: 1799:35; 1800:30; 1805:50
- Armament: 1799:2 × 6-pounder guns + 14 × 9-pounder carronades; 1800:2 × 6-pounder guns + 14 × 9-pounder brass guns of the "New Construction"; 1805:14 × 6&12-pounder cannons

Antelope was a French vessel launched in 1795 that the British captured circa 1798. She sailed primarily as a West Indiaman until circa 1804 when Daniel Bennett purchased her and sent her out as a privateer operating off South America, first in the Atlantic and then the Pacific. A Spanish armed merchantman captured her in 1805, in a single ship action that resulted in the death of Antelope's master. A Spanish merchant then sent Antelope to Spain.

== West Indiaman ==
Antelope first appeared in Lloyd's Register (LR) in 1799. The surveyors designated her "AN" – almost new, i.e., less than three years old.

Captain Robert Younghusband acquired a letter of marque on 6 June 1799, and sailed from Deal for Demerara on 18 June. From Demerara she sailed to Surinam.

Year	Master	Owner	Trade	Source
1799	Younghusband	Gale & Co.	London–Demerara	LR
1800	Younghusband; Ashton; Pashley	Gale & Co.	London–Demerara	LR

Captain John Pashley acquired a letter of marque on 26 July 1805.

Year	Master	Owner	Trade	Source
1802	Pashley; J.Patterson	Gale & Co. Patterson	London–Demerara	LR
1803	JPatterson; W.Attwood	Patterson; Gellispie	London–Charleston	LR

== Privateer ==
Samuel Bennett purchased Antelope in 1804, and her first master for him appears to have been John Samuel Parker. She only appeared under Bennett's ownership in the Register of Shipping for 1806 (and never in LR), it gives her trade as London–Southern Fishery.

Year	Master	Owner	Trade	Source
1806	Mortlock	D.Bennett	London–Southern Fishery	RS

On 10 January 1805, Captain James Mortlock acquired a letter of marque. (Note: Between 1794 and 1796, Mortlock had been captain of Young William. In her he had sailed to Australia, up to China, and back to England.) Although Bennett owned whaling ships and Antelope sailed for the South Seas, she was a privateer, not a whaler.

An Antelope and Lucy, both listed as privateers, were at Portsmouth on 25 January. Antelope may have returned to London because she was listed as being at Deal on 28 February, waiting to sail to the South Seas.

Lloyd's List reported in September that Antelope had cruised for 14 days off the River Plate with Lucy, Ferguson, master, and Bellona, Dean, master. Both were privateers. Alexander Ferguson had received a letter of marque on 10 January 1805. (Note: Lucy, of 345 tons (bm), was armed with eighteen 9&18-pounder cannons, and had a crew of 60 men.) Dean had received one on 14 December 1804. (Note: Bellona, of 200 tons (bm), was armed with four 9-pounder guns and twelve 12-pounder carronades. She had a crew of 40.) Antelope had sprung her foremast and was going to put into St Catherine's to repair. The information for the news came via Bellona, which had returned to Liverpool.

In April 1806, Lloyd's List reported that Antelope, Mortlock, master, and Kitty, Musgrave, master, were well in October 1805, off the coast of South America. Thomas Musgrave had received a letter of marque on 5 February 1805. (Note: Kitty, of 320 tons, was armed with twenty-two 9&18&24-pounder cannons and 6 swivel guns, and had a crew of 100 men.)

Antelope had left England in company with another privateer, possibly Lucy. In her cruise near Montevideo Antelope took five prizes and forced the Spanish warship Asuncion aground in bad weather. Mortlock dispatched his companion privateer back to England with the prizes, and decided to round Cape Horn to look for prizes off Callao.

Near Valparaiso Antelope captured two launches that she relieved of their stores. At Coquimbo, Mortlock looted a church and some farms. In sight of the island of San Gallao he seized two guano brigs, took their spars for firewood, removed their compasses, and prevented them from entering Callao and alerting the authorities to his presence. (Apparently Mortlock did dissuade his crew from scuttling the two brigs with all hands.)

== Fate ==
On 13 October, Antelope was some eight leagues from the island of San Lorenzo when she encountered Nuestra Senora de Isiar (alias Joaquina), Don Domingo de Ugalde, master. She had a crew of 70, fourteen 8-pounder cannon and two ‘howitzers’ (possibly obusier de vaisseau. Her cargo consisted of 150 black slaves shackled below deck, and cargo worth a million pesos belonging to the King of Spain and private individuals. She had left Callao on 24 December 1804; the outbreak of war between Spain and England had led de Ugalde to decide to return to Callao.

Around 7pm an engagement developed with an exchange of gunfire at short range. Antelope repelled Joaquina's first attempt to board but succumbed to the second. In the fight Antelope suffered 15 men killed, Mortlake among them, and 16 wounded, most mortally. Joaquina had four dead and 14 wounded, of whom four were mortally wounded. A later account gives the casualties as Mortlake and four of his men killed, 15 wounded. Joaquin's casualties were four men killed and 14 men wounded. The same account gives Antelope's armament as ten 12-pounder carronades, five 6-pounder guns, and one 3-pounder bronze gun.

The prize court valued Antelope at 100,000 pesos. She was apparently brought back into mercantile service on the Pacific Coast. (Note: One source suggests that she may have been the Antelope, of 70 tons pierced for 10 guns that the British captured on 21 December 1807, when they captured Saint Thomas. However, Antelope is a common name and the discrepancy in size and armament between the two vessels is substantial.)

In October 1805, Viceroy Avilés ordered Antelope be transferred to the shipowner Javier María de Aguirre. Aguirre dispatched Antelope to Santander on 24 December.

Lloyd's List reported on 15 July 1806, that an armed Spanish ship had captured Antelope, of London, Mortlock, master, off the coast of Peru. It also reported that Mortlock had been killed.
