= HMS Curlew (1795) =

Sloop of the Royal Navy

- Curlew

History

Great Britain
- Name: HMS Curlew
- Ordered: 4 & 18 March 1795
- Builder: John Randall & Co., Rotherhithe
- Laid down: May 1795
- Launched: 16 July 1795
- Commissioned: 22 July – 29 August 1795
- Fate: Lost 1796

General characteristics
- Class & type: Diligence-class brig-sloop
- Type: 18-gun brig-sloop
- Tons burthen: 316 41/94 (bm)
- Length: 95 ft 1 in (29.0 m) (gundeck); 75 ft 2 1/2 in (22.9 m) (gundeck)
- Beam: 28 ft 1 1/2 in (8.6 m)
- Depth of hold: 12 ft 0 in (3.7 m)
- Sail plan: brig
- Complement: 121
- Armament: 16 × 32-pounder carronades; 2 × 6-pounder chase guns

HMS Curlew was an 18-gun brig-sloop of the Royal Navy, commissioned in June 1795 under Commander Francis Ventris Field for Admiral Duncan's fleet.

On 31 October 1796 she disappeared during a storm in the North Sea, and was presumed to have foundered with all hands.
