= HMS Kangaroo (1795) =

British Royal Navy Diligence-class brig-sloop

- Plans of HMS Kangaroo

History

Great Britain
- Name: HMS Kangaroo
- Ordered: 13 July 1795
- Builder: John and William Wells, Deptford
- Laid down: July 1795
- Launched: 30 September 1795
- Commissioned: October 1795
- Fate: February 1802 sold to be broken up

General characteristics
- Class & type: Diligence-class 18-gun brig-sloop
- Tons burthen: 31820/94 (bm)
- Length: 95 ft 1 in (29.0 m) (gundeck); 75 ft 2 1/2 in (22.9 m) (gundeck)
- Beam: 28 ft 2 1/2 in (8.6 m)
- Depth of hold: 12 ft 0 in (3.7 m)
- Sail plan: brig
- Complement: 121
- Armament: 16 × 32-pounder carronades; 2 × 6-pounder chase guns

HMS Kangaroo was British Royal Navy 18-gun brig-sloop of the Diligence class, launched in 1795 at Deptford, England. She served in Home Waters and the Mediterranean Sea until she was sold in 1802.

== Career ==
In October 1795 she was commissioned under Commander Courtenay Boyle. Kangaroo shared in the capture on 10 May 1796, of Marie, which Kingsfisher had captured.

On 13 June 1796, Kangaroo destroyed a French privateer of unknown name. (Note: A first class share of the prize money was worth £43 17s; a fifth class share, that of a seaman, was worth 6s 0¼d.)

In February 1797 at Plymouth she detained St Croix, from St Croix. St Croix was formerly Cadiz Packet, of Belfast. On the evening of 9 April, Kangaroo captured the French privateer cutter Sophie, some two leagues (9.7 km) south east of The Lizard. Sophie, of fourteen 4-pounder guns (eight of which she had thrown overboard during the chase), and 40 men, was two days into her maiden cruise from Brest and had made no captures. That month Kangaroo sailed from Plymouth as escort to the transport Boyne.

On 3 July Kangaroo captured some 17 leagues (82 km) off Cádiz the lugger Purissima Concepcione, which had on board an officer and nine men, and which was searching for a brig from Havana to deliver some despatches to her. Then on the 22nd, Kangaroo captured the French privateer lugger Surprise, of 48 tons (bm), eight guns, and 47 men. Surprise was eight days out of Crosic at the entrance to the Loire, but had made no captures. (Note: Surprise had been commissioned in 1797, but French records do not show her homeport. She cruised with 8 guns and 48 men from June 1797 Kangaroo captured her on 22 June.) Also in July Kangaroo recaptured Macaroni. On 30 June Boyle received promotion to post captain and Commander Edward Brace replaced Boyle, but not until Kangaroo returned to port after capturing Surprise.

In September, Kangaroo recaptured and sent into Cork Jenny, M'Iver, master. A privateer had captured Jenny as she was sailing from Cork to Lisbon.

On 28 September, Kangaroo, Cerberus, and Diana recaptured Graaf Bernstorff and captured San Norberto. Graff Bernstorff was carrying a cargo of iron and grain from St. Michael's to Lisbon when she was captured. San Norberta was a Spanish privateer armed with four carriage guns plus some swivels, and had a crew of 42 men.

One year later, on 18 September 1798, Kangaroo recaptured Endeavour.

Early in October, Kangaroo brought dispatches that led Captain Sir John Borlase Warren in Canada to take a squadron to search for and intercept a French force sailing to Ireland. The British and French squadrons met up on 12 October in the Battle of Tory Island, which the British won. Several French vessels escaped and Kangaroo joined in the pursuit. On 15 October Mermaid and Kangaroo pursued the French frigate Loire, but lost her in the dark. Next morning the two British vessels spotted Loire on the horizon and set off in pursuit. Loire outran Mermaid, but not Kangaroo, which exchanged fire with her quarry at a distance. In the exchange the out-gunned Kangaroo suffered damage to her rigging and had to fall back. However, Kangaroo had damaged Loire too. The next day Mermaid eventually engaged Loire, but suffered damage that enabled Loire to escape once again. On 18 October, Loire had the misfortune to encounter the rasée frigate (ex ship-of-the-line) Anson, in company with Kangaroo. As Anson and Loire engaged, Kangaroo closed on Loire's unprotected stern, firing as she did so, repeatedly raking the immobile French ship. Loire's mizzenmast fell, and by midday she was forced to surrender to a boat from Kangaroo. Kangaroo then assisted Anson by taking possession of Loire.

On 2 July 1799 Phoebe and Kangaroo captured Nancy (aka St Joseph, aka Santa Margaretha). Twenty-two days later, Kangaroo recaptured the brig Triton.

On 22 February 1800 Kangaroo recaptured Minerva, an American ship carrying a cargo of tobacco, that a French privateer had captured as Minerva sailed from Virginia to London. Kangaroo would send Minerva, Tallman, master, into Cork. That same day, Kangaroo captured the French privateer brig Telegraph, which had earlier captured Minerva. Telegraph was quite new, armed with 14 guns of various calibers, and had a crew of 78 men. Telegraph was 20 days out of Saint-Malo and on the 11th had captured the brig Elizabeth, which had been carrying a cargo of fruit. The only British casualty was First Lieutenant Thomas Toulerton, who was injured while aiming a chase gun. Lieutenant Tompson then sailed Telegraph to Cork. (Note: Télégraphe was a 136-ton ("of load") privateer from Saint-Malo, in 1799 or 1800 under a Captain N. Guillemin. She carried 14 guns and between 78 and 91 men.)

Two days later Kangaroo recaptured the ship Chance, of London, which had been sailing from Martinique when the French privateer Bellegrande had captured her. Phoebe had captured Bellegrande three days earlier. (Note: Baalgade (mistakenly spelled "Bellegarde" in some documents), was a 166-ton ("of load") privateer from Saint-Malo commissioned in February 1798. Her first cruise, under a Captain P. Kerpoisson with 69 men, occurred from February 1799. She made another cruise from November. Captain F. Leconte sailed her on third cruise from March 1800 with 115 men and 14 guns.)

Then early in the morning of 25 February Kangaroo encountered and engaged a French privateer brig of 18 guns. The fight lasted about an hour before the French vessel was able to make her escape. Kangaroo was damaged in her rigging so unable to pursue. Kangaroo was also short-handed, having 44 men away in prizes, six men unable to man their stations, six men wounded in the encounter, and four men standing guard over 78 French prisoners in her hold. (That is, almost half her official complement was hors de combat.) French prisoners on Telegraph later reported that the privateer that escaped was Grand Decide, of eighteen 12-pounder guns and 150 men. (Note: Grand Décidé was a privateer from Bordeaux commissioned in February 1799 under Duchêne, also spelled Duchesne-Lasalle (who went by the nickname of "Black Privateer"), with 220 men and 22 guns.) When Kangaroo recaptured Chance, she freed two British army officers who then helped in the action with the privateer.

Phoebe and Kangaroo also recaptured the brig Young William.

In March 1800, Kangaroo captured a French 16-gun privateer from Brest off the coast of Ireland.

Brace received promotion to post captain on 2 April 1800, with the result that Commander George Charles Pulling replaced him.

Phoebe, Nereide, and Kangaroo shared in the proceeds of the capture, on 5 June of Eagle.

Because Kangaroo served in the navy's Egyptian campaign (8 March to 8 September 1801), her officers and crew qualified for the clasp "Egypt" to the Naval General Service Medal, which the Admiralty issued in 1847 to all surviving claimants.

During this period, on 16 May, Kangaroo recaptured Dolphin Wreck. Then Kangaroo was patrolling off Barcelona when she met up with the brig Speedy, under Commander Lord Cochrane on 1 June. They encountered a privateer from Menorca that informed them that she had sighted a Spanish convoy of 12 vessels and five escorts three days earlier. The two British brigs set out to try to catch up with the convoy.

=== Raid on Oropesa ===
One week later, on 8 June, they attacked and blew up the tower of Almanara. The tower was armed with only two 4-pounder guns, but refused to surrender. Cochrane and two men were lightly wounded during the demolition. Cochrane reported that they also brought off a Spanish privateer of seven guns.

The next morning Speedy found the convoy sheltering under the guns of a battery at Oropeso. The battery consisted of a large, square tower armed with some 12 guns. The escorts consisted of a xebec of 20 guns, and three gunboats. Cochrane anchored offshore and wanted to wait until night to send in a cutting out party. However, Kangaroo arrived and Pulling, as the senior commander, decided to wait until the next morning.

On the morning of the 9th, the two British vessels anchored within gunshot and by mid-afternoon had sunk the xebec and two gunboats. A felucca of 12 guns and two more gunboats joined the defenders.

By 6:30pm the fire from the Spanish defenders slackened and Kangaroo came in close to the tower, silencing its fire by 7pm. At the same time, Speedy engaged the felucca and the surviving gunboats, which then fled. The British continued to undergo small arms fire from the shore until midnight, at which time the boats from the two brigs went in and brought out three Spanish brigs carrying wine, rice, and bread. Cochrane then went in with the boats for a second try, but the British found that all their quarry were either sunk or driven ashore. The next day Kangaroo and Speedy sailed for Menorca with their prizes; Pulling stated that they had expended all their ammunition, otherwise they would have reduced the tower as well. This was not an idle boast as Pulling wrote his report while anchored some 250 yards from the shore and 500 from the town. Speedy had expended some 1400 shot and had less than a broadside left. In the action Kangaroo lost a midshipman killed, and five seamen severely, and two lieutenants and three seamen slightly wounded; Speedy had no casualties.

Cochrane also recounted that several of the cannon aboard Kangaroo were fitted on the non-recoil principle. During the action several of these burst their breechings, i.e., came loose. One endangered Kangaroo by bounding down the hatchway into the hold.

On 29 September, Kangaroo captured the Greek polacre Madona d'Idra.

== Fate ==
In February 1802 the Admiralty offered Kangaroo for sale at Deptford. She was sold that month.

== Bibliography ==
- Demerliac, Alain (1999). La Marine de la Révolution: Nomenclature des Navires Français de 1792 A 1799 (in French). Éditions Ancre. ISBN 2-906381-24-1.
- Lewis, Jon (2014). The Mammoth Book of Pirates. Constable & Robinson.
- Marshall, John (1824). "Brace, Edward" . Royal Naval Biography. Vol. 2, part 1. London: Longman and Company. p. 253-261.
- Winfield, Rif (2008). British Warships in the Age of Sail 1793–1817: Design, Construction, Careers and Fates. Seaforth Publishing. ISBN 978-1-86176-246-7.
