= HMS Hound (1796) =

Brig-sloop of the Royal Navy

- Plan of Hound

History

Great Britain
- Name: HMS Hound
- Ordered: 4 & 18 March 1795
- Builder: Thomas Hills, Sandwich
- Laid down: May 1795
- Launched: 24 May 1796
- Commissioned: 16 May - 19 July 1796
- Fate: Lost 26 September 1800

General characteristics
- Class & type: Diligence-class 18-gun brig-sloop
- Tons burthen: 31534/94 (bm)
- Length: 95 ft 0 in (29.0 m) (gundeck); 75 ft 2 in (22.9 m) (gundeck)
- Beam: 28 ft 1 in (8.6 m)
- Depth of hold: 12 ft 0 in (3.7 m)
- Sail plan: brig
- Complement: 121
- Armament: 16 × 32-pounder carronades; 2 × 6-pounder chase guns

HMS Hound was a brig-sloop of the Royal Navy. She had a short history. After her launch in 1796 she captured two privateers and destroyed a third before she was lost in 1800.

== Career ==
The brig-sloop was commissioned in April 1796 under Commander John Wood for the North Sea.

In 1797, Hound was at Spithead and was caught up in the Spithead and Nore mutinies. A former member of her crew, Richard Parker, was the "President of the Delegates of the Fleet", i.e., the leader of the mutiny, and Wood testified at Parker's trial.

On 26 March 1798, Hound detained the Danish brig Charlotte Juliana.

Hound and the hired armed cutter Black Joke captured Minerva on 16 May.

On 14 June 1798 Hound encountered and captured the Dutch privateer lugger Seahound (or Zeehound) some 10 leagues (48 km) off the Skaw. Seahound was pierced for 14 guns but only had five mounted. She also had four swivel guns and a crew of 30 men. She was six weeks out of Holland.

On 23 June 1799 Hound encountered and captured the French privateer lugger Hirondelle, off the Skaw. Hirondelle was armed with five guns and two swivel guns, and had a crew of 26 men. She was three weeks from Dunkirk but had captured nothing.

Two days later, acting on information he had received of a large privateer cruising in the Bite or off the Skaw, Wood fell in with a large lugger that mounted 16 guns. After a chase of 14 hours, Hound succeeded in shooting away the lugger's main mast and driving her ashore between Robsnout and Hartshall. The wind was driving a heavy sea on the beach, with the result that it soon dashed the lugger to pieces, and probably cost many of the lugger's crew their lives. Wood was pleased to have destroyed his quarry however, as she was one of the largest and fastest vessels on the coast and when he encountered her was trailing a British convoy from the Baltic.

In the late summer-early autumn, Hound took part in the Helder expedition, a joint Anglo-Russian invasion of Holland under the command of Vice-Admiral Andrew Mitchell. At the Nieuw Diep, the British captured seven warships and 13 Indiamen and transports. (Note: Prize money to a seaman for these vessels amounted to 6s and 8d.) Mitchell then obtained the surrender of a squadron of the navy of the Batavian Republic in the Vlieter Incident. The Dutch surrendered twelve vessels ranging in size from the 74-gun Washington down to the 16-gun brig Galathea.

Commander William Turquand replaced Wood in April 1800.

Hound and Jaloue captured the cutter Rover on 10 May. That month Hound also captured the dogger Zeelust.

== Loss ==
In September 1800 Hound was put into Brassy Sound in the Shetland Islands to transport 45 Dutch fishermen who had been taken as prisoners of war. On 25 September she put to sea in company with Eliza, a small merchant vessel carrying mail to Aberdeen. The weather was turning poor with strong south-southeasterly winds and heavy rain. On 27 September Eliza returned to Brassy Sound alone, her crew reporting they had lost sight of Hound in a storm and had turned back for their own safety. In the following days, Shetland farmers on the islands of Unst and Balta reported various items washed ashore, including pieces of a ship's hull, books and papers, and a cow belonging to Hound's purser, which was identifiable by marks cut into its horns. There was no further sign of the ship, and it was presumed that Hound had foundered on 26 September while attempting to make port in Balty, with the loss of all hands.
