= Trojan (1795 ship) =

Great Britain
- Name: Trojan
- Builder: Simon Temple, South Shields
- Launched: 1795, Newcastle-upon-Tyne
- Fate: Wrecked 1802

General characteristics
- Tons burthen: 386, or 387 (bm)
- Armament: 10 × 6-pounder guns

Trojan was launched at Newcastle in 1795. She made one voyage, to the Cape of Good Hope, under charter to the British East India Company (EIC). She then became a West Indiaman. She was wrecked in December 1802.

== Career ==
Trojan enters Lloyd's Register in 1796 under the name Trajan, with E. Redman, master, S. Temple, owner, and trade London-Cape of Good Hope.

EIC voyage (1796-1797): Edward Redman sailed from Portsmouth 12 April 1796, bound for the Cape. Trojan reached the Cape on 12 August and left on 1 October. She reached Saint Helena on 14 October and arrived at The Downs on 15 February 1797.

On her return she became a West Indiaman. On 24 December 1802, Lloyd's List reported that Trojan, Mann, master, from Newcastle to Jamaica, was on shore at Deal beach. It was feared that she would be lost.

Trojan was last listed in the Register of Shipping in 1802. She continued to appear in Lloyd's Register to 1807, but with information unchanged since 1801.

Year	Master	Owner	Trade
1797	G.Denny	S.Temple	London–Jamaica
1801	Dennery; Meriton	Baring & Co. Agazias	London–Jamaica; London–Martinique
1807	Meriton	Agazias	London–Martinique
