= Brunswick (1795 ship) =

Ship launched at Newcastle in 1795

History

Great Britain
- Name: Brunswick
- Owner: 1795:Hurry & Co., Howden Pans, Newcastle upon Tyne; 1797:Wedderburn; 1809:Reeve & Co; 1810:Penton & Co.
- Builder: Hurry & Co.
- Launched: 7 February 1795
- Fate: Foundered 21 or 27 July 1809

General characteristics
- Tons burthen: 480, or 484, or 485, or 486 (bm)
- Length: 119 ft 0 in (36.3 m)
- Beam: 31 ft 8 in (9.7 m)
- Propulsion: Sail
- Complement: 40
- Armament: 1795:12 × 6-pounder guns; 1809:10 × 18-pounder carronades

Brunswick was launched at Newcastle in 1795. She made one voyage as an "extra ship", i.e., under charter, to the British East India Company (EIC). She then traded generally until she foundered in 1809.

== Career ==
Brunswick enters Lloyd's Register in 1795 with G. Ryland, master, Hurry & Co., owners, and trade London–India. Captain George Ryland acquired a letter of marque on 3 September 1795.

Captain Ryland sailed from The Downs on 23 September 1795. Brunswick reached Calcutta on 12 April 1796. Homeward bound, she was at Saugor on 28 July, reached St Helena on 22 November, and arrived at Long Reach on 17 February 1797.

On her return from India Hurry & Co. sold Brunswick and she became a West Indiaman. (Note: Hackman reports that Brunswick made a second voyage to Bengal for the EIC between 1799 and 1802, but there is no trace of such a voyage in, or the British Library on-line listing of East Indiamen, or Lloyd's Register, or the Register of Shipping.)

Year	Master	Owner	Trade	Notes & source
1797	G.Ryland; J.Savage	Hurry & Co. Wedderburn	London–East Indies; London−Jamaica	Lloyd's Register (LR)
1799	J. Savage; R. Hill	Wederburn	London−Jamaica	LR
1800	R. Hill	Wederburn	London−Jamaica	Register of Shipping (RS)
1801	R.Hill; Drysdale	Wederburn	London−Jamaica	LR
1802	Drysdale	Wederburn	London−Jamaica	RS
1803	Drysdale	Wedderburn	London−Jamaica	LR

On 1 May 1804 Lloyd's List reported that Brunswick, Drysdale, master, had had to put back to Portsmouth having lost her mainmast and having suffered other damage. She had left the convoy on 25 April at 46°N 10°W. The convoy was under the escort of the brig HMS Busy.

== Fate ==
The Register of Shipping for 1810 shows Brunswick with Simpson, master, Penton & Co., owners, and trade London transport.

Brunswick, Simpson, master, foundered in the Grand Banks of Newfoundland on either 21 or 27 July 1809 (sources disagree) while sailing from London to Quebec. Her crew were rescued. (Note: Weatherill states that Brunswick, George Simpson, master, T. Benson, owner, was lost in 1811.)
