= Mentor (1799 ship) =

History

Great Britain
- Builder: Spain
- Acquired: 1799 by purchase of a prize
- Fate: Foundered 22 October 1800

General characteristics
- Tons burthen: 517, or 527 (bm)
- Complement: 60
- Armament: 24 × 9-pounder guns

Mentor was a Spanish prize captured in 1799. She made one voyage as a slave ship in the triangular trade in enslaved people. She foundered on her way back to Liverpool after delivering her captives.

== Career ==
On 12 May 1799, Mentor, Gilbert Curry, master, acquired a letter of marque. She first appeared in Lloyd's Register (LR) in 1799.

Year	Master	Owner	Trade	Source & notes
1799	G.Curry	A.Joseph	Liverpool–Africa	LR; repairs 1799

Captain Curry sailed from Liverpool on 24 June 1799, bound for West Africa. Mentor gathered her captives at Bonny. She arrived at Kingston, Jamaica on 2 May 1800 with 651 captives. She sailed from Kingston on 21 July, bound for Liverpool.

== Fate ==
On 22 September Mentor, Currie, master, foundered on her way to Liverpool. Hope rescued the crew and brought them to Liverpool.

In 1800, 34 British slave ships were lost; four were lost on their way home after having disembarked their captives. Although Mentor was lost to the perils of the sea, during the period 1793 to 1807, war, rather than maritime hazards or slave resistance was the greatest cause of vessel losses among British slave vessels.
