= HMS Weymouth (1795) =

History

Great Britain
- Name: Earl of Mansfield
- Operator: East India Company
- Builder: Wells & Co. Rotherhithe
- Fate: Sold on stocks to Royal Navy

Great Britain
- Name: HMS Weymouth
- Builder: Wells & Co. Rotherhithe
- Launched: 30 September 1795
- Acquired: By purchase on the stocks
- Commissioned: Never
- In service: 1796
- Fate: Wrecked 21 January 1800

General characteristics
- Class & type: Fourth rate
- Tons burthen: 1416, or 143356/94 (bm)
- Length: 175 ft 6 in (53.5 m) (overall); 144 ft 1 in (43.9 m) (keel)
- Beam: 43 ft 3 in (13.2 m)
- Depth of hold: 19 ft 7 in (6.0 m)
- Propulsion: Sails
- Sail plan: Full-rigged ship
- Complement: 344 (Fourth rate)
- Armament: Fourth rate: Lower deck (LD): 28 × 18-pounder guns; Upper deck (UD): 28 × 32-pounder carronades; Transport: 26 guns

HMS Weymouth was laid down as the East Indiaman Earl of Mansfield. The British Royal Navy purchased her on the stocks to use as a 56-gun fourth rate. She was launched in 1795 but never was commissioned in the Royal Navy. She was transferred in February 1796 to the Transportation Board as a transport. Lieutenant Robert Passmore took command in June 1796. Commander Charles Ryder succeeded Passmore in July 1798, and Commander Ambrose Crofton replaced Ryder in August 1799.

Having sailed from Portsmouth, she was wrecked on 21 January 1800 on the bar in the Tagus on the coast of Portugal as Crofton was attempting to sail her into Lisbon harbour. Her crew was saved.
