= Diligence-class brig-sloop =

- Drawing showing the inboard profile, upper deck, lower deck with hold and platform for the Diligence-class ships

Class overview
- Name: Diligence-class brig-sloop
- Operators: Royal Navy
- In service: 1795 - 1817
- Completed: 8

General characteristics
- Type: Brig-sloop
- Tons burthen: 313 59/94 (bm)
- Length: 95 ft 0 in (29.0 m) (gundeck); 75 ft 2 1/2 in (22.9 m) (keel)
- Beam: 28 ft 0 in (8.5 m)
- Depth of hold: 12 ft 0 in (3.7 m)
- Sail plan: Brig-rigged
- Complement: 121
- Armament: 2 × 6-pounder cannon as bow chasers; 16 × 32-pounder carronades

The Diligence class were built as a class of eight 18-gun brig-sloops for the Royal Navy. They were originally to have carried sixteen 6-pounder carriage guns, but on 22 April 1795 it was instructed that they should be armed with sixteen 32-pounder carronades, although two of the 6-pounders were retained as chase guns in the bows. Consequently they were classed as 18-gun sloops. However, in service it was found that this armament proved too heavy for these vessels, and so in most vessels the 32-pounder carronades were replaced by 24-pounder ones.

Of the eight vessels in the class, three foundered at sea with the loss of their crews, and one was wrecked. The others continued in service until withdrawn.

One of the Surveyors of the Navy - John Henslow - designed the class. The Admiralty approved the design on 22 April 1795, and ordered five vessels on 4 March 1795; their names were assigned and registered on 20 June. The Admiralty ordered three more in July 1795; these were named and registered on 28 August.

== Construction ==
In early 1795 the Admiralty identified the need for additional brig-sloops to meet the urgent need for convoy duties, and - as per their usual practice - commissioned two different designs, one from each Surveyor. Five vessels to each design were ordered in March 1795, with a further three to each design following in July.

Two of the first orders (Curlew and Seagull) were constructed of "fir" (actually, pine), while the other three were of the normal oak construction. The three ordered in July were all also of fir construction. Fir-built vessels could be constructed more rapidly; hence all five of these were launched by the end of October 1795, when the three built of the conventional oak were still all on the stocks. However, it was recognised that fir hulls deteriorated faster; the use of fir was seen as a stop-gap measure to get them faster into service, but with the knowledge that they would not last as long.

== Ships ==
Name	Launched	Fate
Curlew	16 July 1795	Lost, presumed to have foundered in a storm in the North Sea in December 1796.
Diligence	24 November 1795	Wrecked off Cuba on 8 October 1800.
Seagull	July 1795	Lost, presumed to have foundered in the Channel in February 1805.
Harpy	February 1796	Sold to be broken up on 10 September 1817.
Hound	24 March 1796	Lost, presumed to have foundered in a storm in the Shetland Islands on 26 September 1800.
Kangaroo	30 September 1795	Sold to be broken up in February 1802.
Cameleon	14 October 1795	Sold to be broken up in April 1811.
Racoon	14 October 1795	Sold to be broken up in April 1806.
