= List of ship launches in 1755 =

The list of ship launches in 1755 includes a chronological list of some ships launched in 1755.

Date	Ship	Class	Builder	Location	Country	Notes
14 February	Medway	Medway-class ship of the line	Sir Thomas Slade	Deptford Dockyard	Great Britain	For Royal Navy.
22 June	Firme	Africa-class ship of the line	Arsenal de la Carraca	Cádiz	Spain	For Spanish Navy.
7 July	Iupiter	Bomb vessel	Kronong	Saint Petersburg	Russia	For Imperial Russian Navy.
12 July	Le Duc de Berry	East Indiaman	Nicholas Levesque	Lorient	Kingdom of France	For Compagnie des Indes.
23 July	Hector	Hector-class ship of the line	Joseph-Marie Blaise Coulomb	Toulon	Kingdom of France	For French Navy.
20 August	Sphinx	Sphinx-class ship of the line	Pierre Salinoc	Brest	Kingdom of France	For French Navy.
7 September	Brune	Blonde-class frigate		Havre de Grâce	Kingdom of France	For French Navy.
22 September	Hector	Third rate	Guillermo Turner	Reales Astilleros de Esteiro, Ferrol	Spain	For Spanish Navy.
27 September	Revenge	East Indiaman		Bombay	India	For British East India Company.
29 September	Caernarvon	East Indiaman	John Wells	Deptford	Great Britain	For British East India Company.
1 October	Vaillant	Third rate	Noel Pomet	Toulon	Kingdom of France	For French Navy.
20 October	Bretonne	Galley	Claude Saucillon	Brest	Kingdom of France	For French Navy.
21 October	Cambridge	Third rate	Adam Hayes	Deptford Dockyard	Great Britain	For Royal Navy.
21 October	Ventura	Sixth rate	Matthew Mullins	Cádiz	Spain	For Spanish Navy.
23 October	Le Moras	Duc de Penthière-class East Indiaman	Gilles Cambry	Lorient	Kingdom of France	For Compagnie des Indes.
23 October	Squirrel	Sixth rate	Edward Allin	Woolwich	Great Britain	For Royal Navy.
4 December	Plymouth	Yacht	Israel Pownoll	Plymouth Dockyard	Great Britain	For Royal Navy.
Unknown date	Chaloupe Canonniere No. 1	Gunboat	Elzear de Sabran-Grammont	Toulon	Kingdom of France	For French Navy.
Unknown date	Chaloupe Canonniere No. 2	Gunboat	Elzear de Sabran-Grammont	Toulon	Kingdom of France	For French Navy.
Unknown date	Chaloupe Canonniere No. 3	Gunboat	Elzear de Sabran-Grammont	Toulon	Kingdom of France	For French Navy.
Unknown date	Chaloupe Canonniere No. 4	Gunboat	Elzear de Sabran-Grammont	Toulon	Kingdom of France	For French Navy.
Unknown date	Chaloupe Canonniere No. 5	Gunboat	Elzear de Sabran-Grammont	Toulon	Kingdom of France	For French Navy.
Unknown date	Chaloupe Canonniere No. 6	Gunboat	Elzear de Sabran-Grammont	Toulon	Kingdom of France	For French Navy.
Unknown date	Conquestador	Fourth rate			Spain	For Spanish Navy.
Unknown date	Constante	Third rate	David Howell	Guarnizo	Spain	For Spanish Navy.
Unknown date	Dankbaarheid	Sixth rate	Charles Bentham	Algiers	Regency of Algiers	For Dutch Navy.
Unknown date	Earl of Loudon	Sloop of war		Fort Niagara, New York	Thirteen Colonies	For Royal Navy.
Unknown date	George	Schooner		Oswego, New York	Thirteen Colonies	For Royal Navy.
Unknown date	Glorioso	Third rate	Reales Astilleros de Esteiro	Ferrol	Spain	For Spanish Navy.
Unknown date	Guerrero	Third rate	Guillermo Turner	Reales Astilleros de Esteiro, Ferrol	Spain	For Spanish Navy.
Unknown date	Louise	Schooner	Louis-Pierre Poulin de Cressé	Quebec City	New France	For French Navy.
Unknown date	Landskroon	Fourth rate	Charles Bentam	Amsterdam	Dutch Republic	For Dutch Navy.
Unknown date	Victor	Schooner	Louis-Pierre Poulin de Cressé	Quebec City	New France	For French Navy.
Unknown date	Marquis de Vaudreuil	Schooner		Fort Cataraqui	New France	For French Navy.
Unknown date	Ontario	Sloop of war		Oswego, New York	Thirteen Colonies	For Royal Navy.
Unknown date	Oswego	Sloop of war		Oswego, New York	Thirteen Colonies	For Royal Navy.
Unknown date	Schieland	Fourth rate	Charles Bentam	Amsterdam	Dutch Republic	For Dutch Navy.
Unknown date	Soberano	Third rate	Guillermo Turner	Reales Astilleros de Esteiro, Ferrol	Spain	For Spanish Navy.
Unknown date	Stormont	East Indiaman			Great Britain	For British East India Company.
Unknown date	Terrible	Terrible-class ship of the line	Edward Bryant	Arsenal de Cartagena	Spain	For Spanish Navy.
Unknown date	Valiant	Schooner		Oswego, New York	Thirteen Colonies	For Royal Navy.
Unknown date	Vencedor	Third rate	Reales Astilleros de Esteiro	Ferrol	Spain	For Spanish Navy.
Unknown date	Weststellingwerf	Sixth rate	Peter Edwards	Amsterdam	Dutch Republic	For Dutch Navy.
