= HMS Conquestador =

Two ships of the Royal Navy have borne the name HMS Conquestador, named after the Conquistadors, the term for Spanish troops involved in the conquest of the Americas:

- HMS Conquestador (1762) was a 60-gun fourth-rate ship of the line captured from the Spanish in 1762. She was placed on harbour service from 1775 and was broken up in 1782.
- HMS Conquestador (1810) was a 74-gun third-rate ship of the line launched in 1810. She was converted to a fourth rate in 1831, used as a powder hulk from 1860 and was sold in 1897.

== See also ==
- HMS Conquest
