= HMS Dunkirk (1754) =

Ship of the line of the Royal Navy

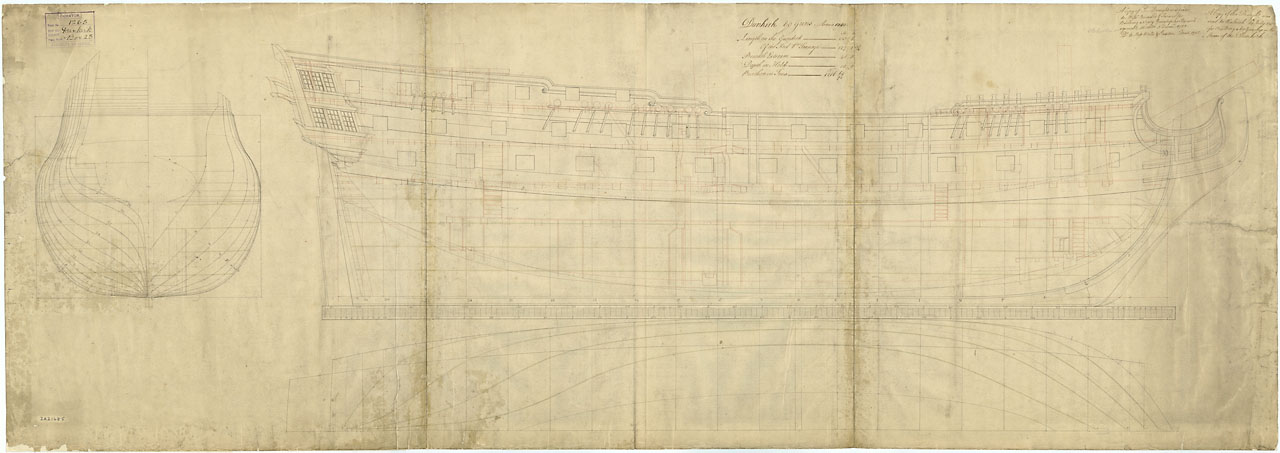
- Dunkirk

History

Great Britain
- Name: HMS Dunkirk
- Ordered: 12 July 1750
- Builder: Woolwich Dockyard
- Launched: 22 July 1754
- Fate: Sold, 1792

General characteristics
- Class & type: 1750 amendments 60-gun fourth-rate ship of the line
- Tons burthen: 1246
- Length: 153 ft 6 in (46.8 m) (gundeck)
- Beam: 42 ft 5 in (12.9 m)
- Depth of hold: 18 ft 6 in (5.6 m)
- Propulsion: Sails
- Sail plan: Full-rigged ship
- Armament: 60 guns: Gundeck: 24 × 24 pdrs; Upper gundeck: 26 × 12 pdrs; Quarterdeck: 8 × 6 pdrs; Forecastle: 2 × 6 pdrs

HMS Dunkirk was a 60-gun fourth-rate ship of the line of the Royal Navy, built by Edward Allin at Woolwich Dockyard to the draught specified by the 1745 Establishment as amended in 1750, and launched on 22 July 1754.

== Career ==
HMS Dunkirk was sent to America in 1755, along with several other ships, under Vice-Admiral Edward Boscawen. On 5 June she spotted four French ships which were bound for Canada under the command of Admiral Dubois de la Motte. Dunkirk, HMS Defiance and several other ships gave chase. Dunkirk came alongside the 64-gun Alcide and requested the captain meet with the vice admiral, who was then about three miles (4.8 km) away. After the captain of Alcide refused, Dunkirk opened fire. Soon afterwards, HMS Edgar came alongside the French at which Alcide struck her colours. Alcide had been carrying 900 troops and the governor of Louisbourg. The general of those troops was killed and 30,000 pounds sterling captured. In the battle the French vessel Lys was captured by HMS Fougueux.

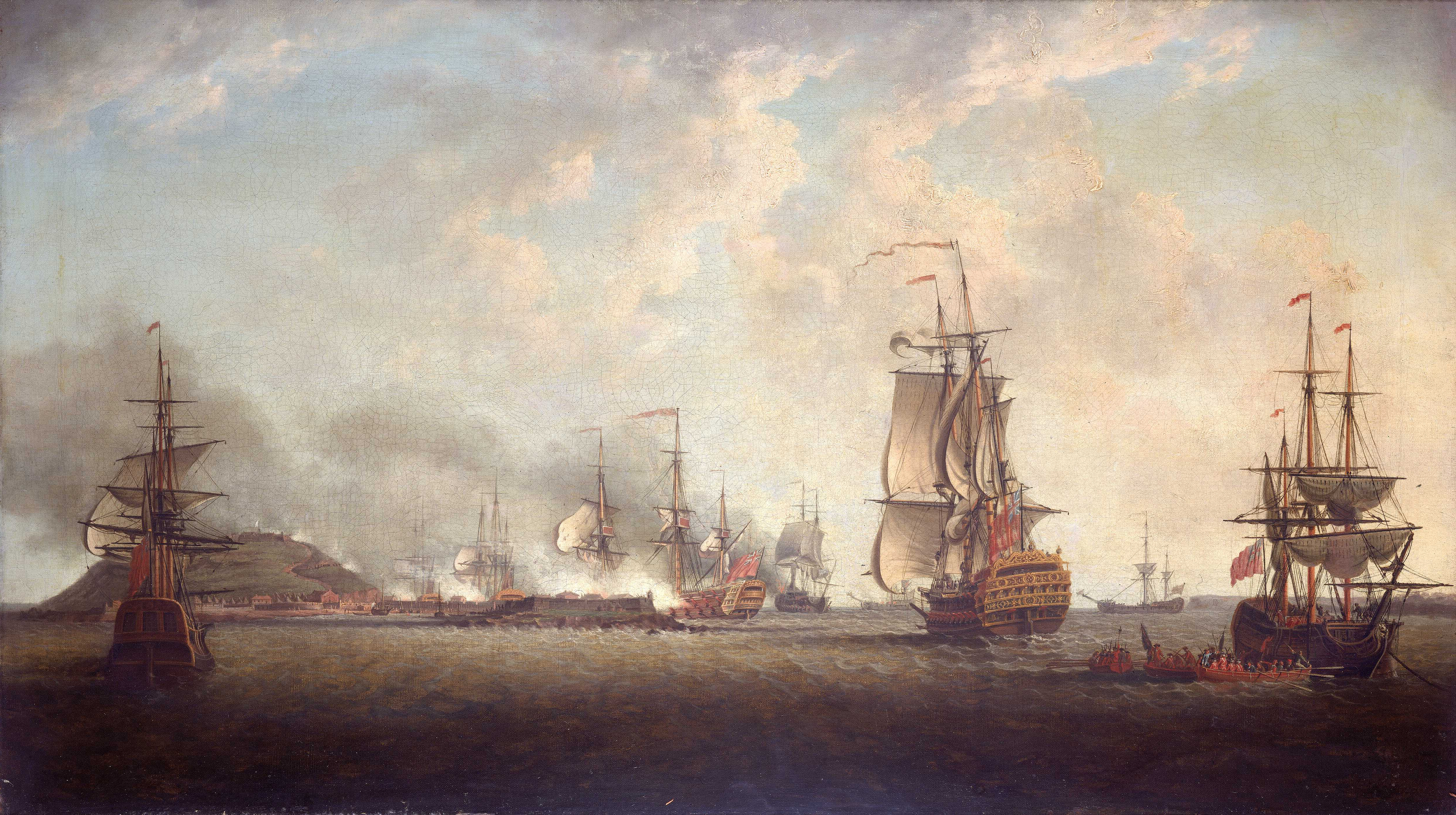
Attack on Gorée, 29 December 1758. Nassau and Dunkirk are on the far side of the fort's mole showing only their upper galleries and spars as they engage the fort's batteries on their port sides

In 1778, Dunkirk was placed on harbour service under captain John Milligan, who had previously served as second lieutenant aboard Eagle. During Milligan's captaincy, and despite her harbor service status, she was among the vessels credited with the capture on 23 December 1781 of the Dutch ship De Vrow Esther, being in company with Squirrel, Antigua, and Cambridge. Milligan left the ship in 1782, and Dunkirk was sold out of the navy in that same year.
