= Action of 8 June 1755 =

1755 battle of the French and Indian War

- Part of the French and Indian War
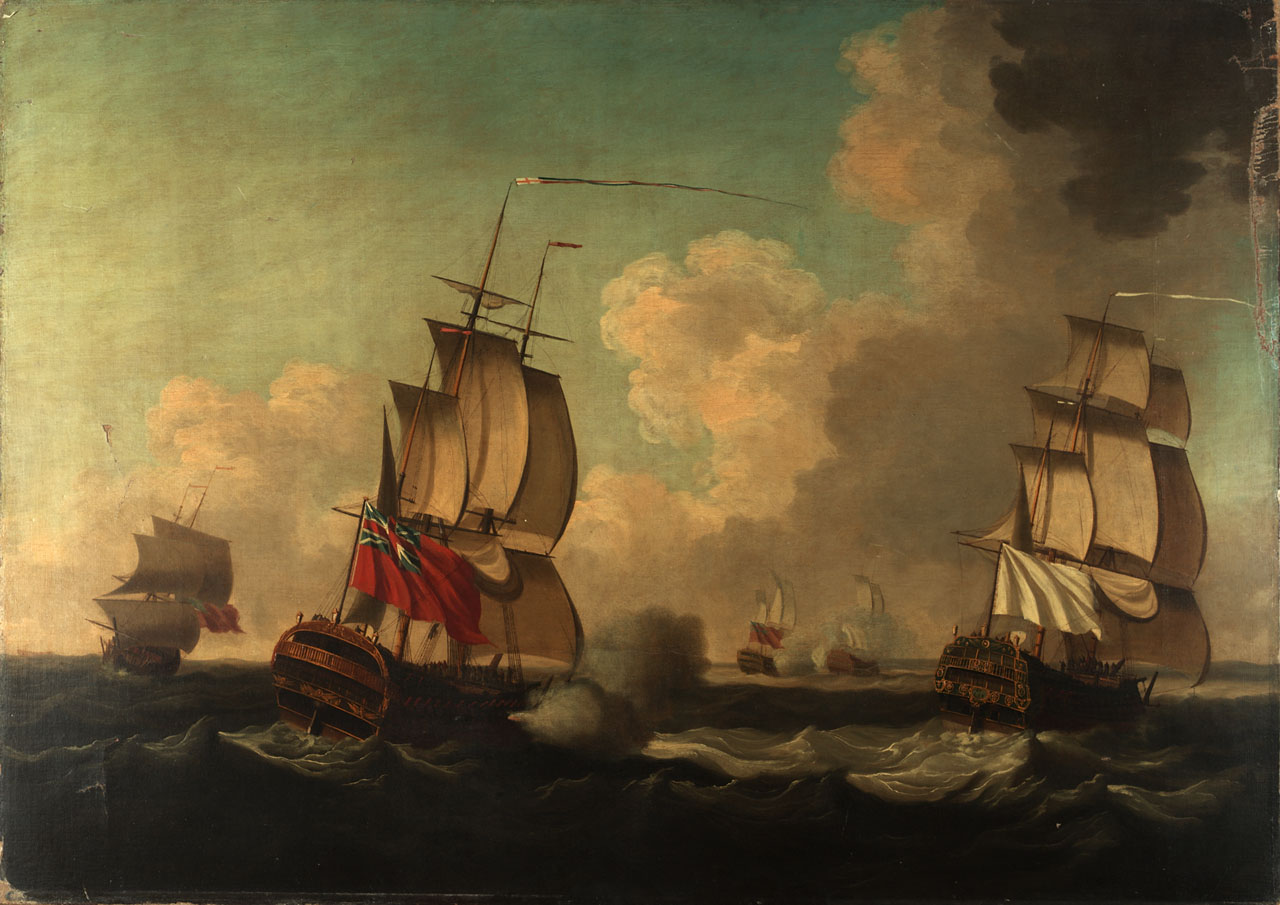
- The Capture of the 'Alcide' and 'Lys', 8 June 1755
Date	8 June 1755
Location	Off Cape Ray, Gulf of St. Lawrence
Result	British victory

Belligerents
Great Britain	France

Commanders and leaders
Edward Boscawen	Toussaint Hocquart

Strength
3 ships of the line	3 ships of the line

Casualties and losses
7 killed 25 wounded	130 killed or wounded 2,000 captured 2 ships of the line captured

The action of 8 June 1755 was a naval battle between France and Great Britain early in the French and Indian War. The British captured the third-rate French ships Alcide and Lys off Cape Ray, Newfoundland in the Gulf of St. Lawrence. The battle contributed to the eventual war declarations that in 1756 formally began the Seven Years' War.

== Background ==
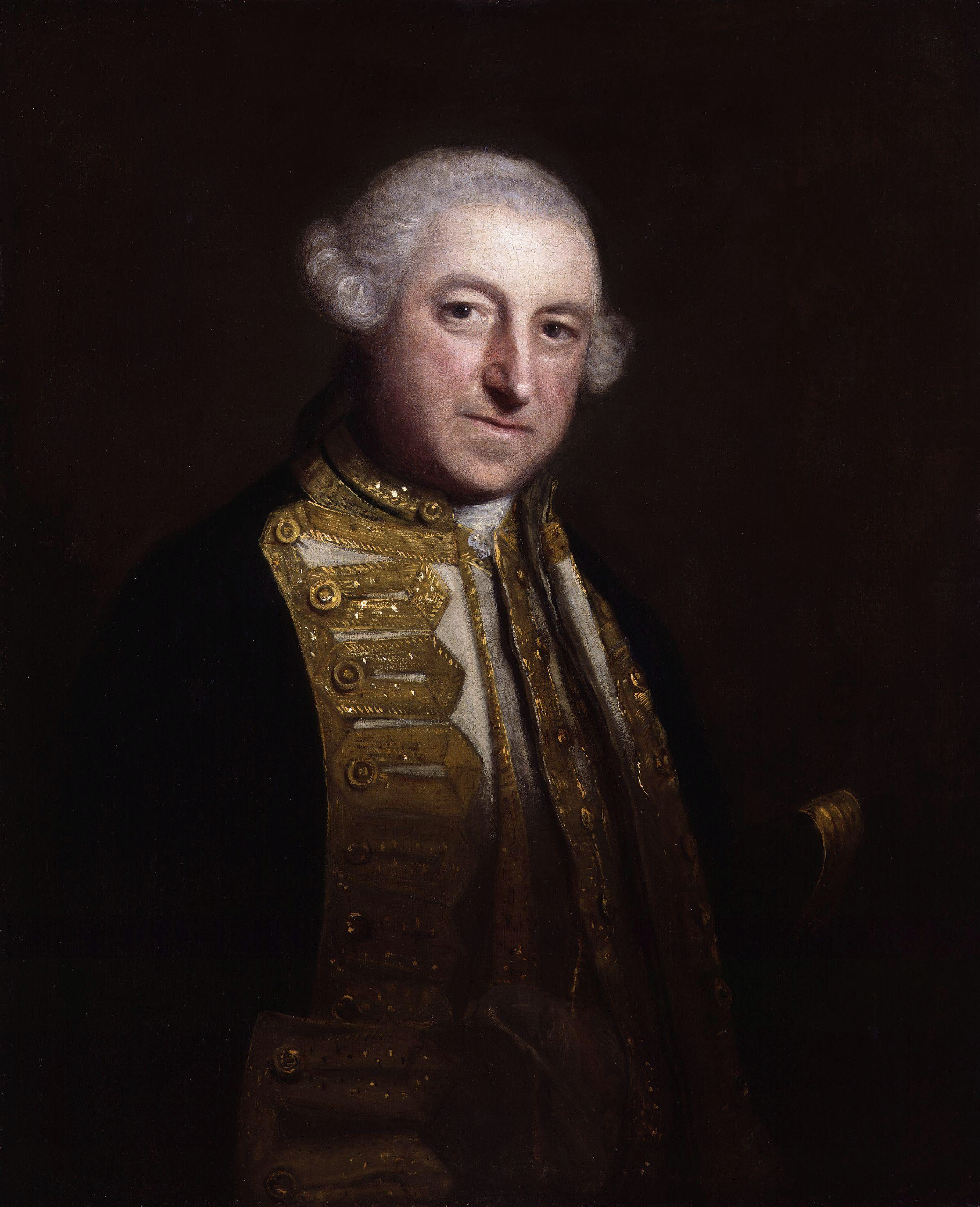
Vice Admiral Edward Boscawen was dispatched with eleven ships of the line to intercept French ships heading for Quebec City.

In 1754, French and British colonial forces clashed, first in the Battle of Jumonville Glen, and then in the Battle of Fort Necessity, over control of the upper Ohio River valley, near present-day Pittsburgh, Pennsylvania. When word of these conflicts reached London, government leaders decided to send regular army troops to occupy the site on which the French had constructed Fort Duquesne. Word of the British military planning leaked to France, where convoys of troops were also rushed into readiness for service in North America. The Royal Navy, aware of the French plans, dispatched Vice Admiral Edward Boscawen and a fleet of eleven ships of the line to the Gulf of St. Lawrence to intercept French shipping headed for Quebec City. Boscawen patrolled along the southern shore of Newfoundland. Three weeks later, a second fleet of seven ships was dispatched under Admiral Holbourne to intercept French shipping.

The French fleet, under the command of Admiral Dubois de la Motte, for the most part managed to avoid these British forces. Many of its ships landed at Louisbourg, and some successfully eluded Boscawen's fleet to reach Quebec. However, three ships became separated from the rest of the fleet in fog and encountered some of Boscawen's ships.

== Battle ==
HMS Dunkirk, HMS Defiance and HMS Torbay encountered the Dauphin Royal, Alcide, and Lys under the command of Toussaint Hocquart. Lys was sailing en flûte, and had been reduced to 22 cannons because she was carrying soldiers of the Régiment de la Reine and the Régiment de Languedoc; eight companies in all. Alcide had 64 guns and these ships soon fell in with the British ships. Hocquart of Alcide called out to the commander of Dunkirk Richard Howe, "Are we at war, or at peace?" to which Howe replied, "At peace, at peace." However, when the French were within pistol range of Dunkirk, Howe's squadron opened fire on the three French ships. Alcide being better armed than the other two French ships, returned fire and fought for five hours. However, after sustaining much damage she surrendered along with Lys. Dauphin Royal escaped in the fog.

== Aftermath ==
After this action and further harassment of French shipping by British naval forces, the two countries declared war on each other in the spring of 1756. The prisoners of this battle, most of them French land troops intended for service in New France, were held at Georges Island in Halifax Harbour and were treated as prisoners of war.

On board the ships Alcide and Lys were found to contain 10,000 scalping knives for Acadians and Indians under Mik Mak Chief Cope and Acadian Beausoleil as they continued to fight Father Le Loutre's War.

Hocquart became Boscawen's prisoner for the third time; he had been captured by him in a frigate action back in 1744. He was then captured again in the First Battle of Cape Finisterre (1747) before finally being captured in Alcide.

== Bibliography ==
- Picheon. French Perspective, p. 304
- The Naval Chronicle. Vol. 07. Bunney & Gold. 2007 [1799-1818]., pp. 200–202
- Barrow, John: The life of Richard, Earl Howe, K.G. : Admiral of the Fleet and General of Marine, London: 1838.
- Chartrand, Rene and Summers, Jack L. Military Uniforms in Canada, 1665–1970 (Ottawa: Canadian War Museum, 1981)
- Levot, Prosper Jean. Biographie bretonne: A-J-t.
