= Jeremiah Coghlan =

Royal Navy officer (1799–1844)

Captain Jeremiah Coghlan CB
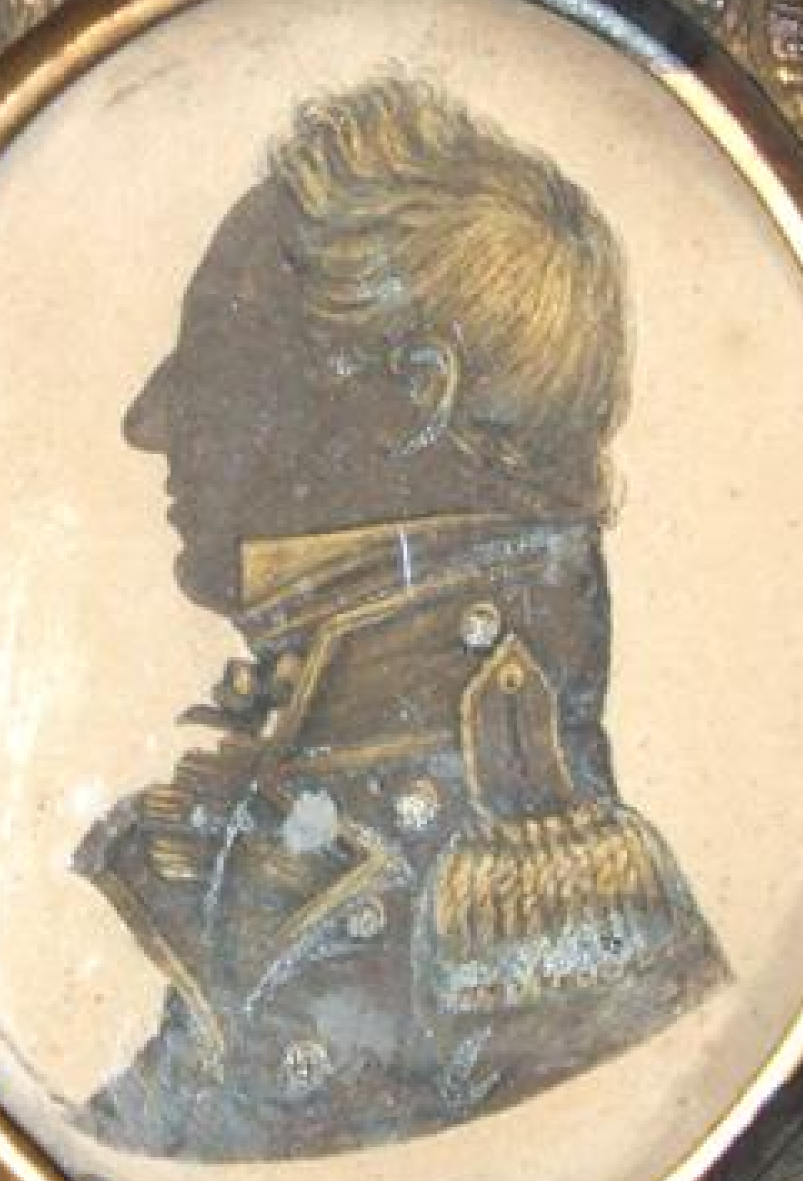
- Silhouette portrait of Coghlan
- Born: c. 1779; Crookhaven, County Cork
- Died: 4 March 1844; England
- Burial place: St Thomas Church, Ryde
- Relatives: General Sir William Marcus Coghlan (son); Susan Pellew Coghlan (daughter)
- Military career
- Allegiance: Great Britain; United Kingdom
- Branch: Royal Navy
- Service years: 1799–1844
- Rank: Captain
- Nickname: Intrepid Jerry
- Units: HMS Indefatigable; HMS Impetueux
- Commands: HMS Viper; HMS Nimble; HMS Renard; HMS Elk; HMS Euryalus; HMS Caledonia; HMS Alcmene; HMS Forte
- Wars: French Revolutionary Wars; Napoleonic Wars; Action of 5 November 1813
- Awards: Companion of the Order of The Bath; Freeman of the City of Cork

Captain Jeremiah Coghlan, CB (c. 1779 – 4 March 1844) was a Royal Navy officer who served in the French Revolutionary and Napoleonic Wars. (Note: Not to be confused with merchant and shipowner Jeremiah Coghlan 1756-88.) Despite his relatively humble background, he managed to rise from ship's boy to the rank of captain at the age of 34. This he achieved through notable acts of extraordinary courage and a succession of sea-fights which made him a celebrated hero, almost without equal, and he would later dine with both Nelson and Napoleon. Coghlan's career was initiated by his patron and close friend Sir Edward Pellew, after Pellew witnessed his heroic efforts during the rescue of the survivors of the East Indiaman Dutton.

Coghlan's exploits have been described as similar to plots for a collection of Hornblower novels Coghlan has also been compared to Hornblower because they were both protégés of Sir Edward Pellew aboard HMS Indefatigable. From May 1804 he served in the West Indies, returning as Sir Edward Pellew's flag captain on HMS Caledonia eight years later. Coghlan also holds the distinction of being the only person in the Royal Navy to have been promoted to Lieutenant after only four years service.

== Early years ==
Jeremiah Coghlan was born c. 1779 in Crookhaven, County Cork; his brother Daniel was later the agent for Lloyds. He ran away to sea as a cabin boy, because, he later claimed, his mother had mistreated him.

In one incident his ship became stranded on the rocks in a storm near Mevagissey. Captain Smith (at home ashore) saw the stricken vessel and commandeered a fishing boat. He managed to rescue the master and the crew but whilst they were on their way back to safety they realised that the cabin boy was still missing. Captain Smith insisted on returning to search for him and they found him clinging with terror to the fore-topmast. The captain climbed the mast and managed to save the boy, who was the young Jerry Coghlan.

== Dutton ==
1821 painting of Dutton wrecking at Plymouth Sound by Thomas Luny

On 26 January 1796 the Dutton, which was transporting troops to the West Indies, ran aground under the citadel in Plymouth with almost 500 men, women and children still on board. A crowd gathered and watched helpless as the ship lay stricken. Due to the raging storm no boats dared to venture out, but this did not deter Coghlan, aged just 16, from plunging into the raging sea with a rope tied around his body. Although at great risk of being dashed to pieces on the rocks, he was successful in saving several lives. When he was unable to continue swimming, he found a boat and volunteers to man it, and proceeded to save a total of about 50 people.

In the meantime Captain Edward Pellew had managed to board the vessel and was restoring order amongst the chaos. Spurred on by this spectacle of bravery, Coghlan, along with Mr. Edsell (signal midshipman to the port admiral), managed to obtain a boat from the Barbican, row out to Dutton, and bring their boat alongside her. It was Coghlan who managed to secure the Dutton's lifeline. This enabled hawsers to be rigged with cradles for hauling people ashore one by one. In the end only 15 lives were lost.

"Soon after Sir Edward reached the wreck, a small boat belonging to an Irish brig came to alongside, with two persons who greatly assisted him in this work of benevolence. One of these young men was the mate, whom Captain Pellew on the following day received into his own ship, and thenceforward became his steady friend and patron. It is almost unnecessary to add, that this officer is now Captain Coghlan, R.N."

== Early career ==
=== HMS Indefatigable and HMS Impetueux ===
After spending three years on a merchant ship, Coghlan was persuaded to join Sir Edward Pellew on HMS Indefatigable as a midshipman. This "added to the British Navy an officer almost unrivaled in heroic exploits - no less a character than Captain Jeremiah Coghlan". In the spring of 1799 he moved with Edward Pellew to HMS Impetueux. While on these ships he distinguished himself on numerous occasions with his gallantry on boat services and he also saved the lives of several of their crew members who had accidentally fallen overboard. As a reward for this gallantry Pellew persuaded Admiral Lord St Vincent to give him command of the cutter Viper as acting lieutenant.

== Notable actions ==
=== Cutting out Cerbère ===
"I Did not think the Enterprize of Sir Edward Hamilton or of Captain Campbell could have been rivalled until I read the enclosed Letter from Sir Edward Pellew, relating the desperate Service performed by acting Lieutenant Coghlan, of the Viper Cutter..., which has filled me with pride and admiration"

— Earl St Vincent, London Gazette, Letter to Evan Nepean.

On 29 July 1800, acting Lieutenant Jeremiah Coghlan was in command of the 14-gun cutter Viper, attached to Sir Edward Pellew's squadron, when he led a famous cutting out (Note: To "cut out" is to capture and carry off an enemy vessel while she is at anchor or in a harbour.) expedition, during a blockade of Port Louis, on the South Coast of Brittany.

He persuaded Edward Pellew to lend him a 10-oared cutter and 12 volunteers from Impetueux and with boats also from HMS Amethyst and Viper, the Irish fire-eater planned to launch a night raid on some of the gun-boats and vessels which were guarding the entrance to the harbour. Coghlan took six of his own men and Midshipman Silas Paddon from Viper, which made 20 men in total. Striking out ahead Coghlan's boat reached the French gun-brig Cerbère alone and without the support of the other two boats. Heavily outnumbered, they were twice beaten back by the 87 men on board, but on the third attempt they managed to triumph, boarding Cerbère and killing every officer on board. Then, with the help of the other two boats, they managed to tow Cerbère out under heavy fire from the shore batteries. Although the expedition was a great success, Coghlan himself was badly wounded; after being caught up in a trawl-net, he had a pike driven through his thigh. Mr Paddon was also wounded in six places.

For this action Earl St Vincent presented the youthful Irishman with a sword (Note: Picture in Antiques & Fine Art Magazine.) of 100 guineas value. He was promoted to lieutenant, which required a special order from the King in Council, as he had only been in the Navy four and a half years. Furthermore, the squadron let the boat crews keep the prize money for themselves, in recognition of their gallantry.

Captain Coghlan did not survive to claim the Naval General Service Medal with clasp "29 July Boat Service 1800" awarded in 1847.

=== General Ernouf ===
On Friday 20 March 1805, Coghlan was in command of HMS Renard and her complement of 90 men, off the north coast of San Domingo. He gave chase to a French privateer. The quarry was General Ernouf, from Guadeloupe, commanded by Paul Gerard Pointe, with a complement of 160 men, 31 of whom were soldiers. After a chase of about three hours Renard managed to close in on the Frenchman who immediately opened fire. Legend has it that Monsieur Pointe, on seeing the inferior size of Renard, called for her to strike, and Captain Coghlan took up his trumpet and replied "Aye! I'll strike, and damned hard too, my lad, directly". Coghlan waited until the French were within pistol-shot and then commenced a disciplined and deadly accurate return of fire. After 35 minutes General Ernouf was seen to catch fire and ten minutes later she blew up with a dreadful explosion.

"...every possible Exertion was now made to get the only Boat that could swim to the Relief of the few Brave, but unfortunate Survivors.... who were now seen all around us, on the scattered remnants of the Wreck, in a mangled and truly distressing state."

— Jeremiah Coghlan, London Gazette, Letter to Dacres

=== Capture of Diligent ===
On 25 May 1806, in the afternoon, Renard was about 10 miles north-north-east of the island of Mona when Coghlan spotted a foreign ship near the island of Zacheo off Puerto Rico. A long chase followed that lasted well through the night and into the next day.

On 26 May, while the chase continued throughout the day, it was discovered to be the French navy brig Diligent, of fourteen 6-pounder and two 32-pounder guns. On the 27th, although Renard was now gaining on the enemy, the weather was becalmed and so yet another day and night passed. By noon on the 28th Renard had finally got almost near enough to open fire, when Diligent's commander, lieutenant de vaisseau Thévenard, suddenly surrendered his ship without a shot being fired by either side.

When taken on board Renard, M. Thévenard was surprised by the smallness of the vessel and requested that he might be returned to his ship to continue the fight. Coghlan naturally laughed at this request. The Frenchman then very seriously asked that Coghlan might award him a certificate stating that he had not acted cowardly. The Captain replied "No, I cannot do that; but I will give you one that shall specify you have acted 'prudently'!"

=== Storming the guns at Cassis ===
In August 1813 Captain Thomas Ussher on HMS Undaunted discovered a number of vessels lying in the mole at Cassis, in the south of France. Five heavy gun batteries, one of which was protected by a wall 25 feet high, overlooked the town and harbour. Coghlan led a detachment of 200 marines and managed to overcome the citadel battery by escalade, under heavy fire. A certain Lieutenant Hunt distinguished himself by being the first over the top.

This battery in possession, the British drove the French at the point of the bayonet and pursued them through the defences to the heights that commanded the town, leaving it entirely at the mercy of the British ships. This enabled HMS Redwing under Captain Sir John Sinclair to enter the mole and capture three gun boats and 24 merchant settees and tartans.

The success of the venture was in large part owed to the gallantry of Coghlan and the marines under his command, as was later highlighted in Ussher's letter to Sir Edward Pellew.

=== Seizing Naples ===
In early May 1815, Coghlan was captain of HMS Alcmene as second in command of a British squadron headed by Captain Robert Campbell of HMS Tremendous on its way to the bay of Naples during the Neapolitan War. Joachim Murat, the King of Naples was about to be deposed after his defeat by the Austrians at Tolentino. The British squadron managed to prevent two Neapolitan ships of the line, Joachim and Capri, escaping to France. On board were Napoleon's mother, his brother Jérôme, his sister Pauline and Murat's children together "with all the crown jewels, much public treasure, the pictures and other costly moveables of the palace. The whole of this valuable property, upon its arrival at Toulon would of course have been at the disposal of Buonaparte". It was all returned to the Sicilian Court.

On 11 May 1815, the squadron, consisting of Tremendous, Alcmene, HMS Partridge and HMS Grasshopper arrived off Naples and blockaded the port. Under the authority of Captain Campbell and after threatening to bombard the city, Coghlan helped to negotiate the treaty, signed on 13 May 1815, which enabled them to gain possession of all the ships and the naval arsenal in the Port of Naples - including Joachim and Capri. This would later lead to a grant from Parliament of £150,000, as prize money to be shared amongst the officers and crew members. (Note: Coghlan's share of the prize money would have been approximately £5800.)

Edward Pellew, Viscount Exmouth, as overall commander, arrived in Naples on the 20th. Although it had been agreed that the Austrians would take over on 23 May, Murat fled the city in disguise on the 19th and so Exmouth despatched Coghlan and 500 marines to restore order in the city. They quelled the rioters at the point of the bayonet and took over all the forts in the city. Coghlan installed himself in the Castle of St Elmo, and united with the civic guard to keep order until the arrival of Prince Leopold on the 23rd.

== Late career ==
On 4 June 1815 he was nominated a CB. From 1826 to 1830, he commanded the frigate, HMS Forte on the South America Station. He died at Ryde on 4 March 1844 aged 69.

== Family ==
He married a daughter of Charles Hay of Jamaica, widow of Captain John Marshall, R.N. His son was General Sir William Marcus Coghlan.

== Footnotes ==
Notes

Citations
