= HMS Amethyst (1799) =

Frigate of the Royal Navy

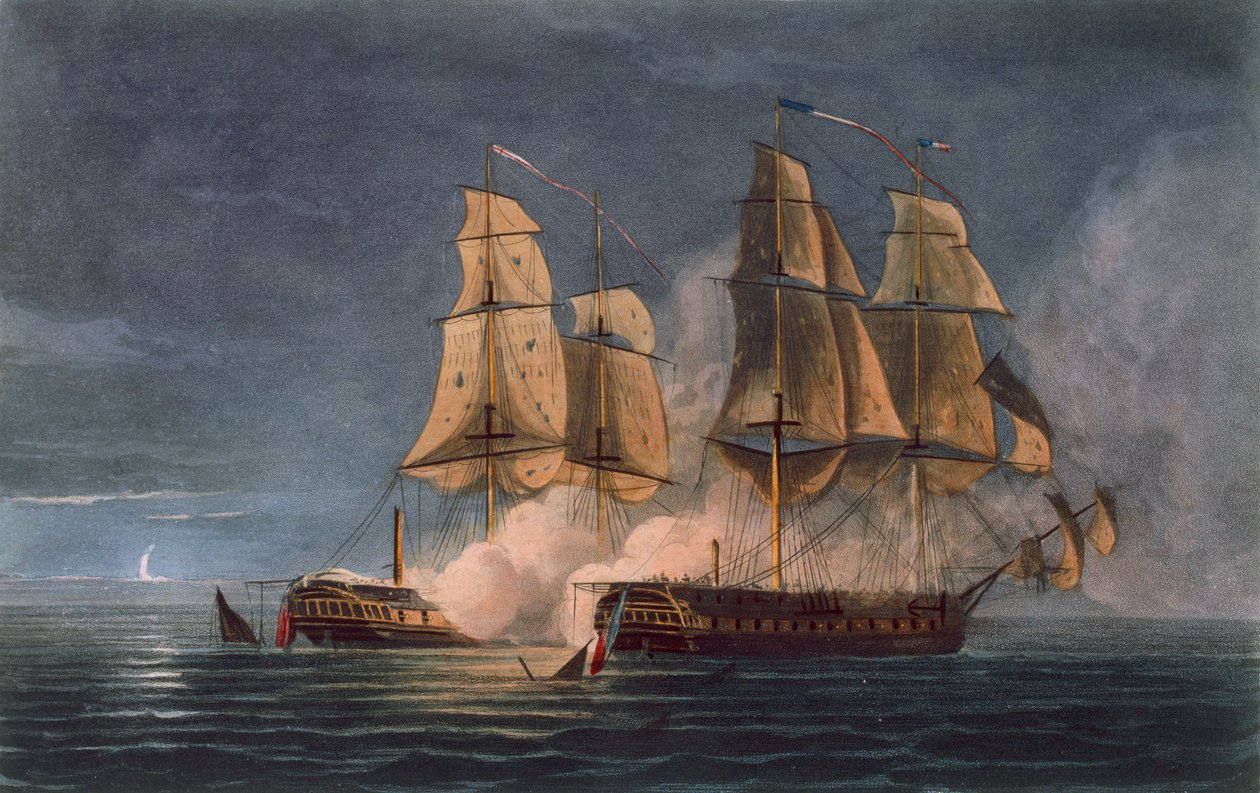
- Capture of the Thétis by HMS Amethyst on 10 November 1808, by Thomas Whitcombe

History

Great Britain
- Name: HMS Amethyst
- Builder: Deptford Dockyard
- Launched: 24 April 1799
- Commissioned: May 1799
- Honours and awards: Clasps to the Naval General Service Medal; "29 July Boat Service 1800"; "29 Aug. Boat Service 1800"; "Amethyst Wh. Thetis"; "Amethyst 5 April 1809"
- Fate: Wrecked on 16 February 1811; Wreck broken up in April 1811

General characteristics
- Class & type: Penelope-class frigate
- Tons burthen: 104548/94 (bm)
- Length: 150 ft (45.7 m) (overall); 125 ft 5 3/8 in (38.2 m) (keel)
- Beam: 39 ft 7 in (12.1 m)
- Depth of hold: 13 ft 0 in (4.0 m)
- Sail plan: Full-rigged ship
- Complement: 274
- Armament: Upper Deck:26 × 18-pounder guns; QD:2 × 9-pounder guns + 10 × 32-pounder carronades; Fc:2 × 9-pounder guns + 2 × 32-pounder carronades

HMS Amethyst was a Royal Navy 36-gun Penelope-class fifth-rate frigate, launched in 1799 at Deptford. Amethyst served in the French Revolutionary Wars and the Napoleonic Wars, capturing several prizes. She also participated in two boat actions and two ship actions that won her crew clasps to the Naval General Service Medal. She was broken up in 1811 after suffering severe damage in a storm.

== French Revolutionary Wars ==
Amethyst was commissioned in May 1799 under the command of Captain John Cooke. She then operated on the Dutch coast later that year. During the Anglo-Russian invasion of Holland, Amethyst conveyed the Duke of York to the Netherlands and later participated in the evacuation of the force following the campaign's collapse.

On 18 December she and Beaulieu recaptured the brig Jenny. Eleven days after that, Amethyst and Beaulieu recaptured the ships Dauphin, Cato, Cabrus, and Nymphe.

On 29 December Amethyst captured the French privateer brig Aventurier (or Avanture). Aventurier, out of Lorient, was armed with 14 guns and had a crew of 75 men. One month earlier, on 29 November, Aventurier had captured the American ship Cato and taken her master, John Parker, and his crew prisoner. When Amethyst captured Aventurier Cooke freed the Americans and informed Parker that Cato had been sent to Cork. Cooke sent Aventurier into Plymouth from where Parker and his mate traveled to Cork. Aventurier was sold at Plymouth in April 1800 and became the British privateer Earl Spencer

On 7 January 1800, the French armed ship Huzelle (or Ursule), came into Plymouth. She had been carrying passengers from Cayenne, including women and children, when Amethyst captured her. On her way into a British port, the French privateer Providence, of 14 guns and 152 men, had recaptured her and sent her to Bordeaux. However, before she got there, Beaulieu and Unicorn again captured her and sent her into Plymouth. Huzelle was low on provision with the result that a five-year-old child died while she was in Plymouth Sound; as she anchored at Catwater, M.P. Symonds, the broker for the prize, delivered fresh provisions to Huzelle. Among Huzelle's passengers were a Colonel Molonson of Invalids, and a naturalist, M. Burnelle, with a cabinet of curiosities for the French National Museum at Paris.

Later that month, on the 26th, Oiseaux encountered the French frigate Dédaigneuse and gave chase. Sirius and Amethyst joined the next day. On the 28th Oiseaux and Sirius effected the capture. Unfavourable winds kept Amethyst from joining the action. She was brought into Royal Navy service as HMS Dedaigneuse.

In February 1800 Amethyst was in company with Nymphe when on 15 February they captured the French privateer cutter Valiant (or Vaillante), of Bordeaux, after a long chase. Valiant was armed with one long 18-pounder, two long 12-pounder, and twelve 6-pounders guns. She had a crew of 131 men who had been out four days, but had not yet captured anything. (Note: Vaillant wasoffered for sale at Plymouth on 9 April 1800. She was described as having a burthen of 20017/94, length 78 ft 6 1/4 in (23.9 m), breadth 25 ft 3 1/4 in (7.7 m), and hold depth 11 ft 2 1/4 in (3.4 m). She was pierced for 16 guns.)

On 24 February, Nymphe, in company with Amethyst, captured the French letter of marque Modeste, of about 600 tons burthen. She was pierced for 16 guns and had a crew of 70 men. She had left the Île de France some nine weeks earlier and was sailing for Bordeaux with a cargo of cotton, coffee, tea, sugar, indigo, and the like. Still in company with Nymphe, Amethyst captured Julius Pringle and recaptured Active (4 March) and Amity (21 March). The French privateer Mars had taken Active, Clark, master, on 17 February. Active had been sailing from Chepstow to Portsmouth, and after her recapture came into Bearhaven.

Then on 31 March, Amethyst, with Nymphe, captured Mars. Mars was armed with twenty 12-pounder guns and two 36-pounder obusiers, and carried a crew of 180 men. Cooke described her as being "one of the finest Privateers fitted out of Bourdeaux." The British took Mars into service as Garland.

Amethyst also captured a valuable American ship attempting to dock in a French port. This may have been Caroline, captured on 14 April.

In early June Cooke met up with Captain Sir Edward Pellew's squadron at Quiberon Bay. The squadron engaged in a successful large scale raid on Morbihan, though Amethyst's role, if any, is unclear.

Amethyst was among the vessels of a squadron that shared the proceeds for the recapture on 28 June 1800 of Lancaster. She was also part of Pellew's squadron, which shared in the proceeds of the capture of Vigilant, Menais, Insolent, Ann, and the wreck of a vessel that was sold, and the recapture of Industry.

On 29 July, a boat each from Viper, Impetueux and Amethyst, all manned by volunteers under the command of Lieutenant Jeremiah Coghlan of Viper, cut out the French naval brig Cerbère, armed with three 24-pounder and four 6-pounder guns. Cerbère was manned by 87 men under the command of lieutenant de vaisseau Menage and was moored in a port within pistol-shot of three batteries and near a number of naval vessels. The attack was a success, with the British boarding party of some 20 men losing only one man killed and eight wounded, including Coghlan; none of the casualties were from Amethyst's boat, which did not take part in the actual boarding. The French lost six men killed and 20 wounded. In admiration for the feat, Pellew's squadron gave up their share of the prize money, with the result that it accrued in its entirety to the cutting-out party. In 1847 the Admiralty awarded the Naval General Service Medal with clasp "29 July Boat Service 1800" to the four surviving claimants from the action.

Next, Amethyst participated in an abortive invasion of Ferrol. On 29 August, in Vigo Bay, Admiral Sir Samuel Hood assembled a cutting-out party from the vessels under his command consisting of two boats each from Amethyst, Stag, Amelia, Brilliant, and Cynthia, four boats from Courageaux, as well as the boats from Renown, London, and Impetueux. The party went in and after a 15-minute fight captured the French privateer Guêpe, of Bordeaux, and towed her out. She was of 300 tons burthen and had a flush deck. Pierced for 20 guns, she carried eighteen 9-pounders, and she and her crew of 161 men were under the command of Citizen Dupan. In the attack she lost 25 men killed, including Dupan, and 40 wounded. British casualties amounted to four killed, 23 wounded and one missing. (Note: A first-class share of the prize money was worth £42 19s 6½d; a fifth-class share, that of a seaman, was worth 1s 9½d.) In 1847 the Admiralty awarded the Naval General Service Medal with clasp "29 Aug. Boat Service 1800" to all surviving claimants from the action.

On 9 October, Amethyst returned to Plymouth from a secret mission. She and Nymphe would share in the prize money for a captured a French East Indiaman. During their stay in port the prize netted them £36,000.

In 1801, Amethyst operated off Spain, capturing two Spanish privateers and the French corvette Général Brune. On 26 January, Oiseaux encountered Dédaigneuse and gave chase while unfavorable winds kept Amethyst from joining the action. The British brought Dédaigneuse into Royal Navy service as HMS Dedaigneuse.

Later on 28 January Sirius and Amethyst captured the Spanish Letter of Marque Charlotta (or Carlotta) of Ferol, 16 hours out of Ferol on her way to Curaçao. The capture took place about six or seven leagues from Cape Belem in Galicia. The hired armed cutter Earl St Vincent shared in the capture.

The next day Atalante captured the Spanish privateer Intrepido Cid. Amethyst and Sirius shared in the prize money by agreement.

On 16 March, Amethyst encountered and captured Nostra Signora del Carmen, a Spanish privateer schooner. Nostra Signora was armed with six guns and had a crew of 65 men. She had left Rigo [sic] the previous evening and had not captured anything. Cooke decided to destroy her as she appeared unfit to take into the navy.

On 12 April, Amethyst captured French navy corvette General Brune. General Brune was a former merchant ship and she was sailing from Guadeloupe to Bordeaux. She was under the command of Citizen Martin, lieutenant de vaisseaux. She was armed with fourteen 6-pounders guns and had 108 men on board, including Général Péalardy, the late governor of Guadaloupe, and his suite.

On 10 September Amethyst captured the French lugger Alert, and recaptured a ship.

In October 1801 Captain Charles Taylor took command of Amethyst, only to be replaced in the next month by Captain Henry Glynn, for the North Sea. During the Peace of Amiens, Amethyst sailed on anti-smuggling patrols off the coast of Scotland under the command of Captain Alexander Campbell.

On 30 July 1802, Amethyst and the frigates, Glenmore and Galatea, sailed from Plymouth for the Isle of Wight. There they were to pick up Dutch troops that they were to return to Holland.

During the autumn and winter of 1802–03 Amethyst was sent to the Northern Station, based at Leith. On Wednesday 27 October 1802, 38 miles off Tod Head, she captured Vlugheid, smuggling cutter from Flushing. Aboard were John Dangerfield and eleven other seamen. (Note: The eleven others were Peter Francis, Daniel Slaughter, Daniel Taylor, John Lads, William Holloday, James Law, Henry Andrews, Richard Cullen, George Smith, John Boxer, William Knock and John Kenny, all from Folkestone.) On 18 November 1802, three or four leagues from the Isle of May, Campbell captured Fly, a smuggling lugger from Flushing, "laden with 570 Ankers of Gineva and eighty five Bails of Tobacco". On Tuesday 30 November Amethyst gave chase to three more smuggling luggers, but lost them due to lack of wind.

Captain Campbell wrote to the Admiralty on 27 October 1802 requesting that he might keep the seamen captured on Vlugheid, because Amethyst was 29 short of complement. However, Dangerfield and the others were released on 22 November.

In a letter to the Admiralty dated 10 November Capt. Campbell reported that the smugglers were attempting to bribe the seamen to desert from His Majesty’s ships on the Leith station "so as to disable them from cruising". In a letter dated 27 October 1802, at sea, he had complained that "The Revenue Cruizers belonging to Leith are seldom out of Harbour. I have not seen or heard of any of them during my cruise altho' there are several smuggling vessels on the coast".

== Napoleonic Wars ==
In the months before the resumption of war with France, the Navy started preparations that included impressing seamen. The crews of outbound Indiamen were an attractive target. Woodford and Ganges were sitting in the Thames in March 1803, taking their crews on board just prior to sailing. At sunset, a press gang from HMS Immortalite rowed up to Woodford, while boats from Amethyst and HMS Lynx approached Ganges. As the press gangs approached they were noticed, and the crews of both Indiamen were piped to quarters. That is, they assembled on the decks armed with pikes and cutlasses, and anything they could throw. The officers in charge of the press gangs thought this mere bravado and pulled alongside the Indiamen, only to meet a severe resistance from the crewmen, who had absolutely no desire to serve in the Royal Navy. The men from Immortalite suffered several injuries from shot and pike that were thrown at them, and eventually the marines opened fire with muskets, killing two sailors on Woodford. Even so, the press gangs were not able to get on board either Indiaman, and eventually withdrew some distance. When Woodford's officers finally permitted the press gang from Immortalite to board, all they found on board were a few sickly sailors.

Some seven months later, on 11 November 1803 Amethyst captured Spes, H. L. Cornelia, master. Three days later, Amethyst captured Johannes. That same day Amethyst captured Irene, L. J. Lubbens, master.

In June 1804, a court martial dismissed Campbell from command of Amethyst and stripped him of all his seniority on the Captain's List for misconduct in an action with four Dutch vessels off the coast of Norway. Command transferred to Captain John Spranger.

On 24 July Amethyst, while in company with Magicienne, captured Agnela. On 30 July Amethyst captured the Ebenezer, and then on 1 August Amethyst captured Juno. In December Amethyst participated in the pursuit of a French squadron under Admiral Willaumez.

In November 1805 Amethyst encountered the brig-sloop Wolverine off the coast of Madeira. After a series of ambiguous and misinterpreted moves by the other, the two captains mistook each other for enemies and opened fire. Both vessels survived and the two captains proceeded to exchange mutually recriminatory letters.

Amethyst was among the vessels that shared in the proceeds of the capture, on 25 July 1805, of the Jonge Jacob. (Note: The share of a petty officer was 6s 8d, and the share of a seaman was 6½d.)

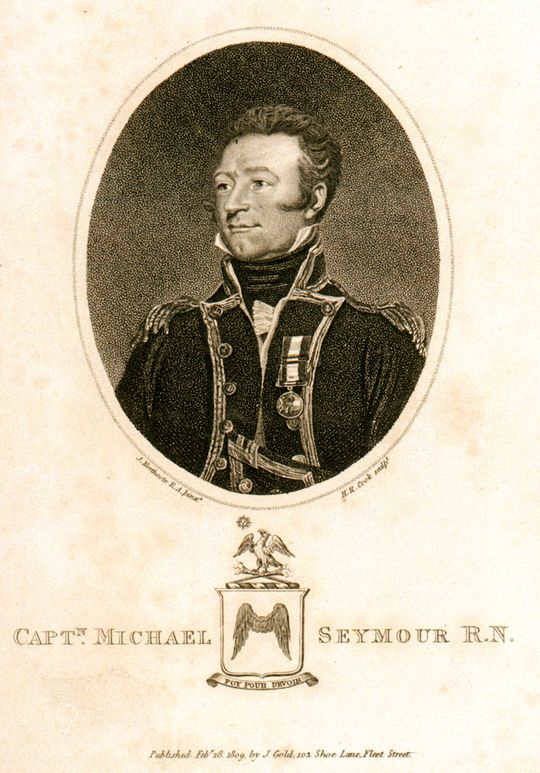
Sir Michael Seymour, Ist Baronet

Captain Michael Seymour replaced Spranger. On 15 May 1807, Amethyst captured the privateer Josephine some 20 leagues from Scilly. Josephine was armed with four 2-pounders guns and small arms. She had a crew of 45 men, but had put ten on board Jane, which had been sailing from Lisbon. Josephine had sailed from the Île de Batz and Jane was her only capture. When Amethyst captured Josephine, Amethyst was in company with Dryad and Plover.

Then on 9 September Amethyst captured the Danish ship Twende Venner. (Note: The share of a petty officer was £1 8s 7¼d, and the share of a seaman was 6s 8¼d.)

Later, on 18 October, Amethyst recaptured the ship Susannah. Amethyst also recaptured the American brig Rising Sun.

On 10 March 1808 Amethyst captured the Spanish brig Vigilantie. Eleven days later Amethyst recaptured the Portuguese schooner Inseperavil Unio. (Note: A petty officer's share of the prize money for both was £41 19s 1¼d; a seaman's share was £9 8s 9½d.)

On 3 May Amethyst and Conflict captured the French sloop Actif. Sixteen days later, Amethyst, Conflict, and Growler were in company when they captured the French schooner Annais. The next month, on 10 June, Amethyst and Conflict captured the Spanish schooner Carmelita. (Note: The share of a petty officer was 7s 2¼d, and the share of a seaman was 1s 5½d.) Fourteen days later, Amethyst captured the American brig Sally Tracey. Then Amethyst was again in company with Growler when they captured St. Etienne, Maria Julia, and six chasse marees on 9 July. Lastly, on 17 September Amethyst captured sundry spars.

In November 1808 Amethyst captured the French frigate Thétis at the action of 10 November 1808. British casualties in the engagement were severe, with 19 killed and 51 wounded, but French losses were several times larger, with 135 dead and 102 wounded. Amethyst had been severely damaged in the engagement and repairs took 71 days to complete at Plymouth. Seymour's victory was rewarded: Seymour himself was presented with a commemorative medal, £100 (with £625 to share among the wounded) and the freedoms of Cork and Limerick. The Admiralty awarded him a gold medal; this was one of only 18 actions that it so honoured. In addition, first lieutenant Goddard Blennerhasset was promoted to commander, the junior officers were advanced, and the Royal Navy purchased Thétis, commissioning her as HMS Brune. In 1847 the Admiralty authorized the issue of the Naval General Service Medal with clasp "Amethyst Wh. Thetis" to the still living survivors of the battle.

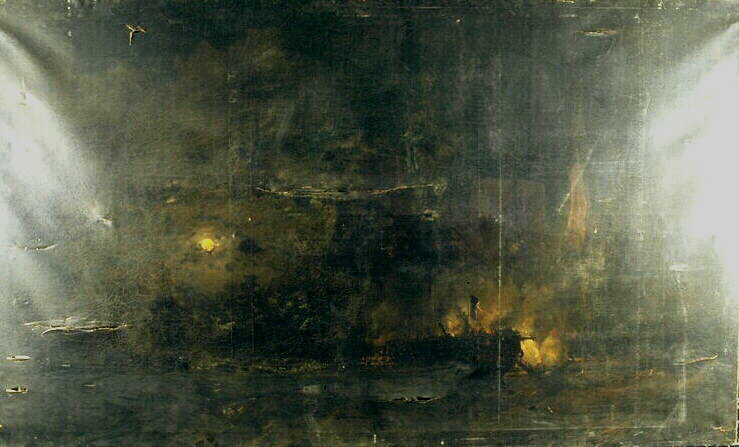
Combat de la frégate Niemen contre les frégates Aréthusa et Amethyst, by Jean-Baptiste Henri Durand-Brager

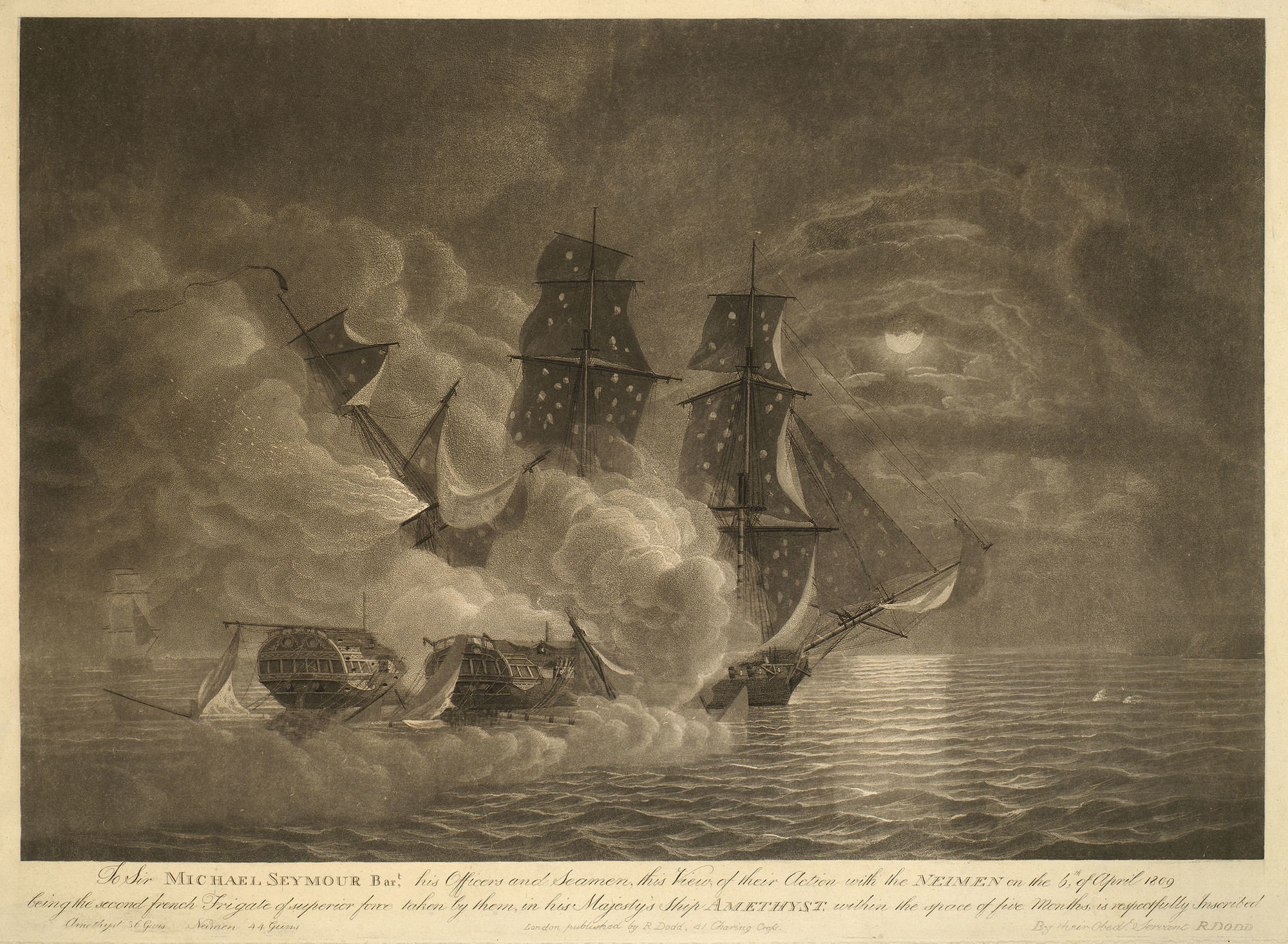
A view of HMS Amethyst capturing the French frigate Niemen in the Cordouan Shoals on 6 April 1809, by Robert Dodd

In 1809, Amethyst was with Sir Robert Stopford's squadron off Rochefort. She saw action in the early stages of the Battle of Brest Roads and in April captured the French frigate Niémen, under the command of Mons. Dupotet, Capitaine de Frigate, at the action of 6 April 1809. Niémen had 47 killed and 73 wounded; Amethyst had eight killed and 37 wounded. In 1847 the Admiralty authorized the issue of the Naval General Service Medal with clasp "Amethyst 5 April 1809".

Later in the year, Seymour participated in the Walcheren Expedition, providing naval support to the transports. On 11 August she was part of a squadron under Captain William Stewart that forced the passage between shore batteries at Flushing and Cadsand. Amethyst had one man killed and one man wounded in the operation. Seymour left the ship in 1809; his replacement in September was Captain Jacob Walton.

Amethyst and Lyra shared in the prize money for the capture on 7 August 1810 of Marie Ange and Marie Louise.

== Fate ==
On 15 February 1811 Amethyst was anchored in Plymouth Sound, intending to sail the next day join the fleet off Brest with provisions, including live bullocks. To facilitate her departure Walton decided to use only her bower anchor. A heavy storm caught her and blew her on shore near Cony Cliff Rocks, Mount Batten, before her crew could lower a second anchor. Lines were passed to the shore that enabled most of the crew to reach safety, though eight men did die. Most of the ship's stores were salvaged over the next few days. Still, the ship was too badly damaged to salvage and by 10 March wave action had broken up the hull.

The subsequent court martial found Walton and Robert Owen, the master, negligent and reprimanded both for allowing Amethyst to be anchored so close to shore and with only one anchor. The court also barred Owen for a year from serving in anything larger than a sixth rate.
