= Richard Boger =

Royal Navy officer (1739–1822)

Admiral of the Blue Richard Boger
- Born: 5 August 1739; St Germans, Cornwall
- Died: 19 October 1822 (aged 83); Plymouth, Devon
- Spouse(s): Maria Carpenter; Mary Drake
- Children: 2
- Relatives: William Otway Boger (great-great-great-grandson), Alnod Boger, Thomas Edward Laws Moore
- Military career
- Allegiance: Great Britain; United Kingdom
- Branch: Royal Navy
- Service years: 1776–1822
- Rank: Admiral of the Blue
- Commands: HMS Vesuvius; HMS Ocean; HMS Blenheim; HMS Hannibal; HMS Cambridge
- Conflicts: American War of Independence; Battle of Cape Spartel

Admiral of the Blue Richard Boger (5 August 1739 – 19 October 1822) was a Royal Navy officer who served in the American War of Independence.

== Early life ==
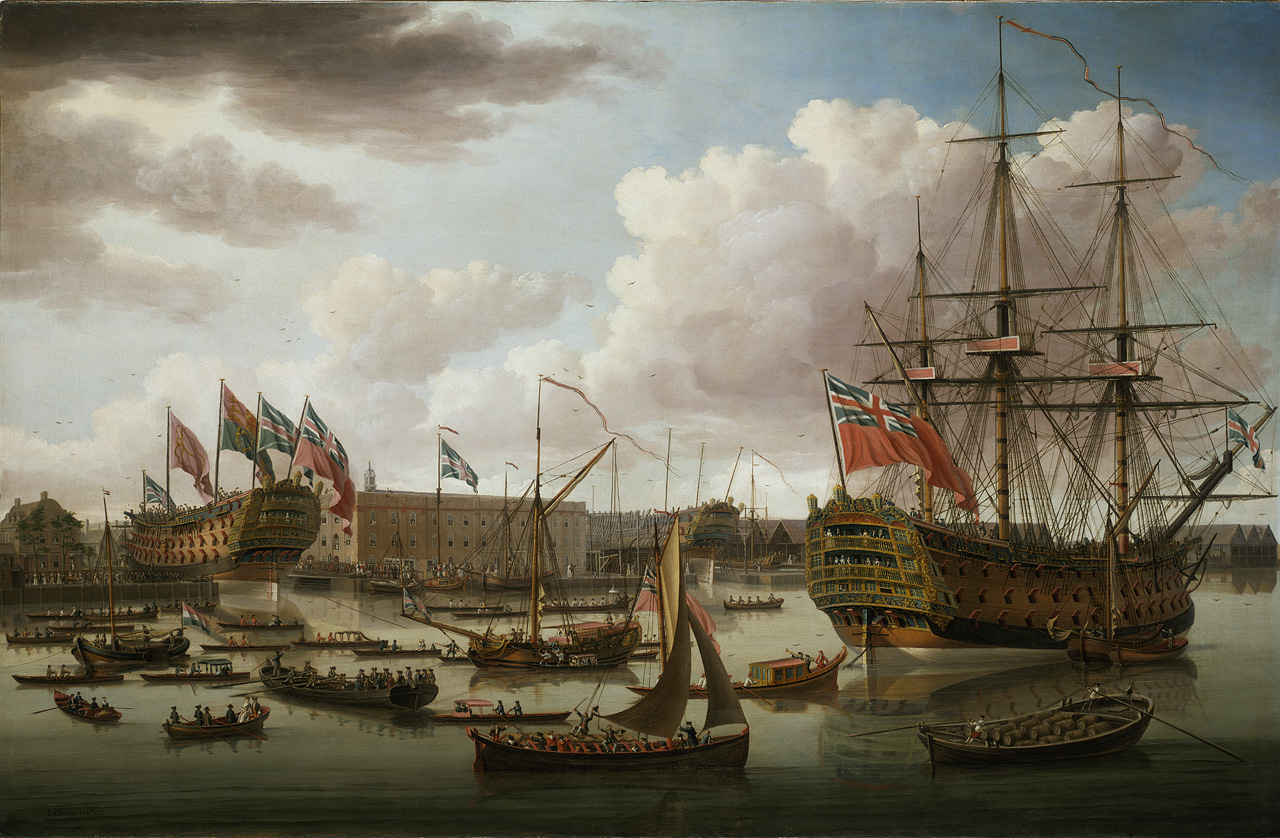
Painting of HMS Cambridge (left), which was captained by Boger

Richard Boger was born on 5 August 1739 at St Germans, Cornwall into a landowning Cornish family seated at Wolsdon House. His father was Richard Boger of St. Germans, a surgeon who is buried in the St Germans Priory. His first wife and mother of his three children was Maria Carpenter, daughter of Nathaniel Carpenter, mayor of Launceston, and progenitor of the Carpenter family of Mount Tavy, later Carpenter-Garnier. Her mother, Sibella Luxmoore, was the daughter of John Luxmoore of Witherdon, Broadwoodwidger and Germansweek, a member of the Devon landed gentry. He is related to John Luxmoore and Charles Luxmoore. When Maria née Carpenter died, Richard remarried Mary Drake in Plymouth, though the couple would have no children.

== Naval career ==
Boger was commissioned on 23 March 1776 as a lieutenant and by 1778 he was offered a position on the flagship of the channel, HMS Victory. On 2 April 1782 he was given his first command, the 8-gun bomb vessel HMS Vesuvius. Following this he briefly commanded the Foudroyant (80 guns) for Captain John Jervis, 1st Earl of St Vincent, before being posted as captain on HMS Ocean (90 guns) on 6 July 1782, serving in the Battle of Cape Spartel.

Following these positions, he commanded HMS Blenheim (90 guns) and during the Dutch Armament, he commissioned HMS Hannibal (74 guns) for the flag of Rear-Admiral Sir John Jervis. His career culminated when he was made captain of the Plymouth guardship, HMS Cambridge.

== Spithead and Nore mutinies ==
During the Spithead and Nore mutinies, mutineers imprisoned Boger in his cabin. However, having been a great favourite of the crew, he was treated well for a prisoner, with his wife Mary and daughter Maria, receiving two delegates every day.

After the mutiny had come to an end and the crew and officers disembarked their ships, the whole fleet walked in procession, hand in hand around Plymouth. It is said that the favourite officers of the crew were put into open carriages, one of these favourites was Admiral Boger. He was subsequently paraded around the dock and Stonehouse, with one family member describing: "I shall never forget our old relative Admiral Boger, in an open carriage drawn by four horses, exposed to a scorching sun in the middle of a very hot July, without a hat, but with his hair fully dressed and powdered, and in his full uniform, with a face as red as scarlet from heat and excitement. In vain did he constantly request to have a glass of water. The sailors, horrified at the request, told him that "his Honour might have any sort of grog, but that as for water, they would not suffer his Honour to drink it.". He was eventually set down in front of his door with the crowd giving him three tremendous cheers, before taking their leave. Boger continued to serve in the Royal Navy until his death on 19 October 1822.

== Arms and heraldry ==
Richard Boger was granted arms on the 8th of September 1817. His coat and crest are described as:

Or, a bend vair gu. and arg. cotised az. hetto. two castles sa., a canton of the fourth charged loith sivord ppr., pommel and hilt gold, surmounting an anchor saltire ways of the last. Crest, A castle or, charged with two lozenges conjoined in fess vair gu. and arg., thereon perched a dove with an olive-branch in its beak ppr.

— Jewers, Arthur John, Heraldic church notes from Cornwall
