= HMS Antigua (1779) =

British Royal Navy 14-gun sloop

History

United Kingdom
- Name: HMS Antigua
- Namesake: Antigua, an island in the West Indies
- In service: August 1779
- Fate: Sold 12 January 1792

General characteristics
- Type: Sloop
- Armament: 14 guns

HMS Antigua was a 14-gun sloop that served in the British Royal Navy from 1779 to 1792. In contemporary records she is sometimes referred to as "His Majesty's armed brig Antigua".

== American Revolutionary War ==
Between 1780 and 1782 she was under the command of Lieutenant Robert Barton, and captured several prizes.

- On 28 December, 1777 she captured the American privateer Nancy.
- On 25 December 1780 she captured two Dutch ships, the Vrouw Elizabeth and Stad Workum.
- On 9 August 1781 she retook the French privateer Defiance.
- On 23 December 1781 she was in company with Squirrel, Dunkirk, and Cambridge at the capture of the Dutch ship De Vrow Esther.
- On 28 April 1782, Antigua and the cutter Viper brought into Waterford a French privateer lugger and her prize. The prize was a sloop that had been sailing from London to Cork with merchandise when the privateer took her.

Antigua was in service in August 1789.

== Fate ==
Antigua was sold on 12 January 1792.
