= HMS Conquest =

Three ships of the Royal Navy have borne the name HMS Conquest:

- HMS Conquest (1794) was a 12-gun gunvessel launched in 1794 and sold in 1817.
- HMS Conquest (1878) was a screw corvette launched in 1878 and sold in 1899.
- HMS Conquest (1915) was a C-class light cruiser launched in 1915 and sold in 1930.

== See also ==
- HMS Conquestador
