= HMS Atalante (1797) =

Sloop of the Royal Navy

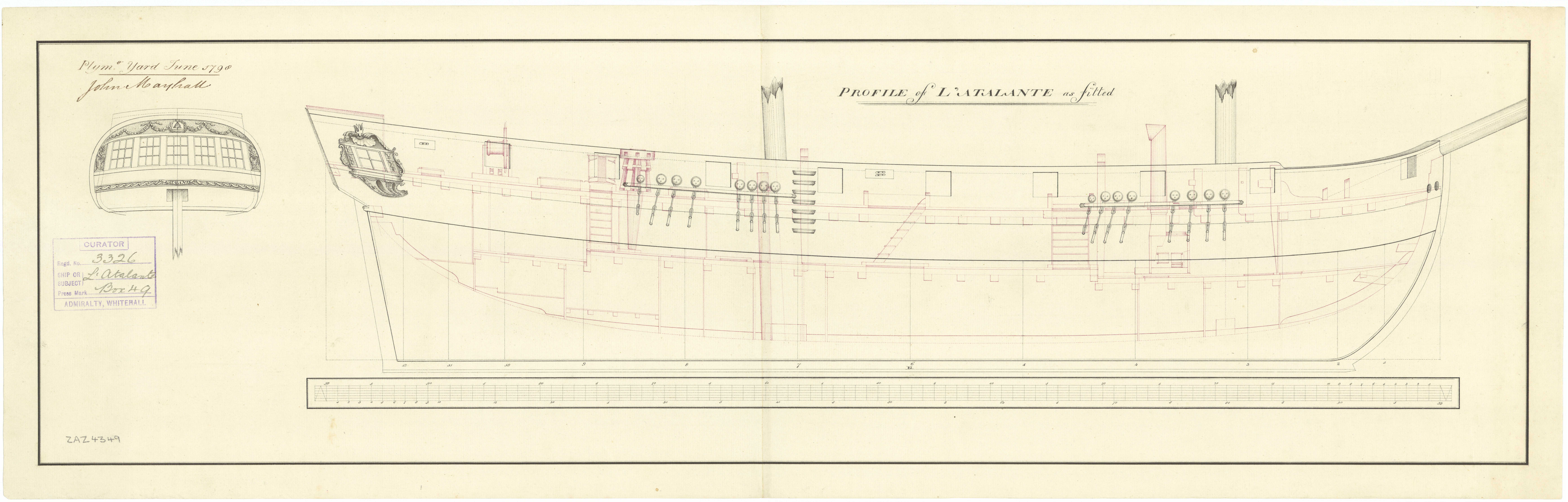
- Drawing of Atalante showing the inboard profile with stern quarter decoration, and stern board outline with decoration detail, 1798

History

France
- Name: Atalante
- Builder: Bayonne
- Laid down: 1793
- Launched: January 1794
- Completed: By April 1794
- Captured: 10 January 1797, by the Royal Navy

Great Britain
- Name: HMS Atalante
- Acquired: 10 January 1797
- Commissioned: July 1798
- Fate: Wrecked on 12 February 1807

General characteristics
- Class & type: 16-gun brig-sloop
- Displacement: 450 tons (French)
- Tons burthen: 309 80/94 (bm)
- Length: 99 ft (30.2 m) (overall); 78 ft 8 in (24.0 m) (keel)
- Beam: 27 ft 8 in (8.4 m)
- Depth of hold: 12 ft 2 1/4 in (3.7 m)
- Propulsion: Sails
- Complement: French service=*120; When captured: 112; British service: 90
- Armament: As fitted:16 × 6-pounder guns; British service: 14 × 24-pounder carronades + 2 × 6-pounder bow chasers

HMS Atalante was a 16-gun brig-sloop of the Royal Navy. She was formerly the French Atalante, captured in 1797. She served with the British during the French Revolutionary and Napoleonic Wars, and was wrecked in 1807.

== French service and capture ==
Atalante was a brig built at Bayonne between 1793 and 1794 to a design by Raymond-Antoine Haran. She was launched in January 1794 as the only ship built to her design.

Between 28 January 1794 and 9 October, Atalante was under the command of lieutenant de vaisseau Soustra. She sailed from Bayonne to Brest, before cruising in the vicinity of the Azores and then returning to Brest.

Atalante participated in the Croisière du Grand Hiver, an unsuccessful sortie by the French fleet at Brest on 24 December 1794. She then returned to Bayonne, and later Brest.

By 13 October 1795, she was at Concarneau and under the command of enseigne de vaisseau Dordelin.

HMS Phoebe captured Atalante on 10 January 1797 off the Scilly Isles. At capture she was under the command of now lieutenant de vaisseaux Dordelin, and had a crew of 112 men. Her captors reported that she was a three-year-old brig with a coppered hull and an 80-foot keel. The British took her back to Portsmouth. She was registered there before being sent on to Plymouth, where the Navy had her fitted out between June and September 1798.

== French Revolutionary Wars ==
Atalante was commissioned under Commander Digby Dent in July 1798, but was paid off in October that year. Recommissioned in December, this time under Commander Anselm Griffiths, she went on to have a particularly successful career against French privateers.

On 20 February 1799, she and Boadicea captured the French privateer cutter Milan. Milan was armed with 14 guns and had a crew of 44 men. Atalante took the prize into port.

On 4 December, Atalante captured the privateer lugger Succès (or Success). Atalante came upon a lugger in the act of capturing a brig, and immediately set off in pursuit. The privateer abandoned her prize and tried to escape. About three hours later, Atalante dropped off her master in her jolly boat to recapture the brig, and continued the pursuit without stopping. After a pursuit of about 11 hours, Atalante finally caught up with and captured the privateer. Succès was armed with six guns and had a crew of 48 men under the command of Francois Matthieu Blondin. She was six days out of Boulogne and the interrupted capture was her first prize. The master, Edward Lewington, and crew of the prize were aboard Succès and they reported that they had been sailing from London to Belfast when the privateer had captured them the night before west of Dungeness.

On 29 January 1801, Atalante captured and destroyed the Spanish privateer Intrepido Cid. Sirius and Amethyst shared, by agreement, in the bounty-money.

On 26 February 1801, she sent into Plymouth the Bon Aventura, which had been sailing from St Ullus to Limerick when the French privateer Grande Decide, of 18 guns, had captured her. Atalante had recaptured Bon Avenura.

On 1 April 1801, Atalante was in company with Viper when they encountered four French privateers off Land's End. Three of the privateers escaped. Nevertheless, Atalante pursued one and after a chase of 17 hours captured her. She turned out to be the brig Héros, of Saint Malo. She was armed with 14 guns and had a crew of 73 men under the command of her master, Renne Crosse.

On 10 August 1801, Atalante's cutter, manned by eight men, captured the 58-ton lugger Eveillé in Quiberon Bay. The lugger was armed with two 4-pounder guns and four 1½-pounder swivel guns. As the cutter approached, the lugger fired on the cutter, as did some small shore batteries. The lugger was within small-arms range of the shore and as the crew of the cutter boarded the lugger, the lugger's crew abandoned her. The British suffered no casualties. Captain A.J. Griffiths made no mention of signs of French casualties and described the lugger as being in the "Service of the Republic". At about the same time, Atalante also captured three light boats.

On 24 August 1801, a prize to Atalante, a French dogger with a cargo of wines and brandies, came into Plymouth.

Griffiths was succeeded in May 1802 by Commander Joseph Masefield, who operated out of Portland. On 13 June 1802, Masefield sailed Atalante on an anti-smuggling patrol. On 1 October 1802, he sent in to Portsmouth a large smuggling vessel with 360 casks of spirits and 20 bales of tobacco. Then the next week, he sent in a lugger with 170 ankers of spirits, a sloop with 120, and a large boat with 400. On 14 October 1802, he brought into Plymouth the 80-ton Admiral Pole, of Exeter, which Atalante caught after a long chase. She too had been carrying 170 ankers of spirits. Admiral Pole had been captured some months earlier at Weymouth and then released after posting bond with the Board of Customs and Excise.

== Napoleonic Wars ==
When Masefield (or Mansfield) recommissioned Atalante on 10 January 1803, two days after paying her off, he apparently did not want for crew. His success on anti-smuggling patrol had apparently resulted in his previous crew earning prize money the equivalent of their pay for the six-month period. Masefield had captured eight smuggling vessels and seized 1,000 ankers of spirits, in addition to bale goods.

On 14 March 1803, Atalante sailed from Plymouth to retrieve the sloop Galgo from Mount's Bay, where she had taken refuge, having been dismasted in a gale. Atalante returned the next day with Galgo. That same day Atalante and Nemesis sailed under sealed orders to Cawsand Bay where they received further orders that sent them to Bristol to impress seamen. On 13 May 1803, Nemesis and Atalante returned to Plymouth from a cruise that had them monitoring French naval movements off Brest. On 16 June 1803, a French brig, prize to Atalante came into Plymouth.

On 7 June 1803, Atlante captured the merchant ship Ocean. Then one month later, on 8 July 1803, Atalante captured the French ship Prudent. Then on 24 September 1803, Atalante captured four French merchant vessels. These were the Jeune Adelphie, Marie Elizabeth, Betzée, and Fortunée.

On 9 October 1803, Atalante pursued two ketches and a brig at Saint Gildas Point. The quarry ran ashore near the mouth of the Pennerf river. Mansfield then sent in his boats on a cutting out expedition. One boat captured one of the ketches but couldn't bring her off; while they were so engaged they endured fire from soldiers on board the other ketch and troops with two field guns on the beach. The boarding party then abandoned their vessel and went to the assistance of the party that had boarded the brig. That party had killed six of the 10 or 12 soldiers on the brig, thrown two over board, and driven the rest and the crew below decks. The boarding party was unable to get the brig off the shore so they abandoned her without setting her on fire in consideration of the men below decks. Atalante lost one man killed and two wounded in the operation. The next day, Masefield was pleased to see that the brig was on a ridge of rocks and "apparently bilged".

That same day, i.e., 9 October, there came into Plymouth a large lugger with brandy, wine, and Castile soup that Atalante's boats had cut out near Brest. The three timber vessels they cut out at the same time turn out more valuable than had initially been expected because their cargo turned out to be timber of different scantlings for first and second rates. The timber vessels had been sailing to 1'Orient, where several ships were building.

On 24 March 1804, Atalante captured the French chasse maree Volante. Volante from Nantes, arrived at Plymouth in early April.

In July 1805, Atalante captured the Belissaire and the Napoleon, carrying brandy and rosin, and sent them into Plymouth.

On 20 May 1806, Atalante captured the Fortuna Waggona. Atalante was also in sight when Iris captured the French ketch Amis de Juste. That same month Atalante captured the Noord Termans, Wagener, master, as she was sailing from St. Martin's to Bremen. Atalante sent her into Plymouth.

Atalante was assigned to the squadron under Sir Samuel Hood on 25 September 1806. On 19 October 1806, Indefatigable, Hazard and Atalante captured the chasse marees Achille, Jenny and Marianne.

In 1807, Lieutenant John Bowker took over command in an acting capacity. When he took command, Bowker requested that Atalante be surveyed. He noted that when the wind blew fresh, water would enter at a rate of 20 inches per hour. He was refused. Later, Sir Samuel Hood testified in Parliament that Commander Keats had assured him that Atalante was seaworthy. Bowker's time in command was short-lived.

== Fate ==
On 12 February 1807, Atalante was wrecked off the Île de Ré, near Rochefort. She had been cruising to watch enemy vessels in Rochefort when she hit the Grande Blanche rock at 10 pm. Despite attempts to lighten her that included cutting away her masts, she continued to founder. At daybreak, three British vessels approached and took off the crew, enduring fire from shore batteries as they did so. The first was the cutter Nile, followed later by the frigates Penelope and Pomone. During the night, some of the crewmen took two of Atalante's boats without permission. The cutter, with 22 men, reached shore, where the French took them prisoner. The jolly boat, with the gunner and six men, headed out to sea where a ship from the British blockading squadron picked them up. The gunner, John Brockman, had been officer of the watch when Atalante had struck. He had ignored Lieutenant Bowker's order not to take her into shallow water and had ignored the advice of the French pilot, M. Legall, who was on board in an advisory capacity. That Brockman had left without permission during the night further undermined his case at the court martial for the loss of the ship. The board ordered Brockman disrated.
