= French ship Alcide (1743) =

Ship of the line of the French Navy

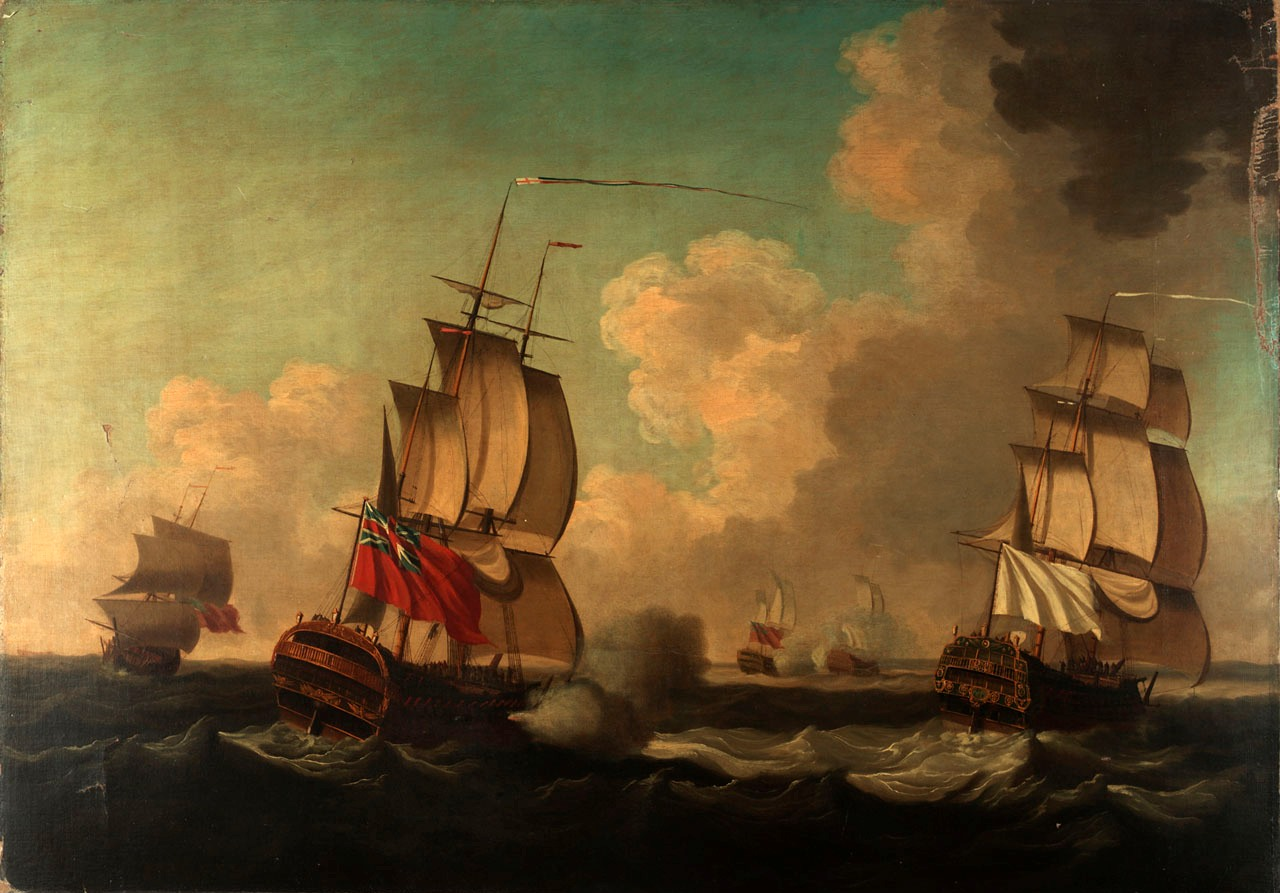
- Capture of Alcide near Louisbourg

History

France
- Name: Alcide
- Ordered: October 1741
- Builder: Brest Naval Dockyard
- Laid down: March 1742
- Launched: 6 December 1743
- Commissioned: 1744
- Captured: 8 June 1755, by Royal Navy

Great Britain
- Name: Alcide
- Acquired: 8 June 1755
- Fate: Sold, 1772

General characteristics
- Class & type: 64-gun third-rate ship of the line
- Displacement: 2,000 tonneaux
- Tons burthen: 1,100 port tonneaux
- Length: 159 ft (48 m) (gundeck); 128 ft 4.5 in (39.129 m) (gundeck)
- Beam: 44 ft 10.25 in (13.6716 m)
- Depth of hold: 18 ft 2.375 in (5.54673 m)
- Propulsion: Sails
- Sail plan: Full-rigged ship
- Armament: 64 guns of various weights of shot

Alcide was a 64-gun ship of the line of the French Navy, launched in 1742. The captain of the vessel was Toussaint Hocquart, for the re-enforcement campaign that was sent to Canada in May 1755.

On 8 June 1755, Alcide was captured by HMS Dunkirk and HMS Torbay of Vice-Admiral Edward Boscawen's squadron, and commissioned into the Royal Navy in 1757 as the third-rate HMS Alcide.

HMS Alcide was sold out of the navy in May 1772. However, it perhaps remained in service in some form because on 10 July 1772 according to the UK, Register of Duties Paid for Apprentices' Indentures, 1710–1811, Robert Mellefent was apprenticed as a carpenter to Ebenezer Holland to serve on the ship.

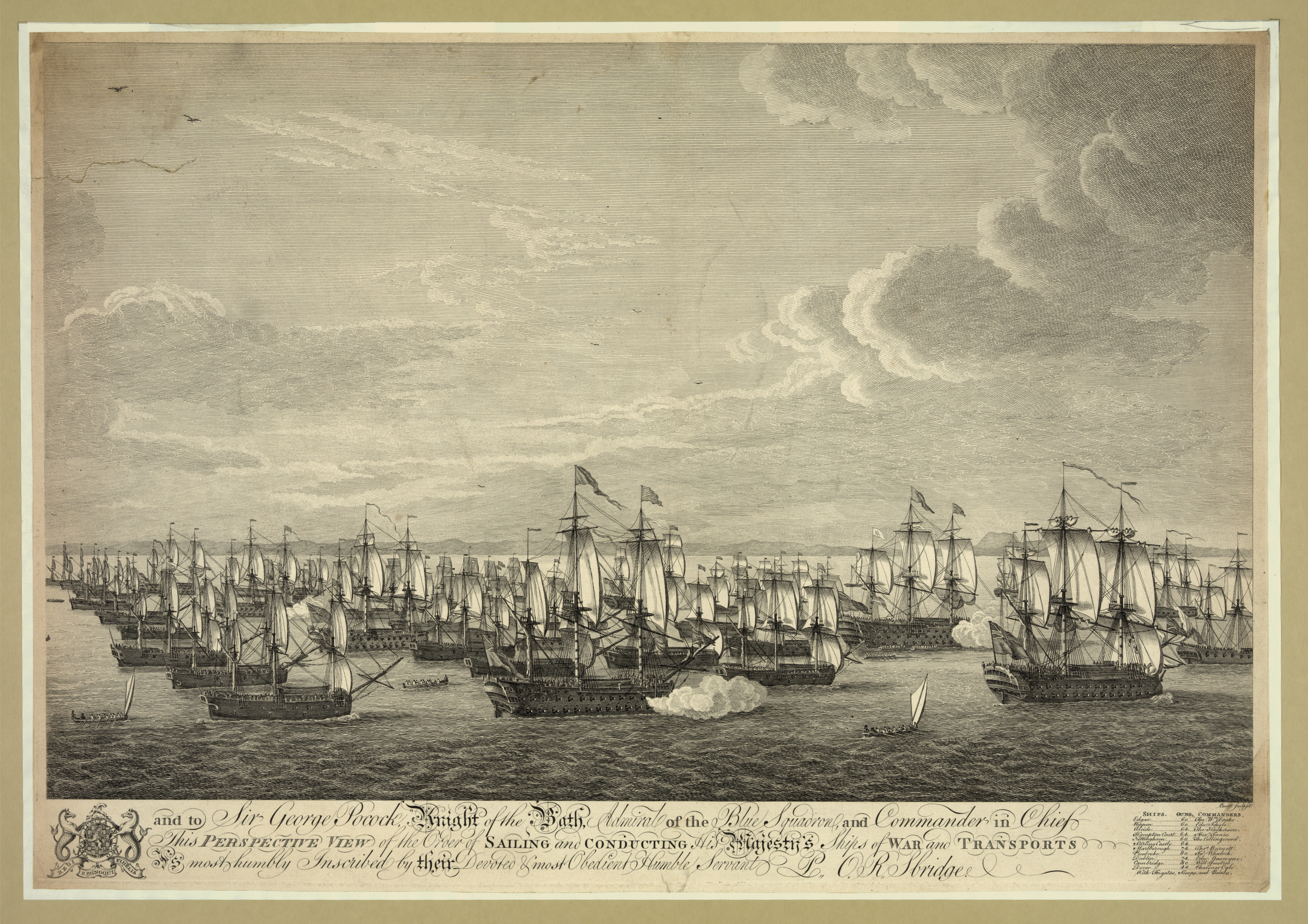
Shown here as a member Sir George Pocock's Blue Squadron, circa 1762

Plan of Alcide

Another plan of Alcide

== See also ==
- List of ships captured in the 18th century
- Father Le Loutre's War
