= HMS Cambridge (1755) =

Ship of the line of the Royal Navy

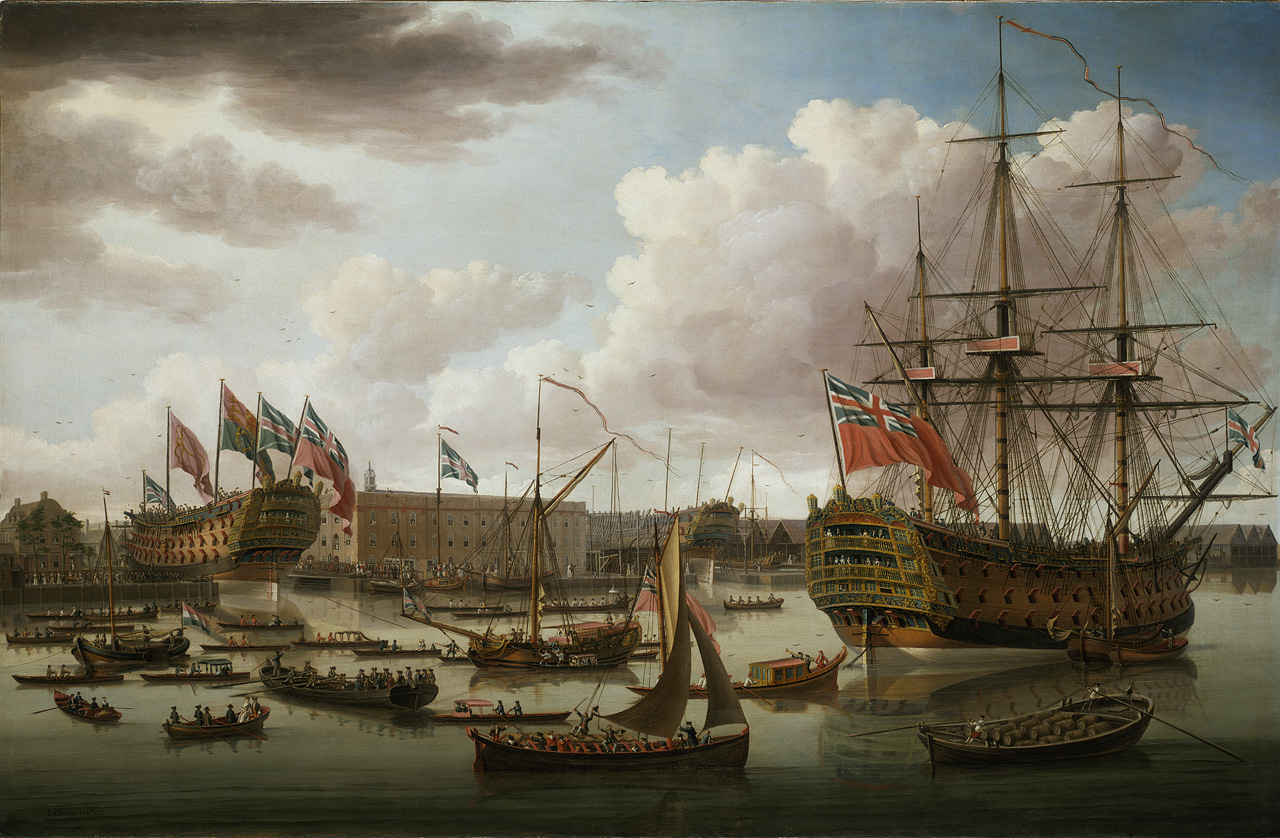
- The launch of HMS Cambridge, left, in 1755 (with HMS Royal George shown fictitiously, right).

History

Great Britain
- Name: HMS Cambridge
- Ordered: 12 July 1750
- Builder: Deptford Dockyard
- Laid down: 29 August 1750
- Launched: 21 October 1755
- Commissioned: 17 January 1756
- Fate: Broken up in July 1808
- Notes: Participated in: Capture of Havana, 1762

General characteristics
- Class & type: 1750 amendments 80-gun third rate ship of the line
- Tons burthen: 1636 17/94 (bm)
- Length: 166 ft (50.6 m) (gundeck)
- Beam: 47 ft (14.3 m)
- Depth of hold: 20 ft (6.1 m)
- Propulsion: Sails
- Sail plan: Full-rigged ship
- Armament: 80 guns: Gundeck: 26 × 32 pdrs; Middle gundeck: 26 × 18 pdrs; Upper gundeck: 24 × 9 pdrs; Quarterdeck: 4 × 6 pdrs

HMS Cambridge was an 80-gun third-rate ship of the line of the Royal Navy, designed by Sir Joseph Allin and built at Deptford Dockyard by Adam Hayes to the draught specified by the 1745 Establishment as amended in 1750, and launched on 21 October 1755.

== Early career ==
Cambridge’s first captain was Sir Peircy Brett, who had previously been in command of HMY Royal Caroline. He was moved to the Cambridge in expectation of the outbreak of hostilities with France. With the outbreak of the Seven Years' War, Brett left the command in November or December 1756. He was replaced by Captain William Gordon. Gordon also did not spend long aboard Cambridge, leaving in April 1757 to take command of the newly launched HMS Princess Amelia. His successor was Captain Thomas Burnet, who was promoted to Post-Captain on 5 May. Cambridge then became Commodore Sir John Moore's flagship on the West Indies Station.

Cambridge remained on this station for several years. In January 1759 Sir John was reinforced with a fleet dispatched from England under the command of Commodore Robert Hughes, consisting of eight two-deckers, a frigate and four bomb ketches. They were also transporting a number of troops under the command of General Peregrine Hopson. They were instructed to make attacks on French settlements in the West Indies. The first of these was a British expedition against Guadeloupe, for which Moore transferred his flag to HMS Woolwich. Cambridge, in company with HMS Norfolk and HMS St George, were ordered to attack the main citadel. The resulting attack lasted from nine in the morning until four in the afternoon, and succeeded in silencing the defences. After this success Commodore Hughes returned to Britain in June, taking Burnet and the Cambridge with him.

== Later operations in the Caribbean ==
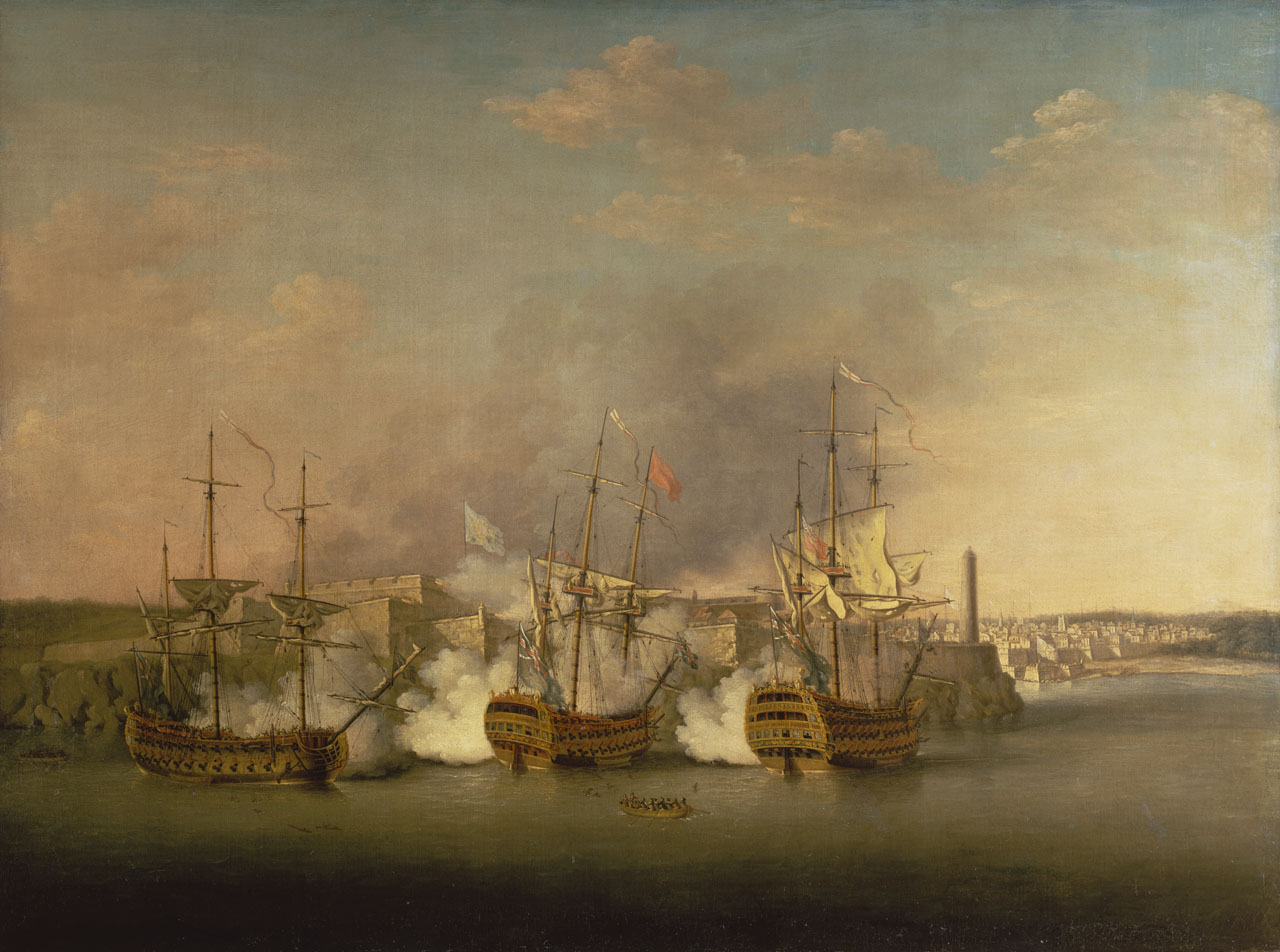
The bombardment of Morro Castle on Havana – Lindsay is being rowed out from Trent to take command of Cambridge, right

Both Burnet and Cambridge were back in the West Indies later in 1759, Cambridge again serving as Commodore John Moore's flagship on the Leeward Islands Station. In 1760 Burnet was replaced by Captain William Goostrey, and Cambridge became the flagship of Rear Admiral Charles Holmes, who had replaced Moore and was commanding out of Jamaica. Cambridge then formed part of Sir George Pocock's fleet at the taking of Havana from the Spanish in 1762. During that action she, HMS Dragon and HMS Marlborough were ordered on 1 July to bombard and capture the Moro Fort. Cambridge's captain, William Goostrey, was killed by rifle fire from the fort and John Lindsay – then captain of HMS Trent – took over command whilst the battle was still in progress. Cambridge's eventual casualties were 24 killed, including her captain, and 95 wounded.

== Return to Britain ==
By 1779 Cambridge was under the command of Captain Broderick Hartwell, and was serving as a guardship at Plymouth. Hartwell left the Cambridge in 1781 when he was appointed to be lieutenant-governor of Greenwich Hospital. On 23 December 1781 she was in company with Squirrel, Dunkirk, and Antigua at the capture of the Dutch ship De Vrow Esther.

During the Spanish armament of 1790 Cambridge became the flagship of Vice-Admiral Thomas Graves, and was commanded by Captain William Locker. Cambridge was reduced to harbour service in 1793 and continued as the Plymouth guardship, being commanded by Captain Richard Boger.

Cambridge was at Plymouth on 20 January 1795 and so shared in the proceeds of the detention of the Dutch naval vessels, East Indiamen, and other merchant vessels that were in port on the outbreak of war between Britain and the Netherlands.

From 1797 Cambridge served as the flagship of Vice-Admiral Richard King. She also transferred survivors from the wreck of HMS Colossus in 1798 to HMS Castor from the brigs which had initially rescued them . In 1800 Cambridge was the flagship of Vice-Admiral Sir Thomas Pasley. She was broken up at Plymouth in July 1808.
