= HMS Squirrel (1755) =

History

Great Britain
- Name: HMS Squirrel
- Ordered: 30 October 1754
- Builder: King's Yard, Woolwich, M/Shipwright Edward Allin
- Laid down: 19 March 1755
- Launched: 23 October 1755
- Completed: 28 December 1755
- Commissioned: October 1755
- Out of service: Sold 16 January 1783
- Honours and awards: Siege of Louisbourg (1758); Battle of Quebec (1759)
- Fate: Sold 1784

Great Britain
- Name: Union
- Owner: 1784: Montgomery; 1790:Calvert & Co.
- Acquired: 1784 by purchase
- Fate: Last listed in 1804

General characteristics
- Tons burthen: 400, or 40351/94, or 451, or 476 (after rebuilding), or 479 (bm)
- Length: 107 ft 3 in (32.7 m) (gundeck); 89 ft 5 1/4 in (27.3 m) (keel)
- Beam: 29 ft 1 1/2 in (8.9 m)
- Depth of hold: 9 ft 2 in (2.8 m)
- Propulsion: Sails
- Complement: HMS: 160; 1793:70
- Armament: HMS: 20 × 9-pounder guns; 1793:20 × 12-pounder guns; 1802:12 × 12-pounder guns + 2 × 12-pounder carronades

HMS Squirrel was a Royal Navy sixth rate post ship, built in 1755. She served during the French and Indian War, most notably at Louisbourg and Quebec, and the American Revolution, during which she captured two French privateers. The Royal Navy sold her in 1783. J. Montgomery purchased her and she became the Greenland whaler Union. Then in 1790–91 she became a slaver, making five slave-trading voyages. Between 1796 and 1802 she made two voyages for the British East India Company (EIC). She then traded between London and Liverpool. She was last listed in 1804.

== Career ==
=== Royal Navy service ===
==== Seven Years War (1756–1763) ====
Captain Hyde Parker commissioned Squirrel in October 1755. A year or so later, on 10 October 1756 he captured the privateer Très Vénėrable.

On 31 May 1757 Squirrel captured the American ship America, Lewis Ferret, master. Her owners appealed the seizure but the court of appeal ruled that America had delivered a cargo to San Domingo, and there picked up another cargo, owned by French subjects and all pursuant to French taxes, duties, etc., and having destroyed her documents, America was de facto a French ship and so the condemnation as a prize should stand.

On 17 June Squirrel and Parker were at Embden where she stopped any forage being brought in to the French forces there. Around December Commander Joshua Loring was in command of Squirrel, and was promoted to post captain on 19 December. That same month Captain John Wheelock assumed command of Squirrel.

Wheelock sailed Squirrel for North America on 15 January 1758. Squirrel was part of the British naval force at the siege of Louisbourg in 1757. During the landings at Gabarus Bay on 8 June she provided fire support on the right flank. At this time she was under the command of Commander George Hamilton.

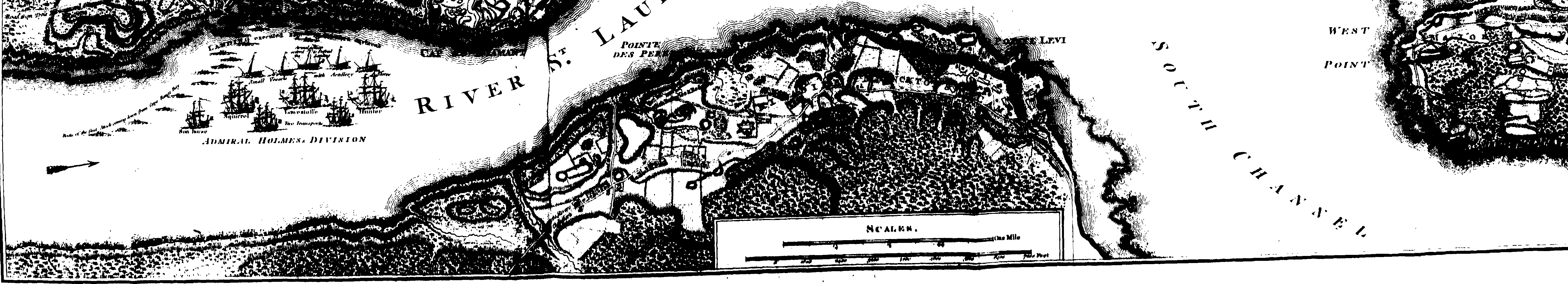
Squirrel in the Saint Lawrence River, 1759

During the summer of 1759 Squirrel was part of the British naval force at the siege of Quebec. On 18 July she, under Hamilton's command, was part of a small squadron that ran up the river past the city. The vessels included Sutherland, of 50 guns, three transports with three companies of grenadiers and a battalion of the Royal Americans, and two armed sloops. Diana, of 32 guns, was part of the squadron, but she grounded and did not make the passage. Squirrel was among the Royal Navy vessels that received prize money for the capture of a number of small vessels in the St Lawrence River in 1759.

At some point Squirrel came under the command of Captain John Cleland, either before or after she returned to England. On 31 January 1760 he sailed her for the Mediterranean.

On 5 February 1760 Squirrel was escorting a fleet from Cork to Gibraltar. Lloyd's List reported on 17 June that Squirrel and Kennington had carried into Leghorn a French ship that had been sailing from Marseilles to Constantinople. This may have been the polacca St. Francis de Paul that they captured on 9 May, in company with Cygnet. More probably, it may have been the polacca St Barbe that Squirrel and Kennington captured on 22 May.

Squirrel returned to England and was paid off in June. At some point she was recommissioned. On 15 March 1761 Squirrel captured the pinque Marie.

In 1762 Squirrel was in North America. In April she was in the Mediterranean and under the command of Captain James Cranston. He was still in command at the end of the Seven Years' War on 23 February 1763.

==== Between wars ====
In May Captain Richard Smith recommissioned Squirrel as she underwent fitting at Chatham between May and July. He then sailed her for the West Indies on 28 August.

From 1764 to 1766 she was stationed at New Jersey. There she was used to enforce customs laws in New England prior to the American Revolution. In 1764 while in Newport, Rhode Island Squirrel came to the assistance of HMS St John, which American colonists on Goat Island (Rhode Island) had fired on. The colonists dispersed before Squirrel brought her guns to bear.

Squirrel returned to England and was paid off in January 1767. Between January and September she was at Chatham undergoing repairs and fitting out. Captain John Botterell commissioned her in July, and sailed her for the Leeward Islands on 9 October 1787.

In November 1769 she was still in the Leeward Islands, and her commander was Captain Edward Cauldwell. She returned to England and was paid off in January 1772.

In January Squirrel underwent a survey at Sheerness. Then between April 1772 and January 1774 she underwent a great repair there, and fitting out. In November 1773 Captain Stair Douglass recommissioned her. He then sailed for Jamaica on 31 January 1774.

==== American Revolutionary War ====
By March 1775 Squirrel was one of only five vessels on the Jamaica Station. In November, Admiral Clark Gayton, commanding the Jamaica Station, issued orders to Douglass to sail to the "little Caicos" and there to intercept and detain vessels coming from the island and carrying military stores to the rebels. By December Squirrel was stationed at "Little Caicos".

In January 1776 Squirrel was still one of only five vessels on the Jamaica Station. Stephen Fuller, agent for the island of Jamaica, on 27 January wrote to Lord Germain listing the vessels available on that the station and pointing out that there were too few to provide an escort for the next fleet leaving the island.

During the month Squirrel sent into Jamaica two sloops, one from Cape Nichola with French produce, and the other from the Turks Islands, with salt. Both were sailing to "the Rebellious Colonies". The first was the sloop Cornelia, of New York, Robert Sands, master, taken on 29 December 1775 with a cargo of molasses and coffee. The second was the sloop Affie & Hannah, of New York, Benjamin Bell, master, taken on 2 January 1776 with a cargo of salt.

Next, Squirrel sent in a schooner to Port Royal with French produce and French papers. When Douglass examined her he had discovered that her mate and three seamen were English. The mate confessed that her home port was Philadelphia and that the master had hidden her English papers. There was sufficient evidence to prove that she was an American vessel and so subject to condemnation. This was the sloop Thames, of Philadelphia, J. Fairibelt, master, taken on 30 January with a cargo of rum and molasses.

On 10 February Jamaica was unsettled by Douglass's report that he had encountered three French ships, part of a flotilla bringing 17,000 men to Hispaniola. On 25 March Squirrel took the brig Industry, of South Carolina, Edward Allen, master, sailing in ballast.

In late 1776 the former slave Olaudah Equiano came under Douglass's protection after Equiano got into a dispute in Jamaica with a local notable. (Note: One of the crew on Squirrel was Richard Yorke, a fellow black, with whom Equiano had served on Racehorse in 1773 during Captain Constantine John Phipps's expedition to the Arctic.) Equiano sailed with Douglass back to England. On the way Squirrel captured an American privateer. Squirrel arrived back in England on 7 January 1777 at Plymouth.

Between January and March 1777 Squirrel was at Portsmouth, undergoing fitting. Captain Henry Harvey recommissioned her and sailed her for Newfoundland on 14 April. She sailed with the African trade on 15 February 1778.

On 6 September Squirrel took Betsy.

In 1779 Squirrel was in home waters and under the command of Captain Farmery Epworth. In April 1780 Captain Thomas Piercy replaced Epworth. Between October and December 1781 Squirrel was at Plymouth receiving copper sheathing, and being refitted.

Still, on 23 December 1781 Squirrel was in company with Antigua, Dunkirk, and Cambridge at the capture of the Dutch ship De Vrow Esther.

Captain John Inglis assumed command in 1782. On 15 February Squirrel captured the privateer Furet. Furet may have been the cutter of 10 guns that other records show Inglis capturing.

On 21 June, Squirrel, Captain John Inglis, encountered a French privateer cutter off Lands End and chased for ten hours before she struck her colours. She proved to be Aimable Manon, of eight guns and 42 men. She was 14 days out of Brest and had caught nothing.

Then four days later, Squirrel recaptured Penelope, which had been sailing from Liverpool to Cork with a cargo of salt and sugar when the French privateer Escamoteur had captured her going into Waterford. Lloyd's List reported on 5 July 1782 that Squirrel had sent Penelope into Falmouth.

==== Disposal ====
The Navy paid Squirrel off at the end of June. It sold her on 16 January 1783 at Sheerness for £1,100, plus an additional £302 5s for the copper on her bottom.

=== Commercial service as Union ===
==== Whaler ====
J.Montgomery purchased Squirrel, renamed her Union, and used her as a whaler in the waters off Greenland. particularly Davis Strait. (Note: Earlier, Montgomery had purchased another Union, the former bomb ketch HMS Terror, of 300 tons (bm), which the Royal Navy had sold in 1775. The ex-Terror Union was lost in May 1782. Hackman, in his book on the vessels of the British East India Company, conflates the two Unions.) Lloyd's Register (1786) reports that she underwent repairs in 1786, and the listing also gives her burthen as 400 tons, instead of 300 tons as in the 1784 volume. On 11 July 1786 Lloyd's List reported that Union was still with other whalers at Greenland and had taken three "fish".

On 17 June 1787 she was among the whalers at Greenland and had taken two "fish". Union underwent further repairs in 1787 and 1789.

==== Slaver ====
Then in 1790 J. Chapman replaced J. Bailie as master, and her trade became London—Africa. That is, she became a slaver. Lloyd's Register (1791) shows that her owner became Calvert & Co., and that she underwent coppering, and a thorough repair. (Note: Lloyd's Register shows an increase in her burthen, but this seems simply a clerical error in that later issues of Lloyd's Register, and the 1793 letter of marque declaration do not confirm the change.)

Her master became James Tomson and Union then made five slave-trading voyages, primarily between the Gold Coast and Jamaica. Her owners were Anthony Calvert, Thomas King, and William Camden.

On her first voyage Thomson sailed from England on 18 May 1790, and arrived at the Gold Coast on 9 August. He gathered his slaves at Cape Coast Castle and Anomabu. Union sailed from Africa on 20 October, and arrived at Jamaica 13 December. She arrived with 461 slaves at Black River. She arrived back at London on 22 July 1791.

On her second voyage, Thomson left London on 26 August, and arrived at the Gold Coast on 13 October. He gathered slaves at Cape Lahoue and Cape Coast Castle, but primarily at Anomabu. Union sailed from Africa 15 January 1792, and arrived at Kingston, Jamaica, 2 March. There she discharged 536 slaves, having embarked 543. Her loss rate was only 1.3%. At some point her master changed to Robert Currie. She sailed from Jamaica on 10 April, but bound for Africa again, rather than home.

Thomson had returned to command of Union and she gathered her slaves at Anomabu and Cape Coast Castle. She left Africa on 21 October, and arrived back at Jamaica on 16 December. She had embarked 549 slaves, and arrived with 549. She returned to London 5 May 1793.

Shortly before Union returned to England, war with France broke out. James Thompson received a letter of marque on 18 June 1793.

Or her fourth slaving voyage, Thomson and Union left London on 10 July and arrived at Africa on 19 September. She again gathered slaves at Cape Coast Castle and Anomabu, and arrived at Jamaica on 15 May 1794 with 535. Union arrived back at London on 19 August.

Thomson sailed Union on her fifth, and last, slave voyage, leaving from London on 31 October, bound for the Gold Coast. She arrived there on 6 April 1795, and gathered her slaves at Cape Coast Castle and Anomabu. She arrived with them at Jamaica on 25 May. She had embarked 549 slaves, and arrived with 549. Union returned to England on 30 June.

==== Voyages for the EIC ====
In 1796 R. Owen became Union's master, and her trade changed to London—East Indies. That year Union was also rebuilt, and her burthen changed to 476 tons.

On 21 May 1796 Captain Richard Owen sailed Union from Portsmouth, bound for Bengal on a voyage for the EIC. Union reached Gibraltar on 14 June and the Cape of Good Hope on 19 September, and arrived at Calcutta on 2 March 1797. Homeward bound, she left Calcutta on 2 May, reached St Helena, and arrived at the Downs on 12 December.

Lloyd's Register continues to show Union, Owen, master, trading with India through 1804. However, on 30 July 1801, Captain John Luke sailed Union from Bengal, leaving Calcutta on 30 July. On 12 September she was at Saugor. She reached St Helena on 1 January 1802, and arrived at the Downs on 23 February. Then the Register of Shipping for 1802 shows Union, Hutchinson, master, Calvert, owner, trading between London and Liverpool.

== Fate ==
Neither Lloyd's Register nor the Register of Shipping lists Union in 1805.

== See also ==
- Gaspée Affair
