= Spanish ship Conquistador (1755) =

Ship of the line of the Spanish Navy

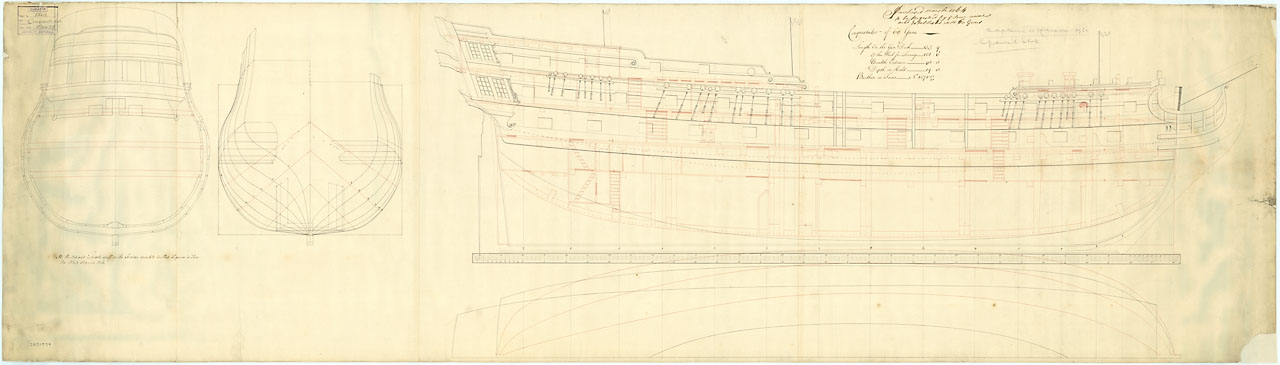
- Ship plan of Conquistador

History

Spain
- Name: Conquistador
- Launched: 20 July 1758
- Captured: 13 August 1762, by the Royal Navy

Great Britain
- Name: HMS Conquestador
- Acquired: 13 August 1762
- Fate: Broken up, 23 September 1782

General characteristics
- Class & type: 60-gun fourth rate ship of the line
- Tons burthen: 1278 tons
- Length: 155 ft 9 in (47.5 m) (gundeck)
- Beam: 43 ft 3 in (13.2 m)
- Depth of hold: 19 ft 3 in (5.9 m)
- Propulsion: Sails
- Sail plan: Full-rigged ship
- Armament: 60 guns of various weights of shot

Conquistador was a 60-gun ship of the line of the Spanish Navy. Launched in 1758, she was captured by the Royal Navy on 13 August 1762, and commissioned as the fourth-rate HMS Conquestador. She was placed on harbour service in 1775, and broken up in 1782.

== See also ==
- List of ships captured in the 18th century
