= Bombardment of Algiers (1783) =

- Part of the Spanish-Algerian war (1775-1785)
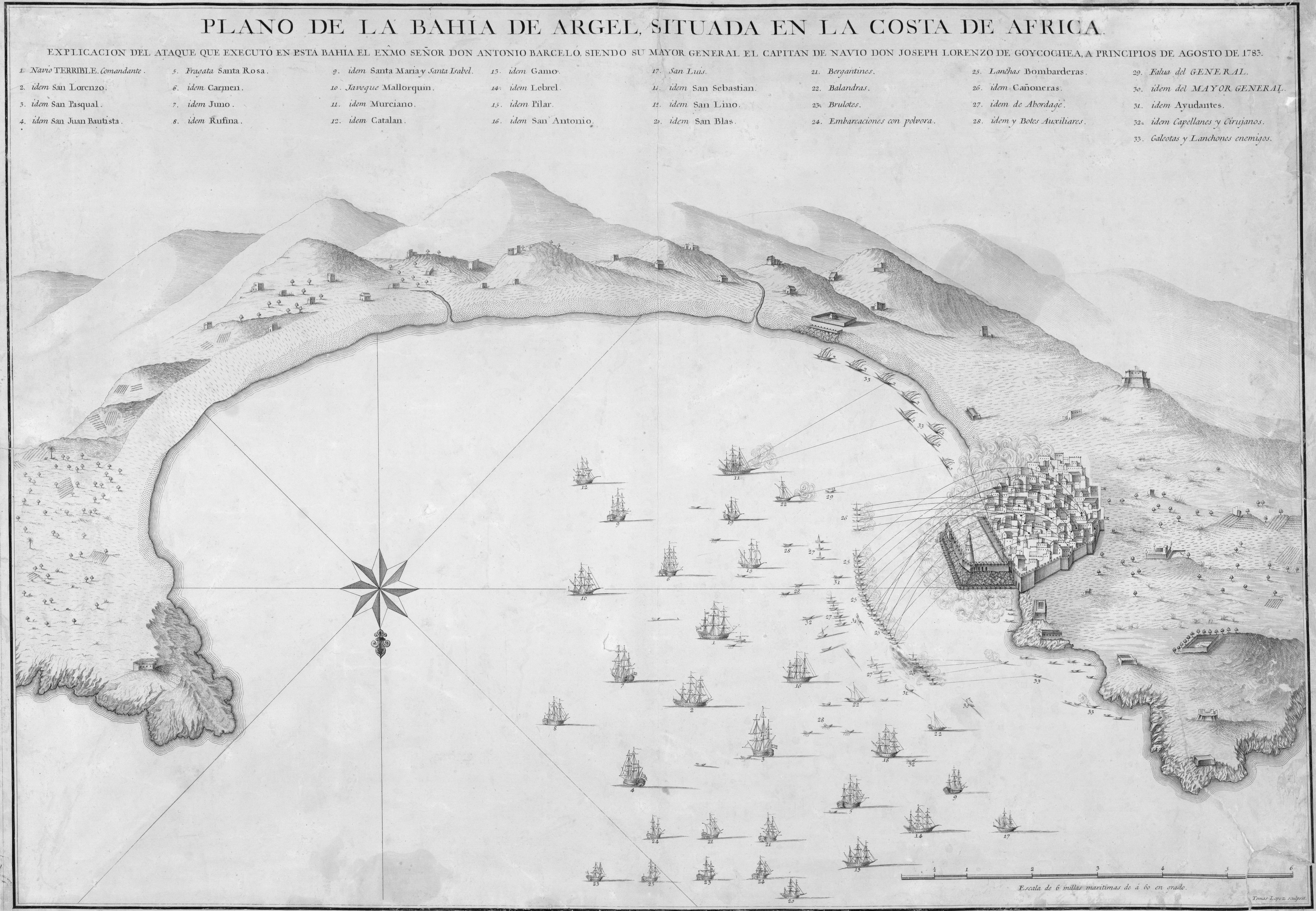
- Map of Algiers' Bombardment of 1783 by Antonio Barceló.
Date	4–8 August 1783
Location	Algiers
Result	Algerian victory

Belligerents
Spain	Regency of Algiers

Commanders and leaders
(Spain) Antonio Barceló	Mohammed V

Strength
4 ships of line, 4 frigates, 68 other ships	2 demi-galleys, 2 xebecs, 6 gunboats, 1 felucca

Casualties and losses
26 dead 1500 lb gunpowder stolen	1 gunboat 562 buildings destroyed or damaged

The Bombardment of Algiers in August 1783 was a failed attempt by Spain to put an end to Algerine privateering against Spanish shipping. A Spanish fleet of 70, sailing under Rear Admiral Antonio Barceló, bombarded the city eight times between August 4–8 but inflicted only minor damages to the Algerine military. Both Spaniards and Algerines fought poorly, but Barceló, blaming unfavorable weather conditions, gave the order to withdraw. His expedition was judged a failure at the Spanish court, being described as a "festival of fireworks too costly and long for how little it entertained the Moors and how it was used by whomever paid for it".

== Background ==
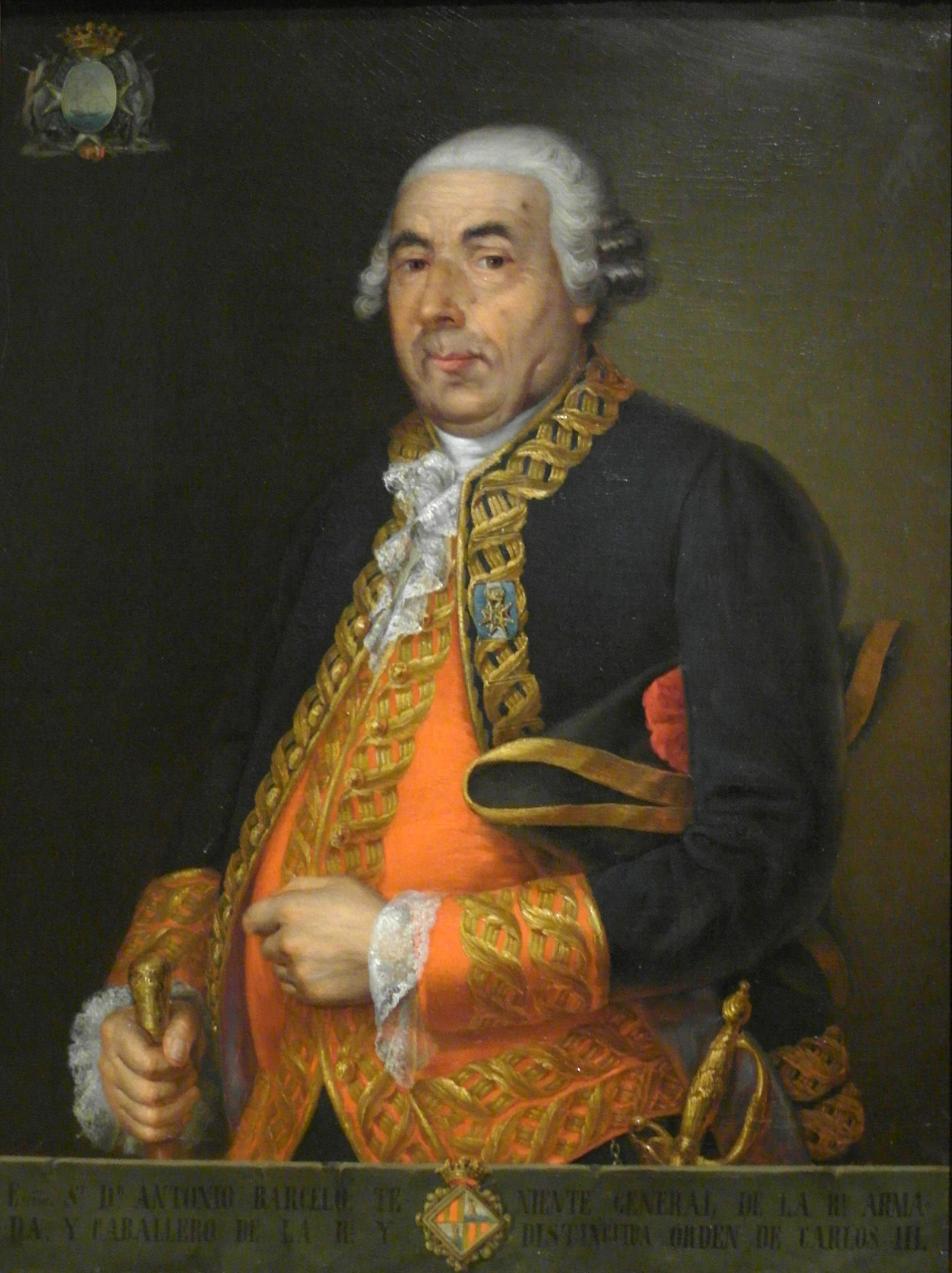
Portrait of Antonio Barceló. 1848 copy from an 18th-century original that was at Palma de Mallorca's Town Hall.

In 1775, a Spanish fleet of 51 ships under Don Pedro de Castejón escorted a landing force of 20,000 infantry, 800 cavalry, and 900 artillerymen in 450 transports against the most persistent of the Barbary raiders, the city of Algiers. The expedition of Count Alexander O'Reilly (an Irish soldier in the Spanish army) punished the Barbary port and inflicted 5,000 casualties on the Algerians, but took severe losses in return, amounting to 27 officers and about 500 enlisted men killed and 191 officers and over 2,000 enlisted men wounded.

The Algerine privateering against Spanish vessels increased following the disastrous invasion of Algiers in 1775. Spain tried to reach a peace agreement with the Ottoman Regency with the aim of securing their commercial traffic along the Mediterranean. Don Juan de Bouligny was sent to Constantinople in 1782 and managed to obtain a friendship and commercial agreement with Sultan Abdul Hamid I. The Regency, nevertheless, denied to accept the treaty. The Dey, influenced by several of his officers, the fasnachi, the treasurer, the focha, the Codgia of the cavalry and the Aga of the infantry, opted for war, ignoring the recommendations of his naval officers. The Spanish chief minister, the Count of Floridablanca, then tried in vain to bribe the Dey with gold to open negotiations for peace.

King Charles III, feeling that the national pride of Spain had been offended by the Algerines, resolved to punish them by bombarding their town. Rear admiral Antonio Barceló was appointed to carry out the attack. Though he was by far the most capable naval officer of Spain and one of the few who had risen through the ranks by merit, Barceló's designation was coldly received both by the Spanish court and military. The Rear admiral was old and illiterate and of humble extraction, which, together with his naval victories, earned him the envy of most of the senior Spanish officers.

== Bombardment ==
Barceló sailed from Cartagena on July 2 ahead of 4 ships of the line, 4 frigates and 68 small vessels, including gunboats and bomb vessels. The Algerines had no more than 2 demi-galleons of 5 guns each, a felucca of 6, two xebecs of 4 guns each, and 6 gunboats carrying 12 and 24-pounders to oppose them. On 29 July the Spanish fleet came in sight of the town and two days later Barceló formed his line of battle and made the necessary dispositions for the attack. The bomb-ketches and gunboats, supported by xebecs and other vessels, formed the vanguard, the whole being covered by the ships of line and frigates.

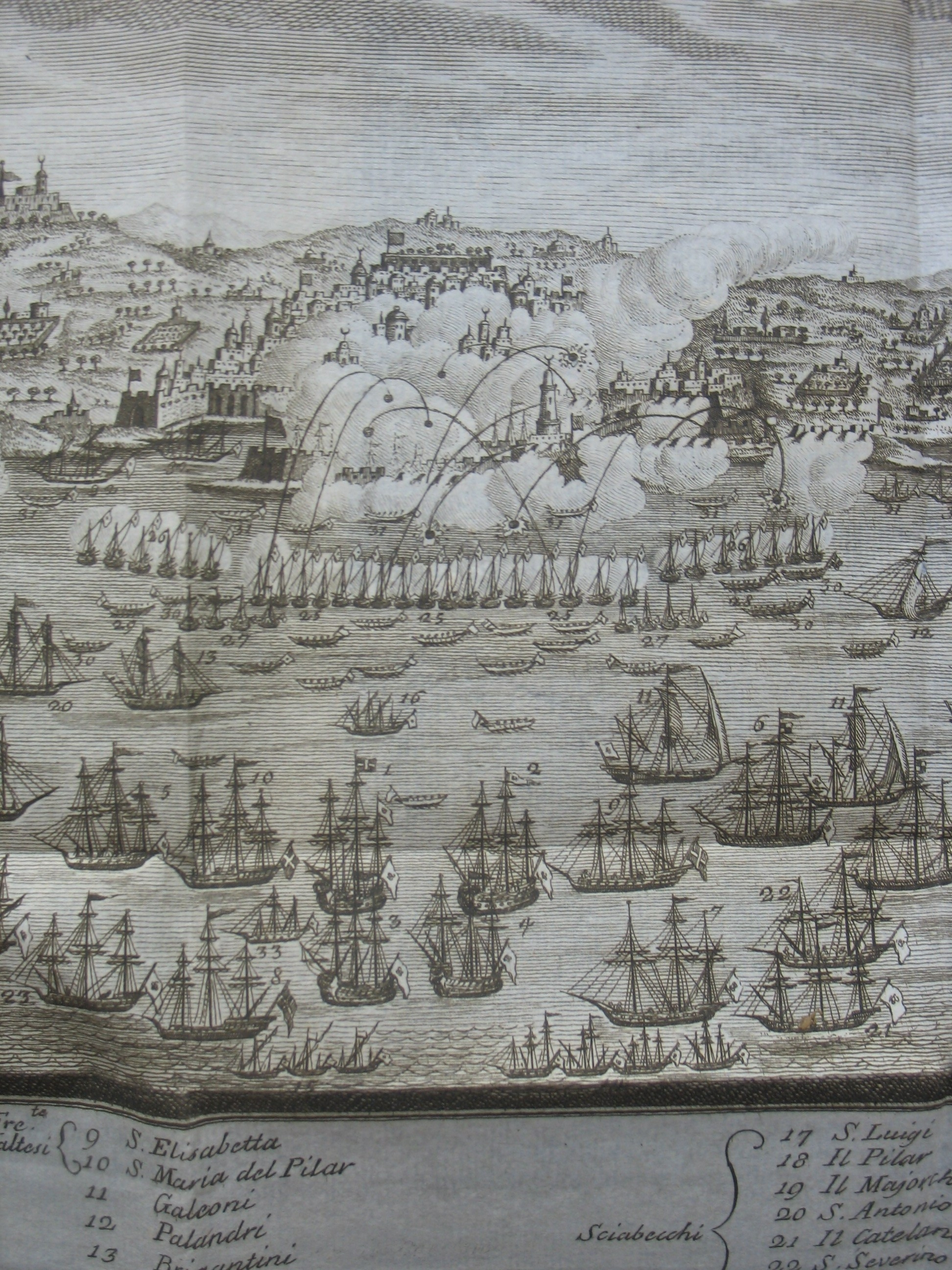
Excerpt of view of bombardment under Antonio Barceló.

The cannonade and bombardment commenced at 14:30, and continued without intermission till sunset. The attack was renewed on the following, and on every succeeding day until the 9th, when it was resolved at a council of war, for sufficient reasons, to return immediately to Spain. In the course of these attacks 3732 mortar shells and 3833 rounds of shot were discharged by the Spaniards, and the Algerines returned 399 mortar shells and 11,284 rounds of shot. This vast expenditure of ammunition produced no corresponding effect on either side: the town was repeatedly set on fire, but the flames were soon subdued.

Following the example of the Great Siege of Gibraltar, the garrison used red-hot balls, but they did not produce a similar effect. The Algerines made several bold sallies with their small vessels, but were constantly repulsed by the superiority of fire from the fleet. While the Dey had taken refuge at his citadel, the weight of the defense was sustained by an improvised militia composed mostly of teenagers. 25 Algerine heavy guns purchased in Denmark had blown up during the battle due to their misuse or bad conditions. In addition, 562 buildings were destroyed or damaged by the bombardment, an insignificant figure given that Algiers consisted of 5,000 buildings and that the whole town was exposed to the Spanish fire. Otherwise, only one gunboat was lost by the defenders. The Spanish casualties were also minimum: 26 killed and 14 wounded.

== Aftermath ==
According to the official version released by the Spanish government, the withdrawal was due to bad weather, an excuse not credible, given that the weather conditions in the Mediterranean are favorable to navigation in the summer. Among the measures used to present the bombing as a success, the most significant was that of numerous promotions among the participants. The Spanish 'victory' was sung by numerous poems, most of them exaggerated and of bad taste, but in fact nothing had been achieved. Two months later, five Algerian privateers captured two Spanish merchant vessels near Palamós as a gesture of defiance, and a new, far bigger expedition had to be assembled to attack Algiers again the following year.
