= Fuerzas sutiles =

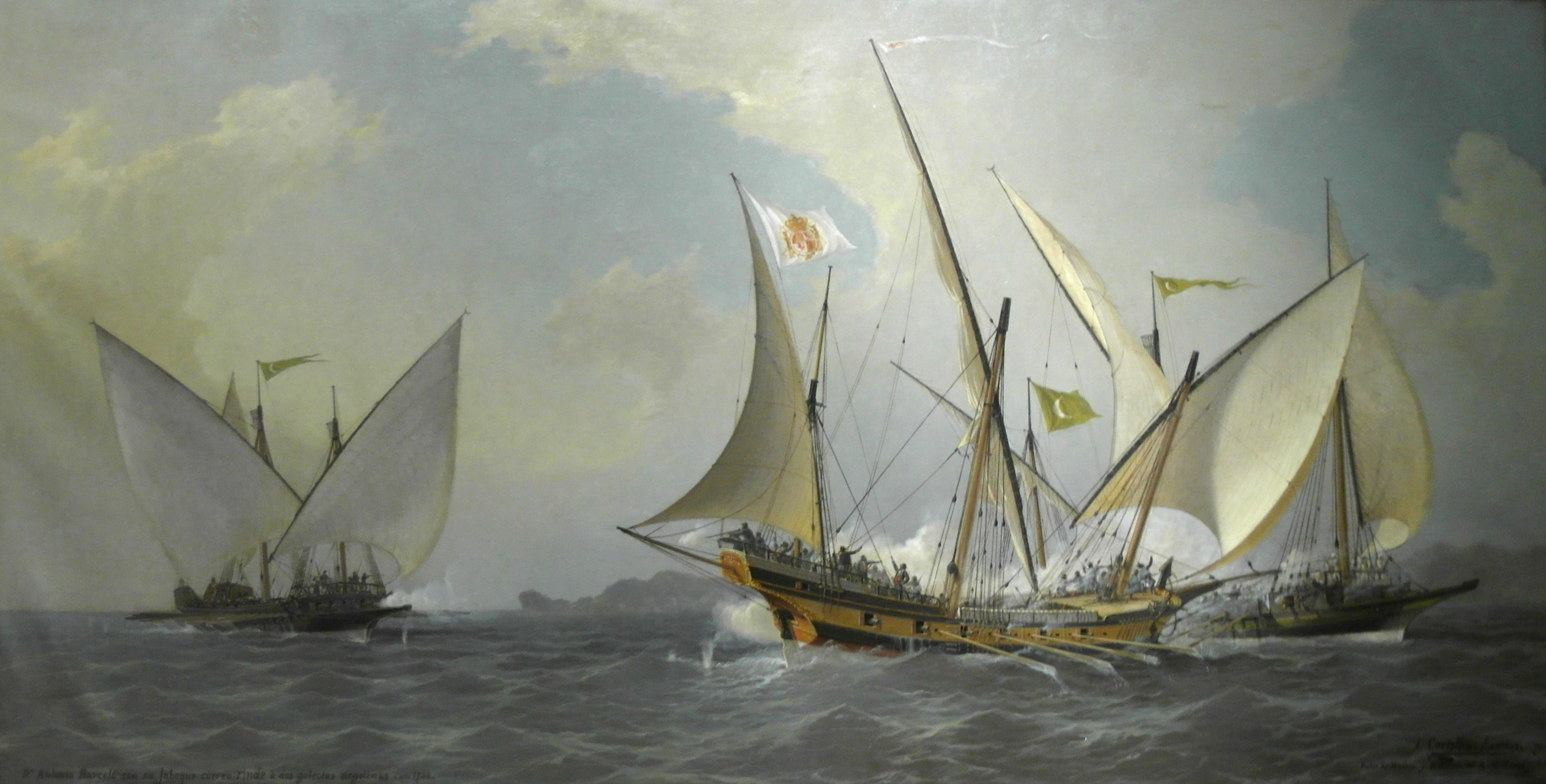
Antonio Barceló, con su jabeque correo, rechaza a dos galeotas argelinas (1738). Ángel Cortellini y Sánchez, 1902. Naval Museum of Madrid.

Fuerzas sutiles ("subtle forces") was an 18th century term, used in the Spanish Empire and its successor states, referring to the strategic usage of small vessels in naval warfare. This included gunboats, xebecs and armed feluccas, originally used to defend ports before being re-purposed to offensive tactics, escorting convoys and operating in seas and rivers.

The concept was popularized by captain Antonio Barceló, after which the Spanish Armada developed it extensively and with great efficacy, turning subtle forces into what has been described as "sea guerrillas". This kind of naval warfare would be known in France as flotilles a l’espagnole ("Spanish-style flotillas").

== Vessels and tactics ==
Traditional nomenclature in the Spanish Armada included four stages: buques de porte mayor ("major-sized ships" of over 34 guns, like ships of the line and frigates), buques de porte menor ("minor-sized ships" of 16 guns, like corvettes) and fuerzas sutiles (under 16 guns), complemented with the marina corsaria or privateers, including guarda costa. Subtle forces therefore covered a wide variety of vessels and boats, like gunboats, feluccas, xebecs, pontoons, barges, brigantines, fireships, skiffs, pataches, tartanes, zumacas and the increasingly rare galleys and galiots. Due to their small size, their number is often absent from historical records of battles or fleets, but they are conversely recorded to be an instrumental part of the Hispanic naval strategies.

Their main advantages were their speed, lightness, versatility and manoeuvrability, for which they mixed Lateen rigs with rowing and hulls of little draught, allowing them to move with little to no wind, go unnoticed easily and move through paths impassable for larger ships. They were characteristically equipped with a very prominent firepower for their size, with large caliber cannons and howitzers often employing incendiary ammunition. They were also sometimes armored, with recurved armor which along with its small size turned them extremely hard to hit by enemy artillery. The main disadvantage of subtle forces was their vulnerability to bad weather, which could make their usage dangerous or even impossible. In the late 19th century, they were sometimes fitted with steam engines.

Subtle forces were sometimes deployed from larger ships, and other times worked autonomously or were tied to land jurisdictions. They were predominantly used to protect supply lines, attacking bigger ships, conducting night combat and serving as mobile naval artillery.

== History ==
A possible precedent of the subtle forces is found in the treatise Civitates orbis terrarum by Georg Braun, whose illustration of the Ottoman conquest of Tunis shows Spaniards operating skiffs fitted with cannons in the lake of Tunis, forcing the Ottomans to take a detour.

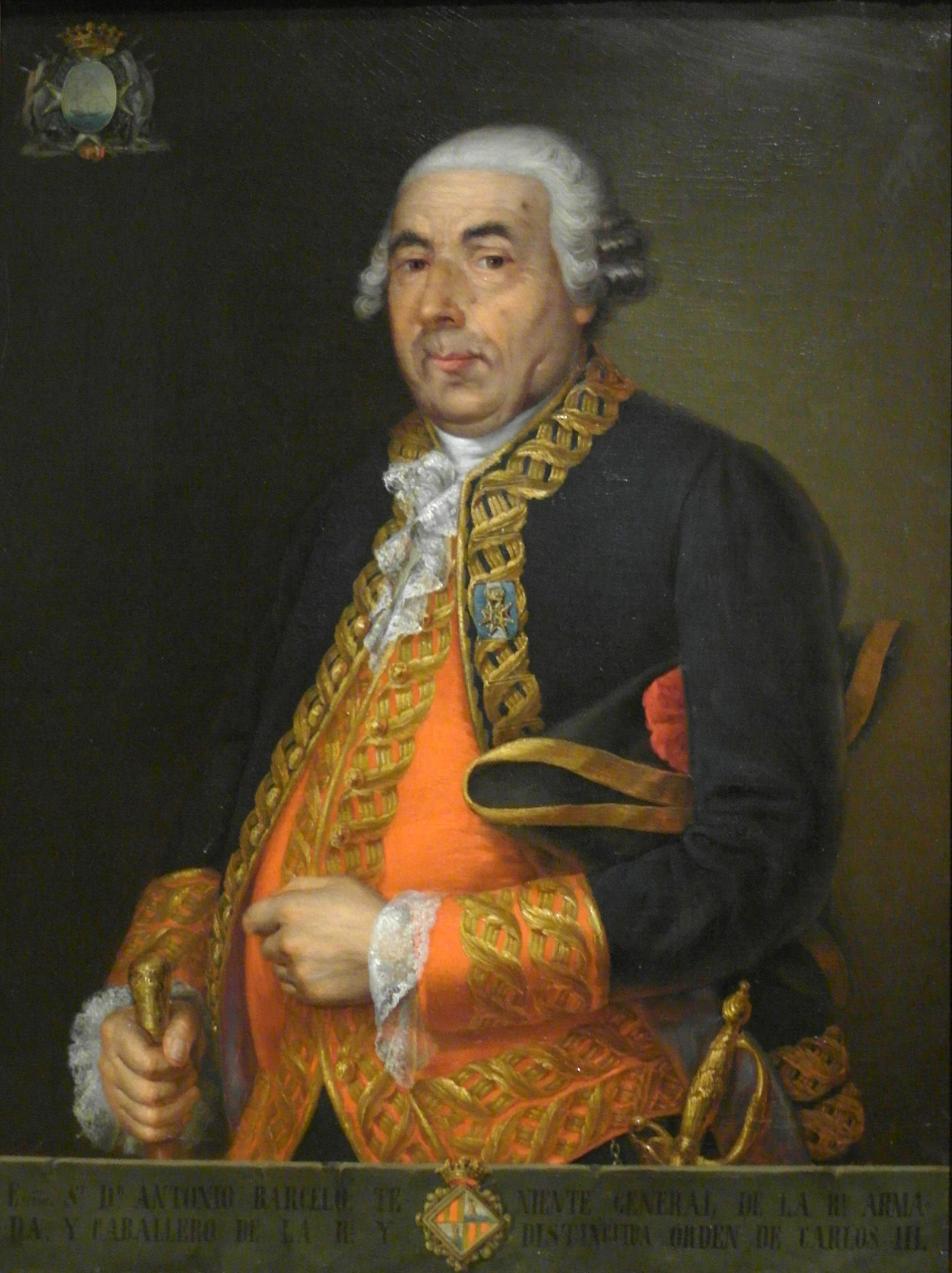
Portrait of Antonio Barceló, Naval Museum of Madrid.

The true rise of subtle forces comes with Antonio Barceló, who designed gunboats for their usage during the Great Siege of Gibraltar in 1779. His project entailed small boats with sails, rows and oversized artillery pieces, later adding armor too. The first batch featured 40 gunboats and 20 equipped with howitzers, which passed the rest of the siege entering and exiting the bay while bombarding the British positions, especially in night operations. They would become the most effective Spanish active in the otherwise ineffective siege, as recorded by chronicler Frederick Sayer. According to him, Spanish gunboats dealt constant, unanswered damage due to their size and number, as British artillerymen could not sight them by night and found out it was similarly useless to aim for their gun flashes.

His gunboats were used in combination with the elaborate, 80-gun floating batteries built by French engineer. Jean Le Michaud d'Arçon. The batteries turned out a fiasco due to their easy targets and inability to approach the coast with their big hulls, to the point that the gunboat division itself had to deploy to cover the retreat and abandonment of the batteries. Despite the siege's failure, the fuerzas sutiles proved their worth enough to be standardized by the Spanish Armada to future engagements, with the gunboats being officially labelled lanchas de fuerza ("force boats")

Barceló once again employed fuerzas sutiles to attack land-based positions during the Spanish-Algerian War, in which he led fleets that carried out punitive bombardments of the port of Algiers. Once again, the small size of the gunboats and bomb vessels proved decisive, allowing them to approach the port while making it difficult for the Algerian defenses to score hits against them. The second of Barceló's bombardments proved more challenging, as the Algerians deployed their own boats to counter them, but this did not stop the attack. They were used during the 1790 siege of Ceuta and its 1792 repeat, where subtle forces disrupted Moroccan supply, set fire to their batteries and neutralized several assault, ultimately making the sieges fail.

The most notable performance by Spanish gunboats occurred during the Napoleonic Wars, specifically during the 1797 attack on Cádiz, where Admiral José de Mazarredo deployed light naval forces to confront the fleet of his English counterpart, John Jervis. Mazarredo increased the caliber of the smaller craft and placed them under the command of Francisco de Moyna, with a roster of officers that included such renowned figures as Federico Gravina, Antonio de Escaño and Juan María de Villavicencio. The 167 vessels deployed repelled enemy attacks time and again, even though the British had countered by organizing their own divisions of gunboats commanded by Horatio Nelson.

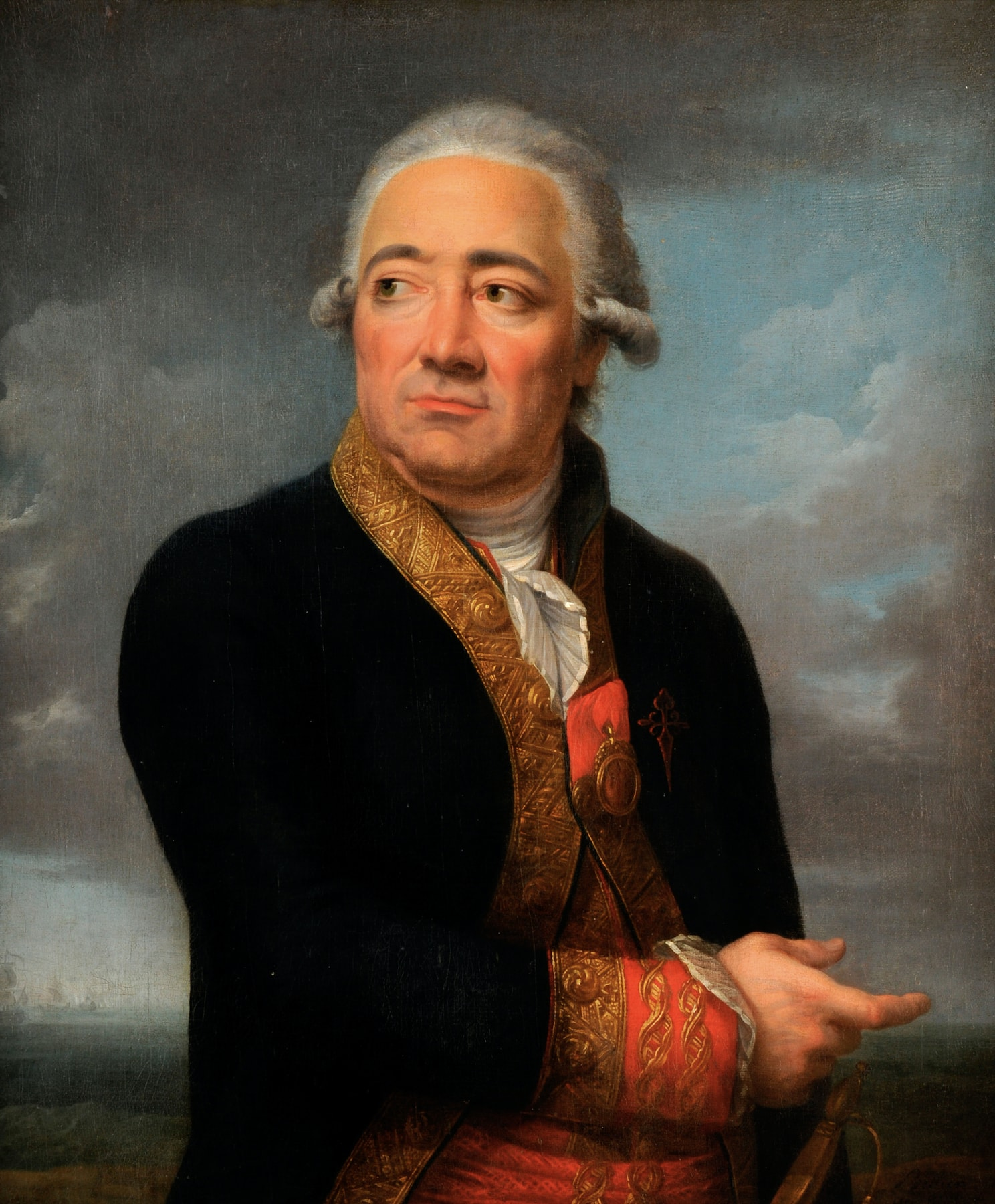
José de Mazarredo, Museo Naval de Madrid.

The blockade of Cádiz was lifted upon the arrival of the French fleet under Étienne Eustache Bruix. Subsequently, at the request of the French, Mazarredo combined his fleet with theirs to break another English blockade, this one at Brest, which had effectively thwarted a potential invasion of Ireland. Gravina and Antonio Miralles took charge of organizing local light naval forces to harass the English, succeededing again in besting their British counterparts and creating significant gaps in the siege. The renowned French admiral Louis-René Levassor de Latouche Tréville was impressed enough that he unsuccessfully proposed that the French Navy adopt the Spanish-style flotilla model. Disruptive operations were also carried out against the blockades of Boulogne, Calais and Roses, an effort that earned Miralles a promotion, following a renewed confrontation with Nelson. These light naval forces also contributed to the failure of the English siege of Puerto Rico and defended the estuary of Ferrol during the Battle of Brión.

They were also used to harass the French occupation during the Spanish War of Independence, hunting French privateers and working alongside British frigates. They served exceptionally in the siege of Cádiz, where squadrons of launches commanded by Cayetano Valdés, Francisco Mourelle and Juan de Dios Topete distinguished themselves, again defeating enemy launches that had been built to counter them. Viceroy Santiago de Liniers also used them in the Barragán cove.

With the arrival of the Hundred Thousand Sons of Saint Louis and the outbreak of the Spanish American wars of independence, all sides made use of fuerzas sutiles. Notable examples were those commanded by Jacinto de Romarate, Joaquín de la Pezuela, Pablo Morillo and Ángel Laborde. This practice continued during the Carlist Wars and the Hispano-Moroccan War of 1859, where such vessels penetrated the Martil river in Tétouan, securing a major Spanish victory. In the Philippines, these forces proved especially useful given the archipelago’s numerous islands and waterways, leading a corps of privateer-style light naval units to be formed there to repel local Muslim forces. In this theater, some smaller craft were eventually replaced by larger gunboats and schooners.

== Bibliography ==
- García-Torralba Pérez, Enrique (2019). Buques menores y fuerzas sutiles españolas, 1700-1850. Fondo Publisher Ingeniería Naval. ISBN 978-8493930370.
- Gella Iturriaga, José (1974). La Real Armada de 1808. Real Academia de la Historia. ISBN 9788440076823.
- Guimerá Ravina, Agustín; Blanco Núñez, José María (2008). Guerra naval en la Revolución y el Imperio: bloqueos y operaciones anfibias, 1793-1815. Marcial Pons. ISBN 9788496467804.
- Martínez-Valverde, C. (1992). Sobre las fuerzas navales sutiles españolas en los siglos XVIII y XIX. Revista de historia naval, ISSN 0212-467X, Año nº 10, Nº 36, 1992, págs. 31-54
- Ortega Martín, José (2009). La Transformación de Los Ejércitos Españoles (1975-2008). Universidad Nacional de Educación a Distancia. ISBN 9788436258349.
