= Spanish–Algerian War (1775–1785) =

- Part of the Spanish–Barbary wars
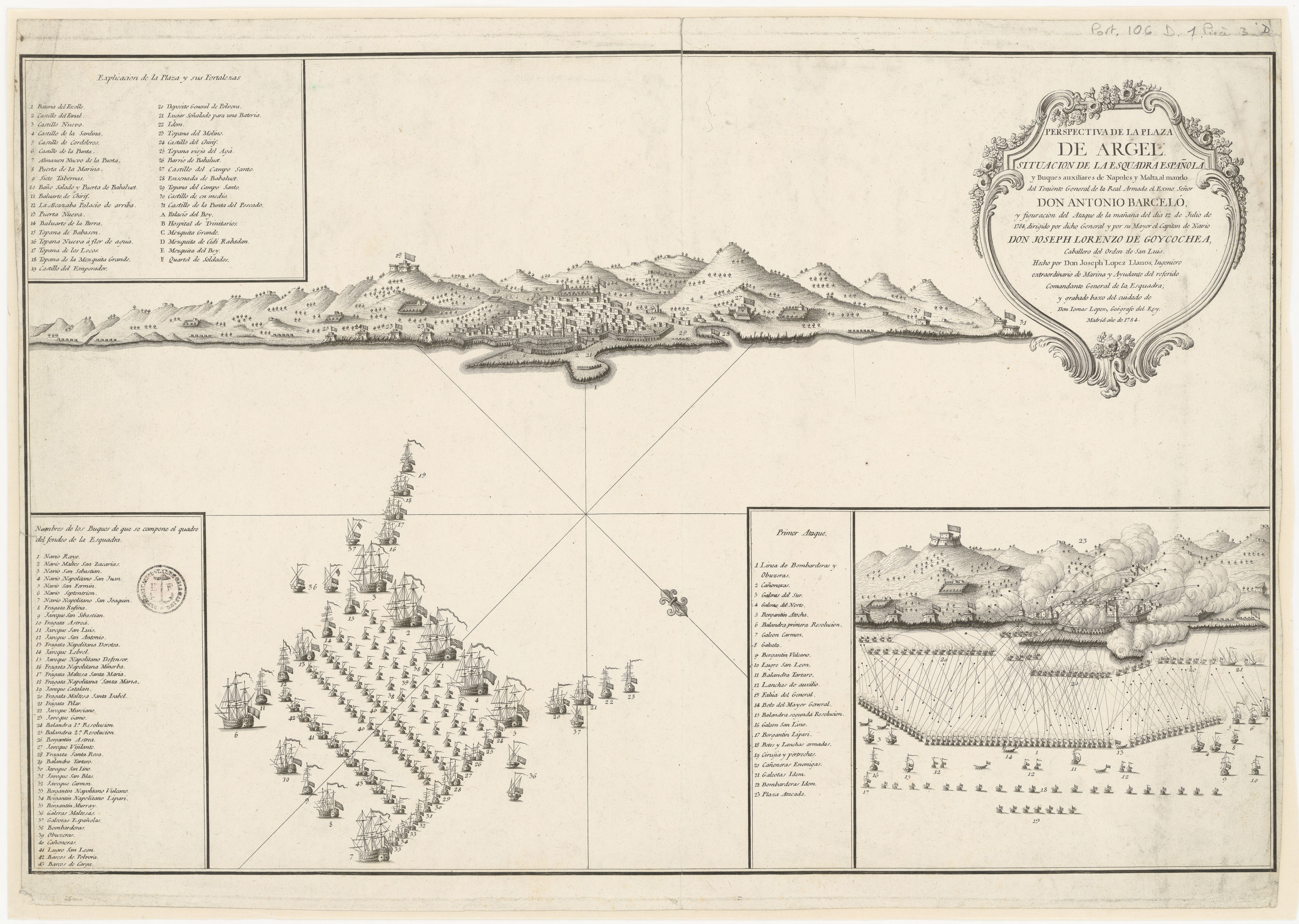
- Bombardment of Algiers (1784)
Date	1775–1785
Location	Algeria and the Mediterranean Sea
Result	Treaty of Algiers

Belligerents
Kingdom of Spain	Regency of Algiers

Commanders and leaders
Charles III; Alejandro O'Reilly; Antonio Barceló	Muhammad V

Strength
1775: 20,000 men 7 ships of the line 12 frigates 27 gunboats 5 hulks 9 feluccas 4 mortar boats 7 galleys 3 smaller warships 230 transports 1783: 76 ships 1784: 9 ships of the line 11 frigates 14 xebecs 90 smaller warships	Total: 4,000 Janissaries; 15,000 camelry 14,000 infantry 2 demi-galleys 2 xebecs 6 gunboats 1 felucca 70 galliots, gunboats, and other minor ships

Casualties and losses
528 dead (1775); 2,000 wounded	300 dead (1775); Unknown total deaths 65 galiots and gunboats destroyed

The Spanish–Algerian War was a conflict between the Spanish Empire and the Regency of Algiers from 1775 to 1785.

An attempted peace treaty in 1766 resulted only in an exchange of captives captured in Barbary corsair attacks. Spain officially declared war in 1775, launching an ill-fated invasion led by Alejandro O'Reilly that was repelled with significant losses. Algerian privateering increased post-invasion, and Spain's attempts at peace through diplomacy with despite the support of the Ottoman Empire.

Two separate bombardments of Algiers by Rear admiral Antonio Barceló in 1783 and 1784 inflicted limited damage, but succeeded to open negotiations. The war concluded in 1785 with a treaty that required Spain to pay 700,000 pesos in exchange for ending piracy against Spain, although hostilities would return a generation later.

== Background ==
Spain and Algeria were in a de facto constant state of conflict, ever since 1504, albeit war was rarely declared. Spain was especially incensed by this since Algerine pirates had been constantly harassing the Spanish coast for their slave hunting, Spain fought multiple wars with Algiers, but they were never able to end the local piracy once and for all. On top of that Spain recovered both Oran and Mers El Kébir, following their decisive victory in 1732. In 1766, some time after Baba Mohammed ben-Osman (also known as Muhammad V) was elected by the diwan of Algiers to be the Dey of Algiers, Spain attempted to sign a peace treaty with them, but that only ended in the exchange of captives in 1767, and 1768.

In 1775, after raids didn't stop, Spain de jure declared war, and in May, sent Alejandro O'Reilly to lead an expedition against Algiers.

== War ==
=== Invasion of Algiers (1775) ===
By June the task force that had been assembled was enormous, with seven ships of the line, twelve frigates, twenty-seven gunboats, five hulks, nine feluccas, four mortar boats, seven galleys and three smaller warships, along with two hundred and thirty transport ships. Twenty thousand soldiers, sailors and marines completed the complement and it set course from the port of Cartagena for Algiers, reaching its destination by the beginning of July. On the way, they joined forces with the small fleet of the Grand Duchy of Tuscany led by Tuscan admiral Sir John Acton. On July 5, the combined Spanish and Tuscan force reached Algiers, and O'Reilly made the decision to land troops to capture the city. The Spanish troops landed in two waves, but became deeply uncomfortable by the sweltering summer heat. Spanish admiral Antonio Barceló instructed his warships to protect the landing craft as they approached, but despite the bay's shallow water he stuck to the coast as close as possible to maximize the effectiveness of his ships. Despite the strict instructions that O'Reilly gave to his troops, the pilots of the landing craft mistakenly chose the wrong landing area and the artillery guns being transported on the landing craft became stuck fast in the dunes of the beach after being landed, making them totally unusable for combat. Once ashore, the Spanish were met initially with light Algerian resistance, mainly because a feigned retreat by the forces advancing from Algiers. The latter had been massively augmented by warrior tribesmen from the interior, who sent forces to Algiers after having been alerted by intelligence sent by Berber merchants in Marseille who had followed the course of Spanish military preparations during the spring of 1775.

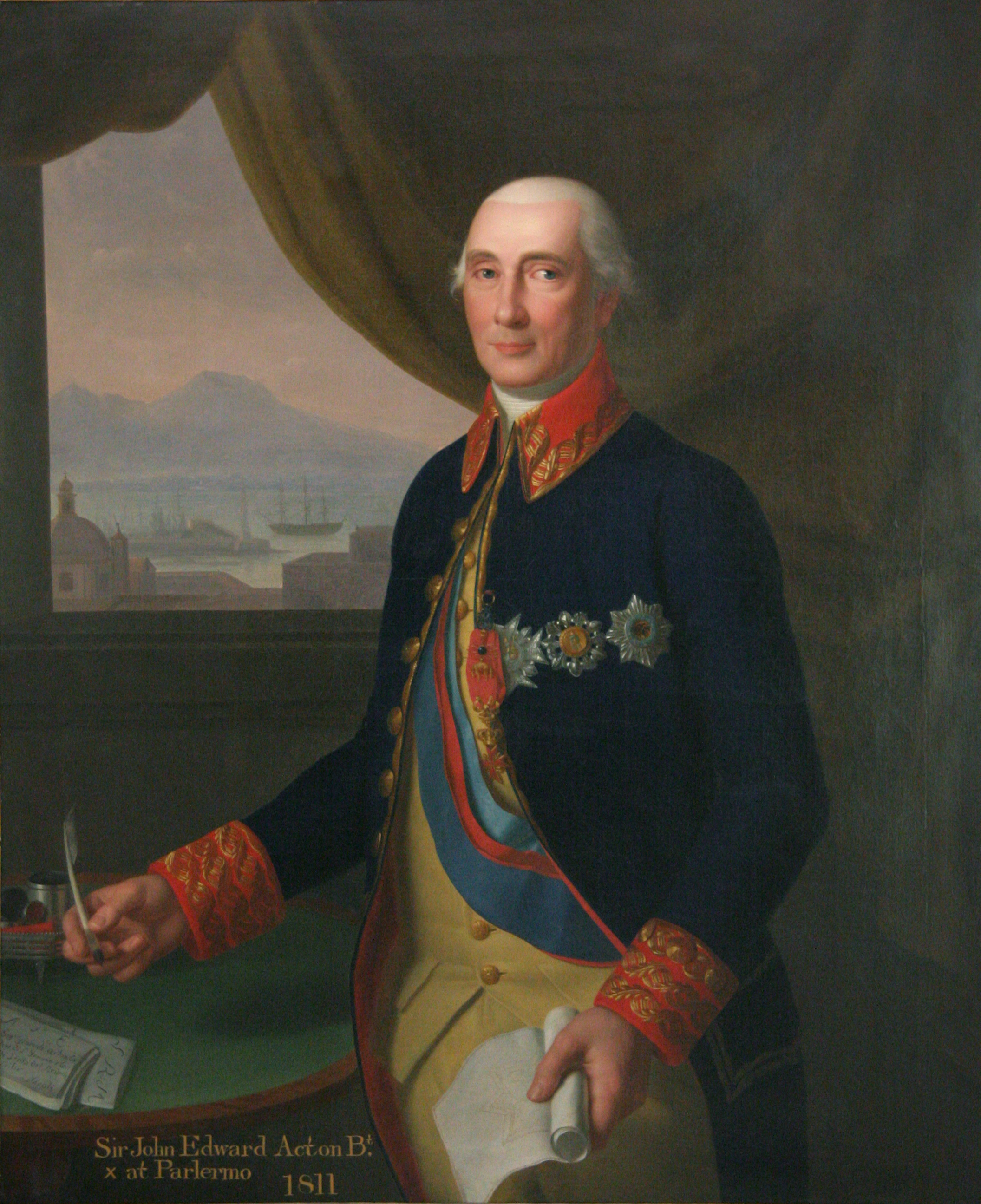
Portrait of Sir John Acton, attributed to Emanuele Napoli

The Spanish advanced forwards to engage the seemingly retreating Algerian forces, and moved further inland. However, the Algerians drew the Spanish into a specially chosen location where they could ambush and attack them from cover. By now the Spanish had realized the position they were in, at the same time the Algerians sprung their trap. However, by the time the Spanish realized they were surrounded, it was too late for them. Unable to hold an effective line of resistance, the Spanish forces were routed, returning in chaos to their ships. The losses were huge; suffering nearly 3,000 casualties, including five generals killed and fifteen wounded (with one of these being Bernado de Galvez), and abandoning to the Algerians no fewer than 15 artillery pieces and some 9000 other weapons. Henry Swinburne, a British travel writer wrote that the Spanish would have been "broken and slaughtered to a man... had not Mr. Acton, the Tuscan commander, cut his cables, and let his ships drive in to shore just as the enemy was coming on us full gallop. The incessant fire of his great guns, loaded with grape-shot, not only stopped them, but obliged them to retire with great loss." 2,000 Spaniards were captured as many were cut off from the boats that would have allowed them to return to their ships. O'Reilly had to wait for a month to negotiate their return. He then wanted to retaliate by bombarding Algiers from the sea, but he learned that he had only enough provisions on board to last for an immediate return to Spain. O'Reilly and the Spanish fleet withdrew to Alicante with his reputation now in tatters.

==== Aftermath ====
The Algerine privateering against Spanish vessels increased following the disastrous invasion of Algiers in 1775. Spain tried to reach a peace agreement with the Ottoman Regency with the aim of securing their commercial traffic along the Mediterranean. Don Juan de Bouligny was sent to Constantinople in 1782 and managed to obtain an agreement of friendship and trade with Sultan Abdul Hamid I. The Regency, nevertheless, refused to accept the treaty. The Dey, influenced by several of his officers, the fasnachi, the treasurer, the focha, the Codgia of the cavalry and the Aga of the infantry, opted for war, ignoring the recommendations of his naval officers. The Spanish chief minister, the Count of Floridablanca, then tried in vain to bribe the Dey with gold to open negotiations for peace.

King Charles III, feeling that the national pride of Spain had been offended by the Algerines, resolved to punish them by bombarding their town. Rear admiral Antonio Barceló was appointed to carry out the attack. Though he was by far the most capable naval officer of Spain and one of the few who had risen through the ranks by merit, Barceló's designation was coldly received both by the Spanish court and military. The Rear admiral was old and illiterate and of humble extraction, which, together with his naval victories, earned him the envy of most of the senior Spanish officers.

=== Bombardment of Algiers (1783) ===
Barceló sailed from Cartagena on July 3 ahead of 5 ships of the line, 4 frigates and 68 small vessels, including gunboats and bomb vessels. The Algerines had no more than 2 demi-galleons of 5 guns each, a felucca of 6, two xebecs of 4 guns each, and 6 gunboats carrying 12 and 24-pounders to oppose them. On 29 July the Spanish fleet came in sight of the town and two days later Barceló formed his line of battle and made the necessary dispositions for the attack. The bomb-ketches and gunboats, supported by xebecs and other vessels, formed the vanguard, the whole being covered by the ships of line and frigates.

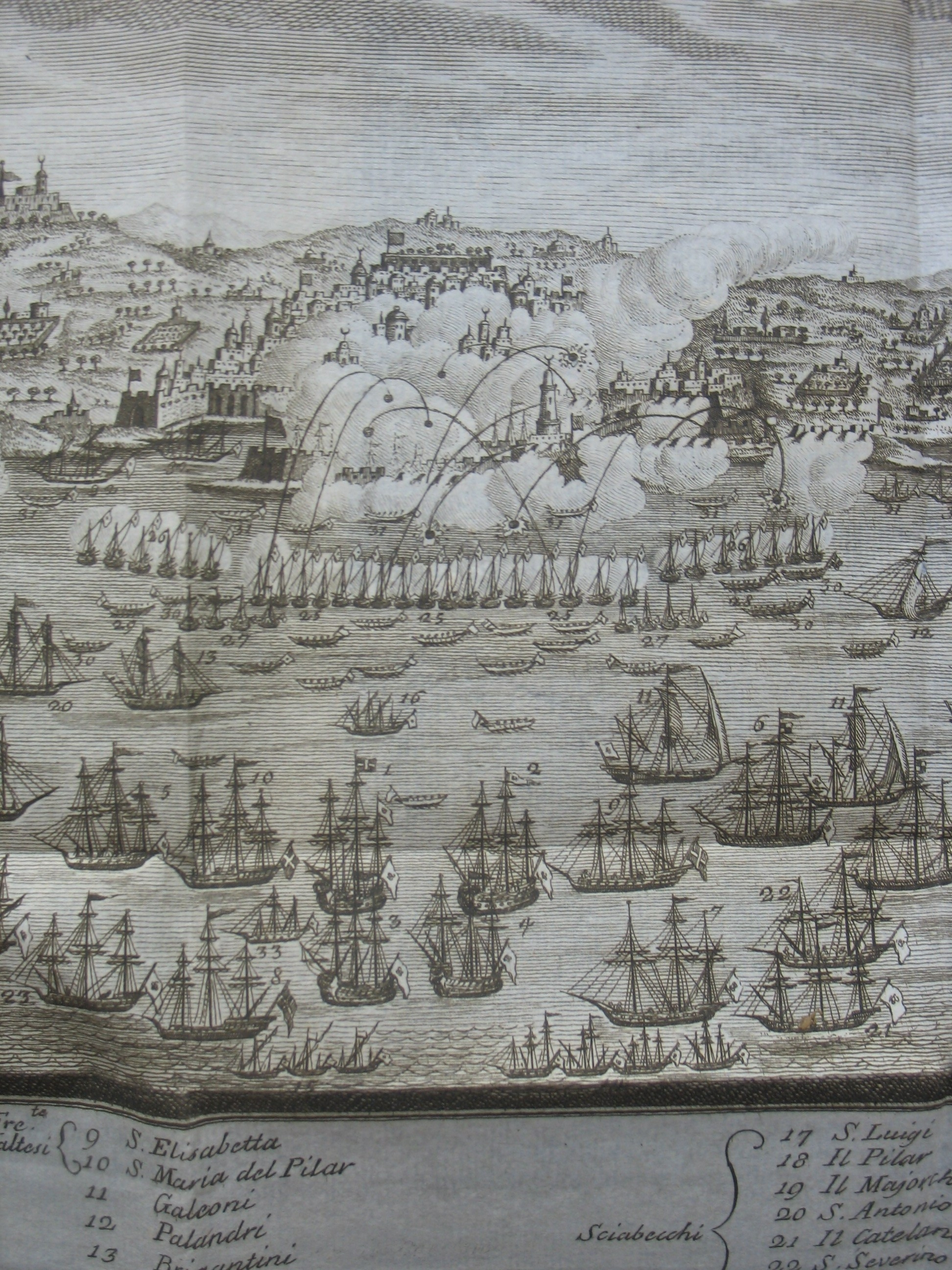
Excerpt of view of bombardment under Antonio Barceló

The cannonade and bombardment commenced at 14:30 and continued without intermission till sunset. The attack was renewed on the following, and on every succeeding day until the 9th, when it was resolved at a council of war, for sufficient reasons, to return immediately to Spain. In the course of these attacks 3732 mortar shells and 3833 rounds of shot were discharged by the Spaniards, and the Algerines returned 399 mortar shells and 11,284 rounds of shot. This vast expenditure of ammunition produced no corresponding effect on either side: the town was repeatedly set on fire, but the flames were soon subdued.

Following the example of the Great Siege of Gibraltar, the garrison used red-hot balls, but they did not produce a similar effect. The Algerines made several bold sallies with their small vessels, but were constantly repulsed by the superiority of fire from the fleet. While the Dey had taken refuge at his citadel, the weight of the defense was sustained by an improvised militia composed mostly of teenagers. 25 Algerine heavy guns purchased in Denmark had blown up during the battle due to their misuse or bad conditions. In addition, 562 buildings were destroyed or damaged by the bombardment, an insignificant figure given that Algiers consisted of 5,000 buildings and that the whole town was exposed to the Spanish fire. Otherwise, only one gunboat was lost by the defenders. The Spanish casualties were also minimum: 26 killed and 14 wounded.

=== Bombardment of Algiers (1784) ===
Due to the Anglo-Spanish War of 1779-1783, in which Spain intervened on the side of the United States, further actions against Algiers had to wait. Meanwhile, Spain offered Algiers a commercial agreement in exchange for ending Barbary privateering, but the Regency refused claiming obedience to the Sultan of the Ottoman Empire. Spanish diplomat Juan de Bouligny took matters to Constantinople in December 1782, signing a treaty with Sultan Abdul Hamid I, but again Algiers refused to acknowledge it.

In Cartagena, Barceló had finished preparations for a new expedition. His fleet consisted of four 80-gun ships of line, four frigates, 12 xebecs, 3 brigs, 9 small vessels, and an attacking force of 24 gunboats armed with pieces of 24 pounds, 8 more with 18 pounds' pieces, 7 lightly armed to board the Algerian vessels, 24 armed with mortars, and 8 bomb vessels with 8 pound pieces. The expedition was financed by Pope Pius VI and supported by the Navy of the Kingdom of the Two Sicilies, which provided two ships of the line, three frigates, two brigs and two xebecs under Admiral Bologna, by the Order of Malta, which provided a ship of line, two frigates and five galleys, and by that of Portugal, which provided two ships of line and two frigates under Admiral Ramires Esquível. These last joined the allied fleet later and arrived in the middle of the bombardment.

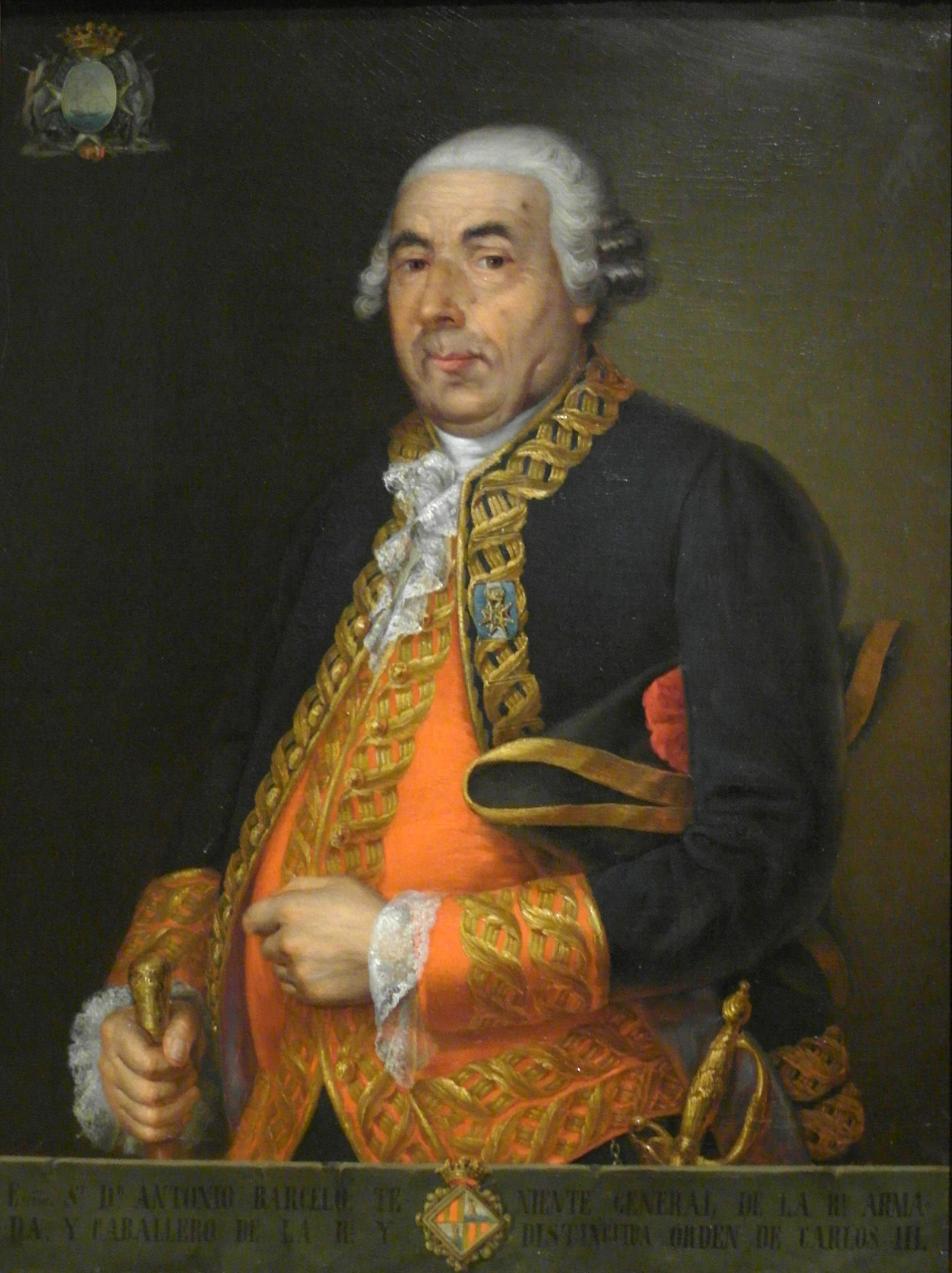
Portrait of Antonio Barceló. 1848 copy from an 18th-century original that was at Palma de Mallorca's Town Hall

On 28 June, having entrusted itself to the Virgen del Carmen, the Allied fleet sailed from Cartagena, arriving off Algiers on 10 July. Two days later at 8:30 AM, the bombardment began with the Spanish ships opening fire. It was kept up until 4:20 PM, during which time about 600 bombs, 1,440 cannonballs and 260 shells were fired over the city, compared to 202 bombs and 1,164 cannonballs fired by the Algerians. Major damage to the city and its fortifications and a large fire were observed. An attack by light vessels of the Algerian fleet, composed of 67 ships, was repulsed, four of them being destroyed. The Allied casualties were minimal: 6 killed and 9 wounded, most of them due to accidents with the fuses of the bombs. Gunboat No. 27, commanded by the Neapolitan ensign José Rodríguez, exploded accidentally, killing 25 sailors.

=== Peace treaty ===
Although the Algerians boasted that the city's damage was less valuable than the ammunition fired, the Dey finally opened to negotiations in 1785, alerted by a third bombardment being in the works and the promise of bombarding Algiers every year until they became willing to negotiate. The bombardments had already convinced the Ottoman Tripolitania to sign a peace treaty with Spain in 1784. Spanish prime minister Floridablanca sent an embassy composed by French diplomat Count de Expilly and captain José de Mazarredo at the head of two ships of the line and two frigates. King Charles III advised John VI of Portugal to send their own negotiatiors to the fleet, who included Jacques Philippe de Landerset and Friar João de Sousa.

Negotiations dragged on, as Expilly and Mazarredo initially ceded to several demands, including paying a million pesos to the Dey of Algiers. Floridablanca refused and instructed Expilly, who had the biggest clout in the embassy, to renegotiate the agreement. Eventually, a peacy treaty was signed on June 14, 1786, putting an end to Barbary privateering against Spain and allowing a Spanish consulate in Algiers along with toleration of Catholicism in the city, in exchange for a final payment of 700,000 pesos. The Portuguese failed to obtain their own treaty due to Abdul Hamid I's refusal to entertain peace with them. A new complication emerged afterwards, when it was found out Expilly had surreptitiously made the sides sign two different treaties, which had to be sorted out with new negotiations. Except by some alterations in relation to the Spanish possession of Oran, the final treatise was left according to the Spanish version, after which Expilly was expelled from Algiers, where it was discovered he had also embezzled several diplomatic gifts.

== Aftermath ==
The treaty met objections in Spain due to the monetary investment, not to mention the text did not include allies like Naples, Sardinia, Portugal and the Papal States, but its outcome was ultimately positive for Spanish interests. The head of Tunis similarly stepped up to sign their own treaty with Spain ratifying the Bouligny agreement in 1791.

For the first time in centuries, Spain found itself free from being a target of the Barbary slave trade, which led to the extensive development of villages and crops in the Mediterranean coast, previously deterred from exploiting due to the attacks of Barbary corsairs. In order to honor the conclusion of the conflict and open trade, Floridablanca sent a diplomatic fleet to Constantinople. However, Barbary attacks would return during the unstability of the Napoleonic Wars, until eventually disappearing with the French conquest of Algeria.

== Bibliography ==
- Asensio Bernalte, José Ángel (1984). "Incidencias corsarias en las costas catalanas durante en reinado de Carlos III (1756-1788), según la "Gazeta" de Madrid". Primer Congrés d'Història Moderna de Catalunya. Vol. 1. Universidad de Barcelona. pp. 721–730. ISBN 84-75281-53-2.
- Conrotte, Manuel; Corrales, Eloy Martín (2006). España y los países musulmanes durante el ministerio de Floridablanca (in Spanish). Spain: Editorial Renacimiento. ISBN 84-96133-57-5.
- Cust, Edward (1859). España Annals of the wars of the eighteenth century, compiled from the most authentic histories of the period: 1783-1795. London: Mitchell's Military Library.
- Fernández Duro, Cesáreo (1902). Armada española desde la unión de los reinos de Castilla y de León. Vol VII (in Spanish). Madrid: Sucesores de Rivadeneyra.
- Latino Coello, Jose Maria (1885). Historia politica e militar de Portugal desde os fins do XVIII seculo até 1814, tomo 2 (in Portuguese). Biblioteca Nacional de Austria.
- Losada Malvárez, Juan Carlos (2021). España contra el Imperio otomano: la lucha por el control del Mediterráneo desde el siglo XVI al XVIII. La Esfera de los Libros. ISBN 9788413841472.
- Moya Sordo, Vera (2025). Reyes del corso. Desperta Ferro Ediciones. ISBN 978-84-1298-466-8.
- Pinkerton, John (1809). A general collection of the best and most interesting voyages and travels in all parts of the world: many of which are now first translated into English; digested on a new plan. London: Longman, Hurst, Rees, and Orme. "algiers barceló."
- Rodríguez González, Agustín (2005). Trafalgar y el conflicto naval anglo-español del Siglo XVIII. Actas Publisher. ISBN 84-9739-052-0.
- Sánchez Doncel, Gregorio (1991). Presencia de España en Orán (1509-1792) (in Spanish). Toledo: I.T. San Ildefonso. ISBN 978-84-600-7614-8.
- San Juan Sánchez, Víctor (2019). Breve historia de las batallas navales de las fragatas. Nowtilus. ISBN 978-8413050768.
- Trigo Chacón, Manuel (2008). Los estados y las relaciones internacionales. Vol. 1. Publisher Visión Libros. ISBN 978-84-9886-332-1.
