= Antonio de Escaño =

Spanish Navy officer and politician (1750–1814)

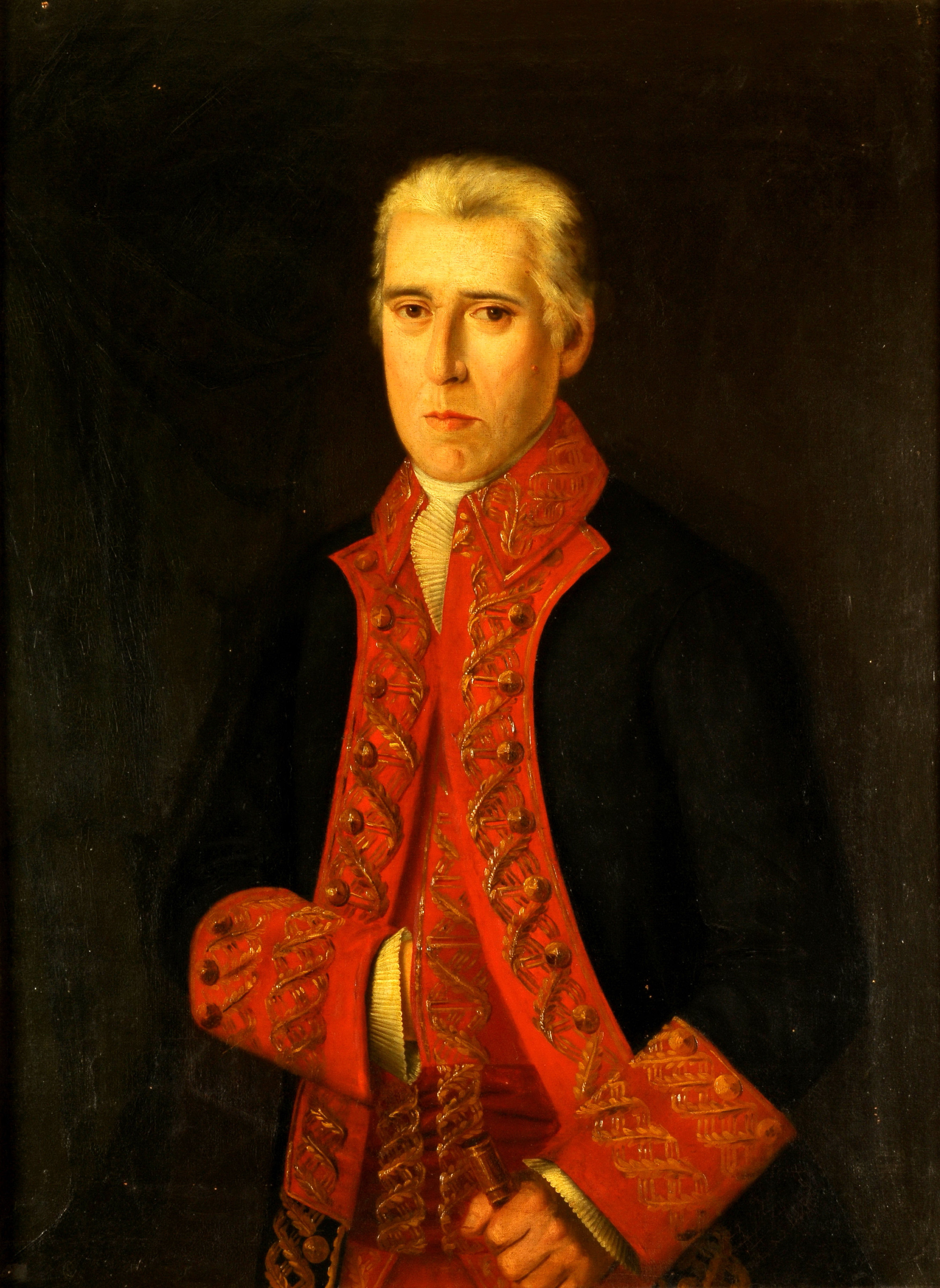
- 1850 portrait of de Escaño by José Sánchez
- Born: 1750; Cartagena, Spain
- Died: 12 July 1814 (aged 63–64); Cádiz, Spain
- Military career
- Allegiance: Spanish Navy
- Branch: Spanish Navy
- Service years: 1767–1810
- Rank: Lieutenant general
- Units: Second in command of Spanish fleet: Battle of Cape Finisterre (1805); Battle of Trafalgar (1805) (acting commander during battle)
- Commands: Commanding Officer of ships of the line: San Fulgencia 60 guns; San Ildefonso 74 guns; Principe de Asturias 112 guns
- Conflicts: American Revolutionary War; Battle of Cape Spartel; Bombardment of Algiers (1783); French Revolutionary Wars; Battle of Cape St. Vincent (1797); Assault on Cádiz (1797); Napoleonic Wars; Battle of Cape Finisterre (1805); Battle of Trafalgar

Lieutenant-General Antonio de Escaño y García de Cáceres (1750 – 12 July 1814) was a Spanish Navy officer and politician. He served in several naval battles including the Battle of Trafalgar. He was Spain's Minister of the Navy and a member of the Council of Regency. A Spanish Navy school named for him states: "He is regarded as one of the best naval tacticians of the 18th century. An enlightened man, he devoted himself to the study of shipbuilding and other academic disciplines such as chemistry, botany and history, of which he was an academic."

== Biography ==
=== Early career ===
Escaño became a midshipman at the age of 17 and took part in almost every major Spanish naval operation of his time. These included the 1782 Battle of Cape Spartel, an indecisive naval battle between a British fleet under Admiral Richard Howe and a Franco-Spanish fleet under Spanish Admiral Luis de Córdova y Córdova, an expedition against Algiers in 1783 and the Battle of Cape St. Vincent in 1797.

At the Battle of Cape St. Vincent, thanks to his military perceptiveness while in command of the Príncipe de Asturias he helped to save the Spanish flagship Nuestra Señora de la Santísima Trinidad, when Spanish Admiral José de Córdoba y Ramos lost control over the situation while under attack by British Commodore Horatio Nelson. For this, Escaño was rewarded with the Order of Santiago.

He then took part in successfully resisting the assault on Cádiz by a British fleet under Admiral John Jervis and Nelson, by now a rear admiral. Escaño later served during the Battle of Cape Finisterre when a British fleet under Admiral Robert Calder defeated a Franco-Spanish fleet under French Vice-admiral Pierre-Charles de Villeneuve as it was returning from the West Indies, though the battle was ultimately strategically inconclusive.

=== Trafalgar ===
Due to his military and nautical experience, and as the second in command of the Spanish ships under Federico Gravina, Escaño was appointed to speak for the Spanish captains at a meeting on the French flagship Bucentaure. It was his opinion that it would be best to remain within the Bay of Cádiz and not try to breakout of the British naval blockade, which had been reinforced by Nelson. This was contrary to Napoleon's orders to Villeneuve, who ignored this advice and ordered the Franco-Spanish fleet to sail out against Nelson and his ships.

Escaño was temporarily the acting commander of the Spanish ships due to Gravina being severely wounded during the Battle of Trafalgar (both were on the Spanish flagship Príncipe de Asturias, one of the few ships to not surrender and make it back to Cádiz). Despite having been wounded himself during the battle, Escaño communicated to Spanish Prime Minister Manuel Godoy the results of the battle since "the situation in which Lieutenant General Don Federico Gravina finds himself, as a result of a shrapnel bullet that at the end of yesterday's action he received in his left arm, does not allow him to give V.E. (His Excellency) news of this bloody combat".

=== Later life ===
Escaño was promoted to lieutenant general of the Navy and was the Minister of the Navy between 1808 and 1810. In 1810 he was elected to be a member of the Council of Regency of Spain and the Indies. When this body resigned after the convening of the Cortes of Cádiz, he was the only member who was authorized to continue to reside in the city and became a member of the Cortes which developed the Spanish Constitution of 1812. Escaño was appointed captain general of Cartagena in 1814, a position he did not assume because he died a few days later.

== Legacy ==
There is a Spanish Navy school that bears his name: Escuela de Especialidades (School of Specialties) "Antonio de Escaño", located in Ferrol, Spain. The major areas of expertise are Telecommunications Systems, Weapons Systems, and Power and Propulsion Systems.

Government offices
Preceded by Francisco Gil de Lemos	Ministerio de Marina de España (Minister of the Navy of Spain); 1808-1810	Succeeded by Gabriel Císcar
