= Antonio Barceló =

Spanish Navy officer (1717–1797)

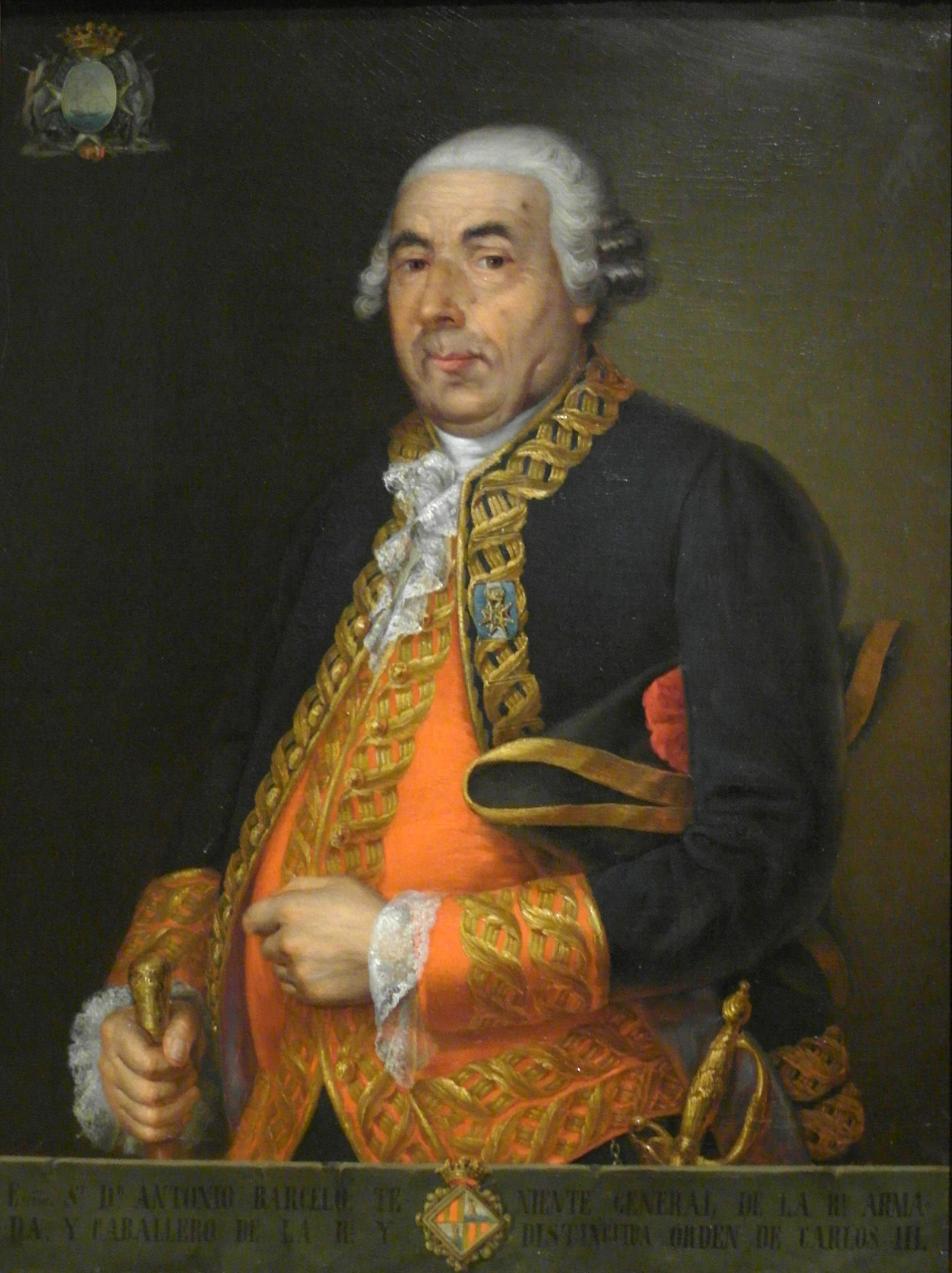
- 1848 portrait
- Born: 1 January 1717; Palma, Majorca
- Died: 30 January 1797 (aged 80); Palma, Majorca
- Military career
- Allegiance: Spain
- Branch: Spanish Navy
- Service years: 1738–1792
- Rank: Lieutenant general
- Commands: Mediterranean expeditionary fleets
- Conflicts: Spanish conquest of Oran (1732); Invasion of Algiers (1775); American Revolutionary War; Great Siege of Gibraltar; Bombardment of Algiers (1783); Bombardment of Algiers (1784)

Lieutenant-General Antonio Barceló y Pont de la Terra (1 January 1717 – 30 January 1797) was a Spanish Navy officer. Born into humble origins, Barceló rose to admiral on military merits alone, an unusual event at his time. He fought against Barbary corsairs in the western Mediterranean, adopting their tactics to counter them and serving himself as a corsair hunter for most of his career. He later extensively developed the Spanish usage of naval artillery and gunboats, leading to the creation of the fuerzas sutiles.

== Biography ==
He was the oldest of the five sons of Onofre Barceló, a small time privateer against the Muslim piracy that attacked the coasts of the western Mediterranean. Antonio started his career as a cabin boy in Onofre's xebec Santo Cristo de Santa Margarita, eventually replacing Onofre as its captain, and added a job as a royal mail ship between Palma de Mallorca and Barcelona.

With the Spanish Navy focused on the War of Jenkins' Ear since 1739, Barceló and other privateers were recruited and received the official mission to prevent further piracy. Eventually he became lieutenant general of the Spanish Navy.

He is also famous for his bombardments of Algiers (Bombardment of Algiers in August 1783 and 2nd Bombardment of Algiers in July 1784) and use of gunboats during the Great Siege of Gibraltar.

Antonio is also credited with putting sailors and ships under the patronage of the Virgin of Carmel and shifting away from the patronage of St. Elmo. Today, on the feast day of the Viring of Carmel, blessing of boats still takes place in many Spanish towns.
