= Juan de Bouligny =

Spanish ambassador to the Ottoman Empire (1726–1798)

- Born: Juan Ventura Bouligny y Paret; March 3, 1726; Alicante, Spain
- Died: January 9, 1798 (aged 71); Madrid, Spain
- Occupations: Merchant and diplomat
- Known for: First Spanish envoy to the Ottoman Empire
- Spouse: Elena Viviana Marconié y Peñarroja (m. 1755)

Juan Ventura Bouligny y Paret (1726–1798), known as Juan de Bouligny, was an 18th century Spanish merchant and diplomat who served as Spain's first envoy to the Ottoman Empire.

== Early life ==
Bouligny was born in 1726 in Alicante, Spain, the second son of Jean (Juan) Bouligny y Largier, a successful merchant of French ancestry, and María Antonia Paret y Vinet, who was from Alicante. When he came of age, Bouligny joined the family import-export business, which traded textiles, spices, wines, and more from both around the Mediterranean and across the Atlantic. Based in Alicante, the family did business with British, Dutch, and French merchants plying the routes around the Mediterranean. In 1753, Bouligny was chosen to represent the Alicante Spanish Commerce Committee in Madrid. He contintued to oversee the family's trading company until 1771 when he moved to Madrid where he remained until 1777. During the 1770s, as Bouligny sought a governmental position, he began styling himself as "Juan de Bouligny," to imply royal ancestry. By June 1777, Bouligny was gaining more attention. He joined the Real Sociedad Económica Matritense de Amigos del País commercial and scientific society, and he wrote four essays on the economy that were delivered to the Count of Floridablanca.

== Engagement with the Ottoman Empire ==
By the late 1770s, the Bouligny Brothers Company's extensive network of trading partners, along with Bouligny's writings, had drawn the attention of the Spanish statesman and reformer Floridablanca who tasked Bouligny with negotiating a political and economic relationship with the Ottoman Empire on behalf of the king, Charles III. A particular goal of the negotiations was to end the Spanish–Algerian war and attacks from North Africa on Spain's commercial activities and ports.

In 1778, as Bouligny travelled to Constantinople, he took care to prepare for his new duties. During stays in Genoa and Venice, he gathered intelligence on Ottoman politics and trade. From the Count of Finocchietti, the Kingdom of Naples's ambassador to the Serene Republic, he learned details of how the 1740 treaty between the kingdom and the Ottomans was negotiated, as well as the complex protocols of the sultan's court. Finocchietti also provided a letter of introduction to the current Neapolitan ambassador in Constantinople, Guglielmo Maurizio Ludolf. Bouligny's stay in Italy, although very informative, was delayed due to disease outbreaks along his route east. Rather than continuing by land, he journeyed to Livorno to find a ship headed to Constantinople. Bouligny and his son José Eliodoro found passage on a merchant ship owned by Hamburg-based Otto Frank & Co.

On April 30, 1779, Bouligny and his son arrived in Constantinople. Bouligny sought an agreement based upon the treaty of trade and friendship the sultan signed with the Kingdom of Naples in 1740, but the negotiations were long and drawn out, as well as complicated by the need to rely on non-Spanish dragomans as interpreters and go-betweens. An agreement was finally signed between Spain and the Ottomans on 14 September 1782, and Bouligny was officially installed as Spain's extraordinary envoy and plenipotentiary minister to the Sublime Porte. As envoy, he worked to establish a Spanish consular network within the empire and a school to train Spanish boys in Turkish language and culture to serve as dragomans. He also made careful notes about the mercantile activities of traders from across Europe in Constantinople, both to report back to Spain and to strengthen his business interests in the region. Bouligny left Constantinople in 1793, leaving his son to oversee the family's mercantile operations. The younger Bouligny continued to serve as Spain's representative to the Ottomans until he was expelled in 1799 following the invasion of Egypt by Spain's ally France.

== Personal life ==
Bouligny married Elena Viviana Marconié y Peñarroja (b. 1736), the daughter of a former French counsel, in 1755, and they had two daughters and three sons. Elena and her daughters joined Bouligny in Constantinople for several years after his appointment, participating in the first diplomats' opera in the Ottoman Empire in 1786.

After leaving Constantinople in 1793, Bouligny returned to Spain, where he died in 1798.
