= Bombardment of Algiers (1784) =

1784 naval bombardment of Algiers by multiple Southern European powers

- Part of the Spanish–Algerian War
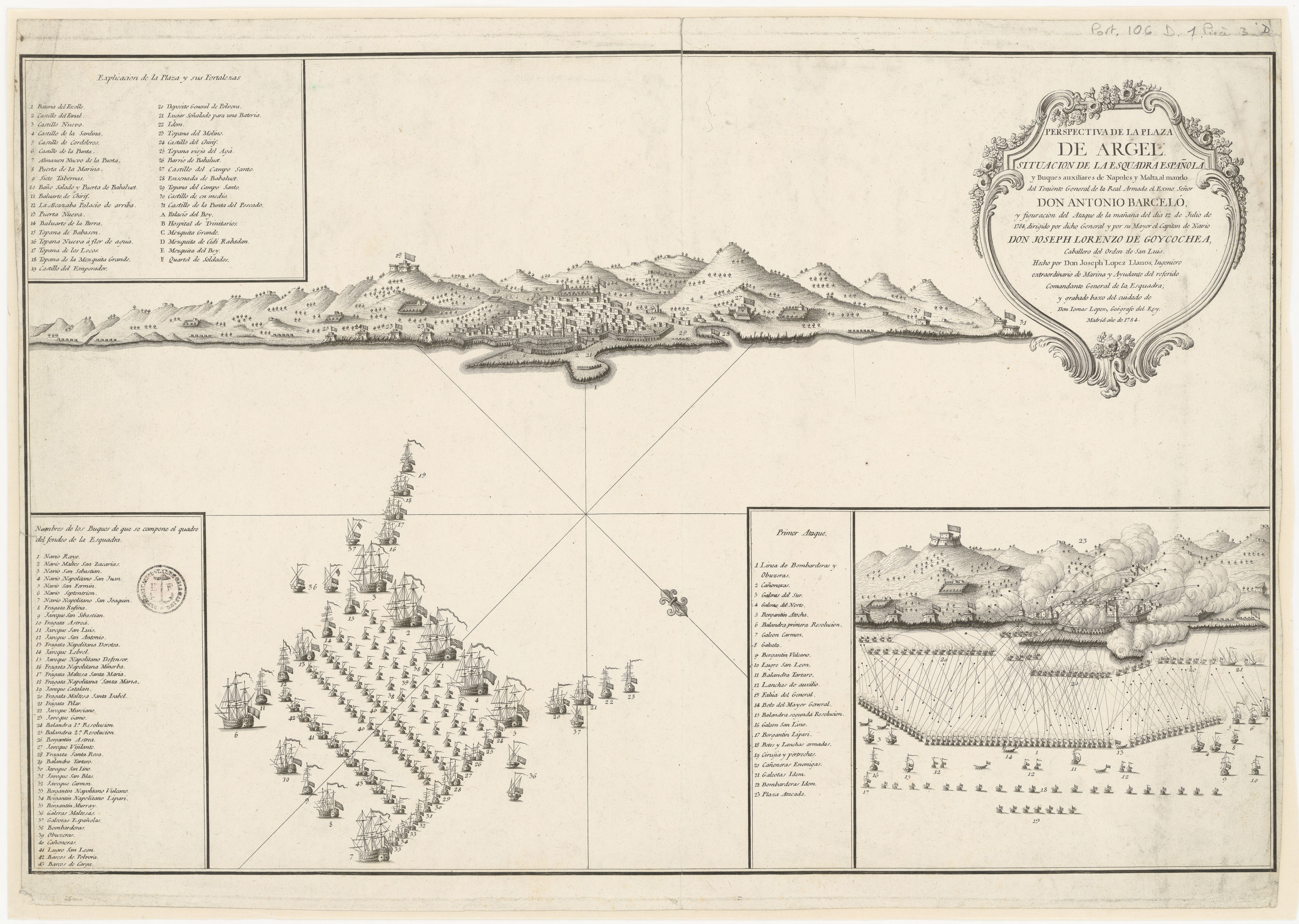
- 1784 depiction of the first day of bombardment by José López Llanos
Date	12 July 1784
Location	Algiers, Regency of Algiers
Result	Algerian victory

Belligerents
Spain; Kingdom of Sicily; Order of Malta; Kingdom of Naples; Kingdom of Portugal	Regency of Algiers

Commanders and leaders
Antonio Barceló; Jose de Mazarredo	Muhammad V Ali Agha

Strength
9 ships of the line 11 frigates 14 xebecs 90 smaller warships	4,000 volunteers 70 galiots and gunboats

Casualties and losses
1 felucca sunk 1 gunboat destroyed 53 killed 64 wounded	Most of the vessels in the harbour sunk

The bombardment of Algiers took place between 12 and 21 July 1784. A joint Spanish-Neapolitan-Maltese-Portuguese fleet commanded by the Spanish Admiral Antonio Barceló bombarded the city, which was the main base of the Barbary corsairs, with the aim of forcing them to interrupt their activities. The second bombardment followed a similarly failed expedition the preceding year.

== Background ==
In August 1783, in response to acts of piracy undertaken by the city, a Spanish fleet with Maltese participation under Antonio Barceló bombarded Algiers for 8 days. The expedition ended in failure with some casualties, vast expenditure of ammunition and no effect. Significant propaganda was made by the participants to portray the attack as a success, but it only inflicted minor damages and was described by the Spanish court as a "festival of fireworks too costly and long for how little it entertained the Moors". Five Algerian privateers captured two Spanish merchant vessels near Palamós in September 1783 as a gesture of defiance. The city's defenses were reinforced with a new 50-gun fortress, 4,000 Turkish volunteer soldiers were recruited in Anatolia, and European aides were hired to assist in the building fortifications and batteries. In addition, at least 70 vessels were prepared to repel the Spanish, and a reward of one thousand gold pieces was offered by the Dey to anyone who captured a ship of the attacking fleet.

Meanwhile, in Cartagena, Barceló had finished preparations for a new expedition. His fleet consisted of four 80-gun ships of line, four frigates, 12 xebecs, 3 brigs, 9 small vessels, and an attacking force of 24 gunboats armed with pieces of 24 pounds, 8 more with 18 pounds' pieces, 7 lightly armed to board the Algerian vessels, 24 armed with mortars, and 8 bomb vessels with 8 pound pieces. The expedition was financed by Pope Pius VI and supported by the Navy of the Kingdom of the Two Sicilies, which provided two ships of the line, three frigates, two brigs and two xebecs under Admiral Bologna, by the Order of Malta, which provided a ship of line, two frigates and five galleys, and by that of Portugal, which provided two ships of line and two frigates under Admiral Ramires Esquível. These last joined the allied fleet later and arrived in the middle of the bombardment.

== Bombardment ==
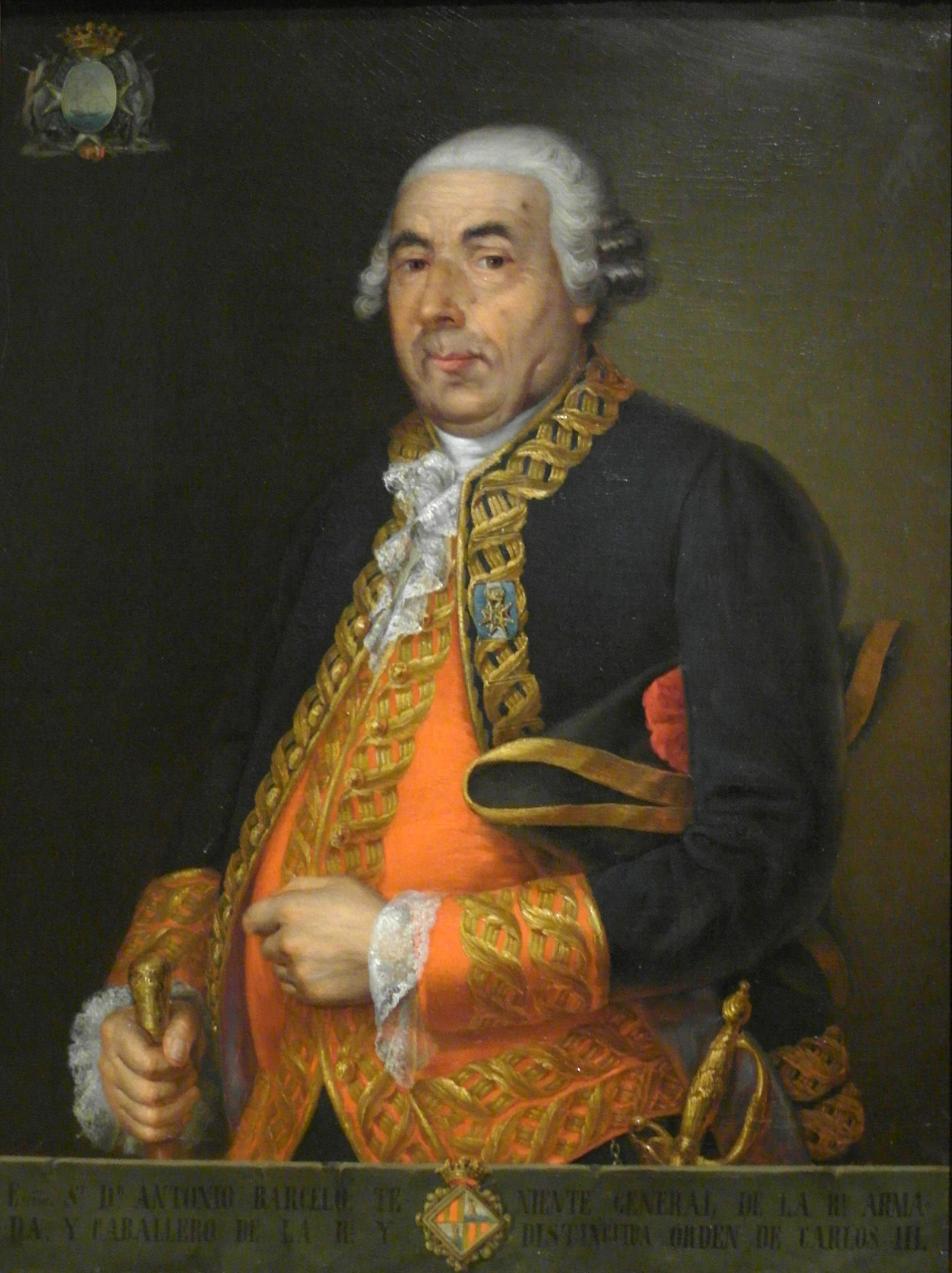
Portrait of Antonio Barceló. 1848 copy from an 18th-century original that was at Palma de Mallorca's Town Hall.

On 28 June, having entrusted itself to the Virgen del Carmen, the Allied fleet sailed from Cartagena, arriving off Algiers on 10 July. Two days later at 8:30 AM, the bombardment began with the Spanish ships opening fire. It was kept up until 4:20 PM, during which time about 600 bombs, 1,440 cannon balls and 260 shells were fired over the city, compared to 202 bombs and 1,164 cannonballs fired by the Algerians. Major damage to the city and its fortifications and a large fire were observed. An attack by light vessels of the Algerian fleet, composed of 67 ships, was repulsed, four of them being destroyed. The Allied casualties were minimal: 6 killed and 9 wounded, most of them due to accidents with the fuses of the bombs. Gunboat No. 27, commanded by the Neapolitan ensign José Rodríguez, exploded accidentally, killing 25 sailors.

In the following eight days, seven additional attacks were ordered. The Algerians had placed a line of barges armed with artillery that largely prevented the Allied gunboats getting close to their objectives. A shot fired from the fortifications hit the felucca from which Barceló was directing the bombing, sinking it. José Lorenzo de Goicoechea came to the aid of the admiral, who was rescued unscathed. Passing immediately to another boat, Barceló continued leading the attack, downplaying the importance of the incident. Finally, on 21 July, it was decided to end the attack. Contrary winds forced Barceló to give the order to return to Cartagena. More than 20,000 cannonballs and grenades had been fired on the city, badly damaging the city and causing the sinking in the harbour of most of the Algerian vessels. The Allied casualties were 53 men killed and 64 wounded, most due to accidents.

== Aftermath ==
The bombardment was unsuccessful, but the Dey finally opened to negotiations in 1785, alerted by a third bombardment being in the works and the promise of bombarding Algiers every year until they became willing to negotiate. The bombardments had already convinced the Ottoman Tripolitania to sign a peace treaty with Spain in 1784. Eventually, a peace treaty was signed on June 14, 1786, putting an end to Barbary privateering against Spain and allowing a Spanish consulate in Algiers along with toleration of Catholicism in the city, in exchange for a final payment of 700,000 pesos. It was later found out the parts had signed two different treaties, which had to be sorted out with new negotiations, but except by some alterations in relation to the Spanish possession of Oran, the final treatise was left according to the Spanish version.

For the first time in centuries, Spain found itself free from being a target of the Barbary slave trade, which led to the extensive development of villages and crops on the Mediterranean coast, previously deterred from exploiting due to the attacks of Barbary corsairs. In order to honor the conclusion of the conflict and open trade, Floridablanca sent a diplomatic fleet to Constantinople. However, Barbary attacks would return during the instability of the Napoleonic Wars, until eventually disappearing with the French conquest of Algeria.
