= Gunboat =

Naval watercraft designed to carry and utilize firepower

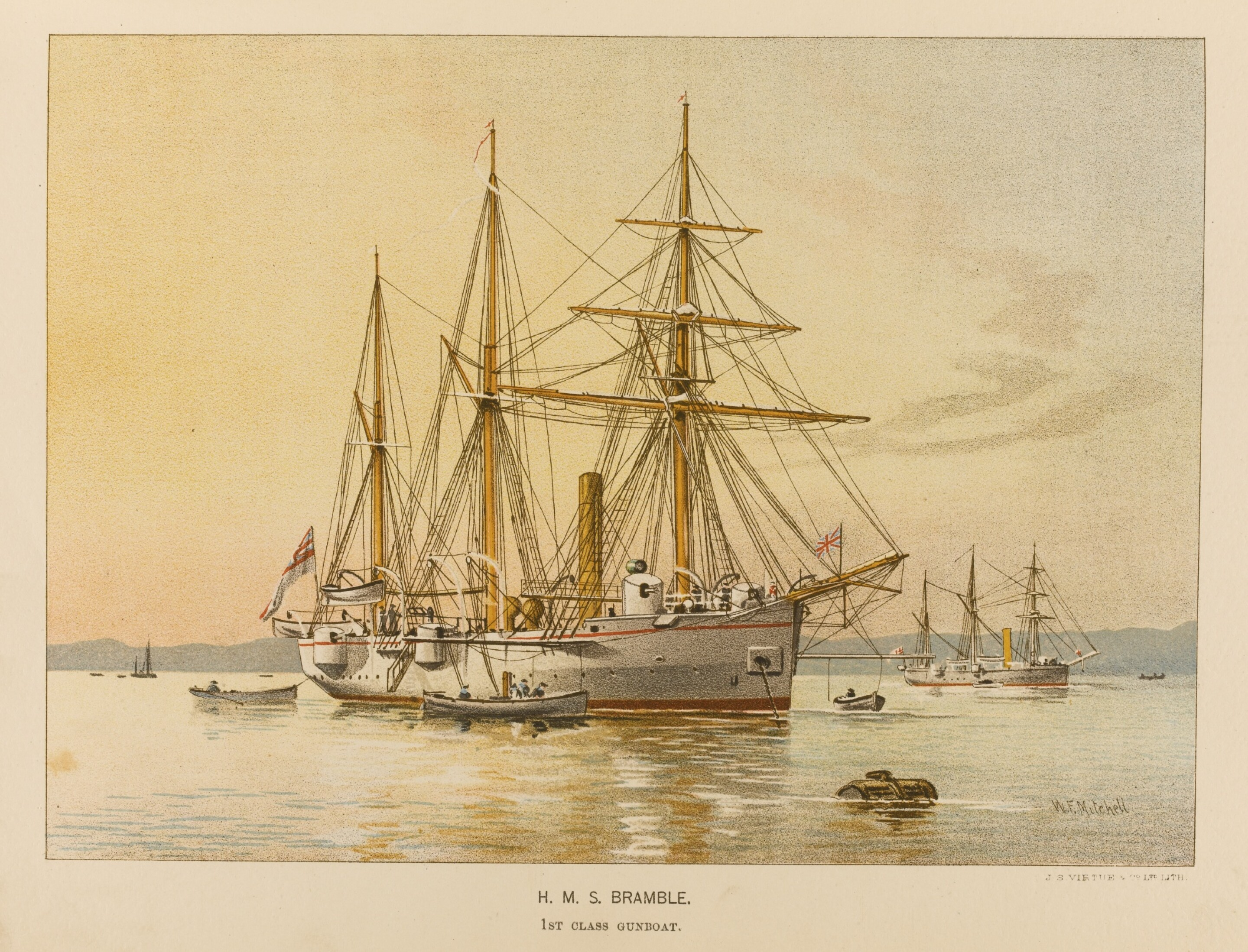
A Bramble-class gunboat, built for the Royal Navy in 1886

A gunboat is a naval watercraft designed for the express purpose of carrying one or more guns to bombard coastal targets, as opposed to those military craft designed for naval warfare, or for ferrying troops or supplies.

== History ==
=== Pre-steam era ===
In the Age of Sail, a gunboat was usually a small undecked vessel carrying a single smoothbore cannon in the bow, or just two or three such cannons. A gunboat could carry one or two masts or be oar-powered only, but the single-masted version of about 15 m (49 ft) length was most typical. Some types of gunboats carried two cannon, or else mounted a number of swivel guns on the railings.

The small gunboat had advantages: if it only carried a single cannon, the boat could manoeuvre in shallow or restricted areas – such as rivers or lakes – where larger ships could sail only with difficulty. The gun that such boats carried could be quite heavy; a 32-pounder for instance. As such boats were cheap and quick to build, naval forces favoured swarm tactics: while a single hit from a frigate's broadside would destroy a gunboat, a frigate facing a large squadron of gunboats could suffer serious damage before it could manage to sink them all. For example: during the 1808 Battle of Alvøen of the Gunboat War, five Dano-Norwegian gunboats disabled the British frigate HMS Tartar. Gunboats used in the Battle of Valcour Island (1776) on Lake Champlain during the American Revolutionary War were mostly built on the spot, attesting to the speed of their construction.

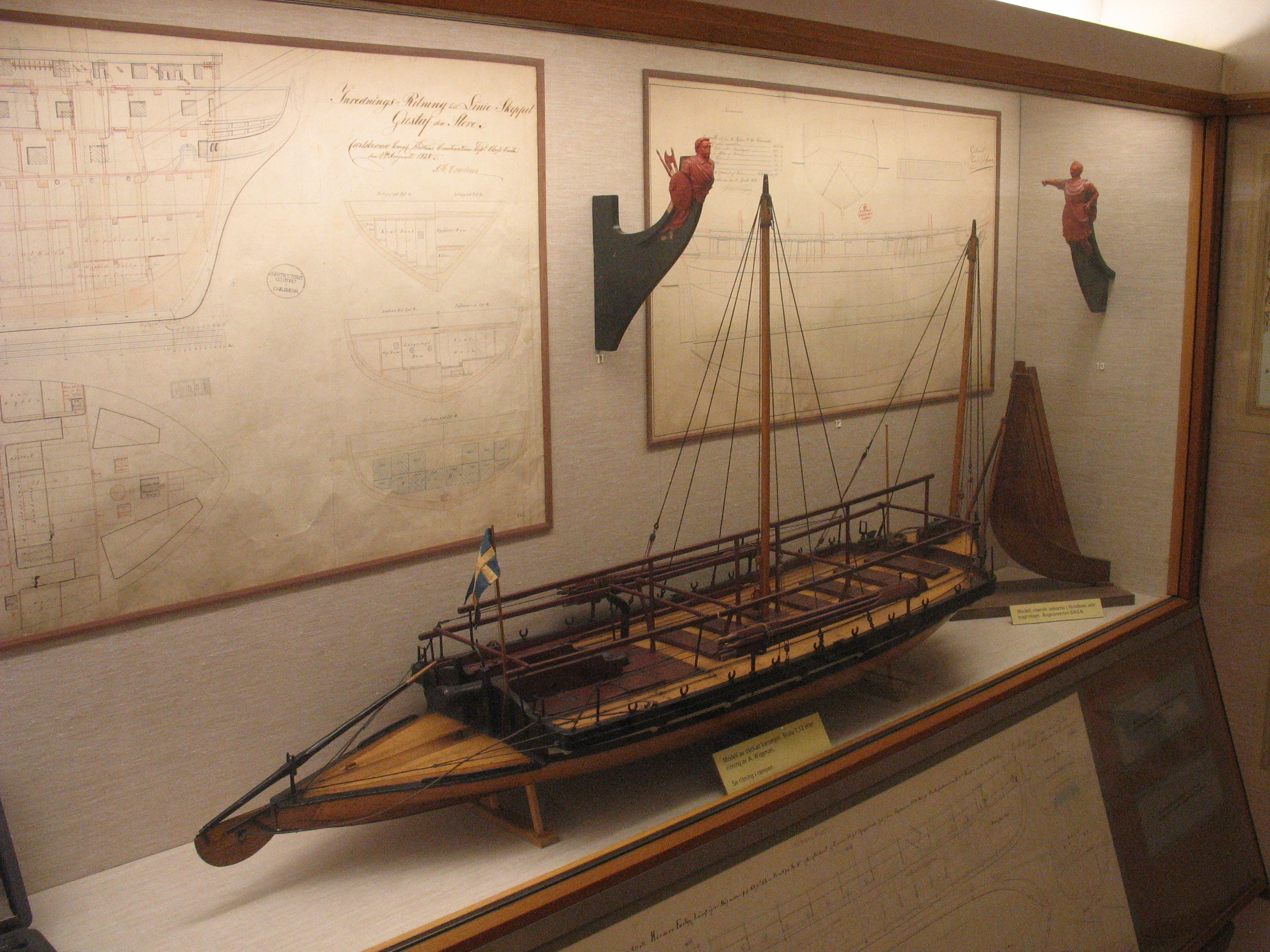
A model of a type of decked "gun yawl" designed by Fredrik Henrik af Chapman and used by the Swedish archipelago fleet

Spanish admiral Antonio Barceló, experienced in the usage of small vessels in the conflicts against Barbary pirates, unveiled in 1781 a kind of small armored gunboat equipped with a heavy, long-range artillery piece. This originated the Spanish Royal Armada's doctrine of fuerzas sutiles, which emphasized the usage of ships equipped with significant firepower but small enough to be difficult to hit back. His gunboats were first employed during the Great Siege of Gibraltar, obtaining great success in the otherwise failed siege, after which they were adopted by the Royal Armada.

All navies of the sailing era kept a number of gunboats on hand. Gunboats saw extensive use in the Baltic Sea during the late 18th century as they were well-suited for the extensive coastal skerries and archipelagoes of Sweden, Finland and Russia. The rivalry between Sweden and Russia, in particular, led to an intense expansion of gunboat fleets and the development of new gunboat types. The two countries clashed during the Russo-Swedish war of 1788–1790, a conflict that culminated in the massive Battle of Svensksund in 1790, in which over 30,000 men and hundreds of gunboats, galleys and other oared craft took part. The majority of these were vessels developed from the 1770s and onwards by the naval architect Fredrik Henrik af Chapman for the Swedish archipelago fleet. The designs, copied and refined by the rival Danish and Russian navies, spread to the Mediterranean and to the Black Sea.

Two variants occurred most commonly:

- a larger 20 m (66 ft) "gun sloop" (from the Swedish kanonslup) with two 24-pounder cannon, one in the stern and one in the bow
- a smaller 15 m (49 ft) "gun yawl" (kanonjolle) with a single 24-pounder cannon

Many of the Baltic navies kept gunboats in service well into the second half of the 19th century. British ships engaged larger 22 m (72 ft) Russian gunboats off Turku in southeast Finland in 1854 during the Crimean War. The Russian vessels had the distinction of being the last oared vessels of war in history to fire their guns in anger.

Gunboats played a key role in Napoleon Bonaparte's plan for the invasion of England in 1804. Denmark-Norway used them heavily in the Gunboat War. Between 1803 and 1812 the United States Navy had a policy of basing its navy on coastal gunboats, experimenting with a variety of designs. President Thomas Jefferson (in office: 1801–1809) and his Democratic-Republican Party opposed a strong navy, regarding gunboats as adequate to defend the United States' major harbors. They performed well when properly supported with larger ships during battle, but were of little use on their own against the British blockade during the War of 1812.

=== Steam era ===
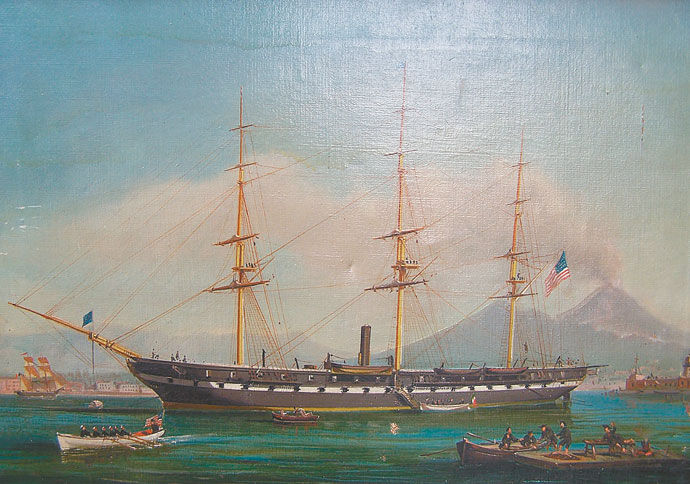
The screw gunboat USS Alliance, circa 1880

With the introduction of steam power in the early 19th century, the Royal Navy and other navies built considerable numbers of small vessels propelled by side paddles and later by screws. Initially, these vessels retained full sailing rigs and used steam engines for auxiliary propulsion.

The British Royal Navy deployed two wooden paddle-gunboats in the Lower Great Lakes and St. Lawrence River during the Rebellions of 1837 in Upper and Lower Canada. The United States Navy deployed an iron-hulled paddle gunboat, USS Michigan, to the Great Lakes in 1844.

Von der Tann became the first propeller-driven gunboat in the world. Conradi shipyards in Kiel built the steam-powered 120 long tons (120 t) gunboat in 1849 for the small navy of Schleswig-Holstein. Initially called "Gunboat No. 1", Von der Tann was the most modern ship in the navy. She participated successfully in the First Schleswig War of 1848–1851.

Britain built a large number of wooden screw-gunboats during the 1850s, some of which participated in the Crimean War (1853–1856), Second Opium War (1856–1860) and Indian Mutiny (1857–1859). The requirement for gunboats in the Crimean War was formulated in 1854 to allow the Royal Navy to bombard shore facilities in the Baltic. The first ships the Royal Navy built that met this requirement were the Arrow-class gunvessels. Then in mid-1854 the Royal Navy ordered six Gleaner-class gunboats followed later in the year by an order for 20 Dapper-class gunboats. In May 1855 the Royal Navy deployed six Dapper-class gunboats in the Sea of Azov, where they repeatedly raided and destroyed stores around its coast. In June 1855 the Royal Navy reentered the Baltic with a total of 18 gunboats as part of a larger fleet. The gunboats attacked various coastal facilities, operating alongside larger British warships from which they drew supplies such as coal.

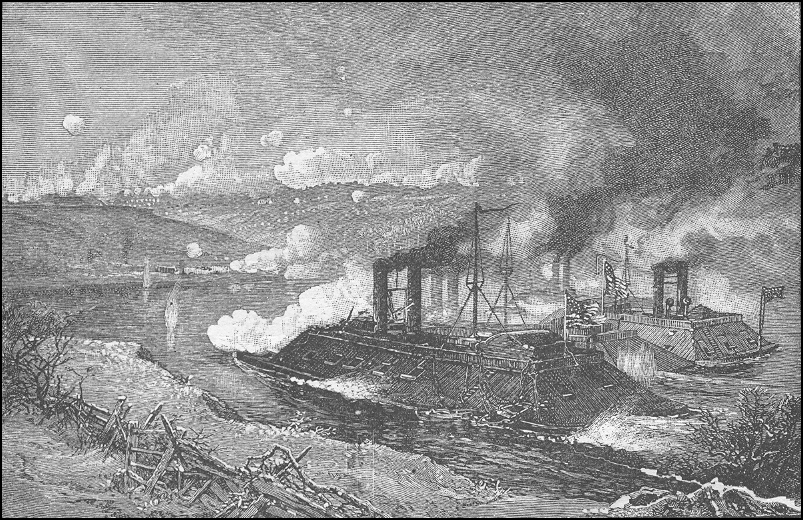
Union ironclad river gunboats assault the Confederates at Fort Donelson in February 1862, during the American Civil War

Gunboats experienced a revival during the American Civil War (1861–1865). Union and Confederate forces quickly converted existing passenger-carrying boats into armed sidewheel steamers. Later, some purpose-built boats, such as USS Miami, joined the fray. They frequently mounted 12 or more guns, sometimes of rather large caliber, and usually carried some armor. At the same time, Britain's gunboats from the Crimean War period were starting to wear out, so a new series of classes was ordered. Construction shifted from a purely wooden hull to an iron–teak composite.

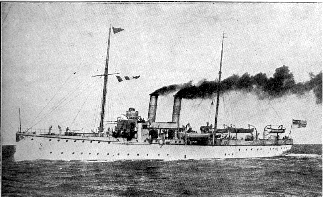
SMS Panther, a gunboat diplomat in the Agadir Crisis of 1911

In the later 19th century and early 20th century, "gunboat" was the common name for smaller armed vessels. These could be classified, from the smallest to the largest, into river gunboats, river monitors, coastal-defense gunboats (such as SMS Panther), and full-fledged monitors for coastal bombardments. In the 1870s and 1880s, Britain took to building so-called "flat-iron" (or Rendel) gunboats for coastal defence. When there would be few opportunities to re-coal, vessels carrying a full sailing rig continued in use as gunboats; HMS Gannet, a sloop preserved at Chatham Historic Dockyard in the United Kingdom, exemplifies this type of gunboat.

In the United States Navy, these boats had the hull classification symbol "PG", which led to their being referred to as "patrol gunboats". They usually displaced under 2,000 long tons (2,000 t), were about 200 ft (61 m) long, 10–15 ft (3.0–4.6 m) draught and sometimes much less, and mounted several guns of calibers up to 5–6 in (130–150 mm). An important characteristic of these was the ability to operate in rivers, enabling them to reach inland targets in a way not otherwise possible before the development of aircraft. In this period the naval powers used gunboats for police actions in colonies or in weaker countries, for example in China (see e.g. Yangtze Patrol). This category of gunboat inspired the term "gunboat diplomacy". With the addition of torpedoes, they became "torpedo gunboats", designated by the hull classification symbol "PTG" (Patrol Torpedo Gunboat).

In Britain, Admiral Fisher's reforms in the 1900s saw the disposal of much of the gunboat fleet. A handful remained in service in various roles at the start of World War I in 1914. The last in active service were two of the second Bramble class which survived until 1926, carrying out river patrols in west Africa.

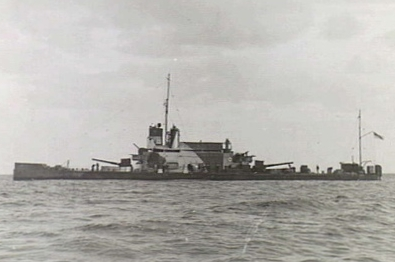
Insect-class HMS Ladybird (with larger-calibre guns installed in 1939)

In the circumstances of World War I (1914–1918), however, the Royal Navy re-equipped with small 625-long-ton (635 t), shallow-draught gunboats (12 ships of the Insect class) with sufficient speed to operate in fast-flowing rivers and with relatively heavy armament. During the war and in the post-war period, these were deployed in Romania on the Danube, in Mesopotamia on the Euphrates and Tigris, in northern Russia on the Northern Dvina, and in China on the Yangtze. In China, during anarchic and war conditions, they continued to protect British interests until World War II; other western Powers acted similarly.

More and larger gunboats were built in the late 1930s for the Far East. Some sailed there; others were transported in sections and reassembled at Shanghai.

=== World War II ===
==== United Kingdom ====
Most British gunboats were based initially in East Asia. When war with Japan broke out, many of these vessels withdrew to the Indian Ocean. Others were given to the Republic of China Navy (such as HMS Sandpiper, which was renamed Ying Hao) and some were captured by the Japanese.

Some were later redeployed to the Mediterranean theatre and supported land operations during the North African campaign, as well as in parts of Southern Europe.

==== United States ====
In late 1941, the US Navy's Yangtze Patrol boats based in China were withdrawn to the Philippines or scuttled. Following the US defeat in the Philippines, most of the remaining craft were scuttled. However, USS Asheville survived until being sunk in action during the Battle of Java in 1942.

==== Soviet Union ====
===== Riverine armoured motor gunboats =====
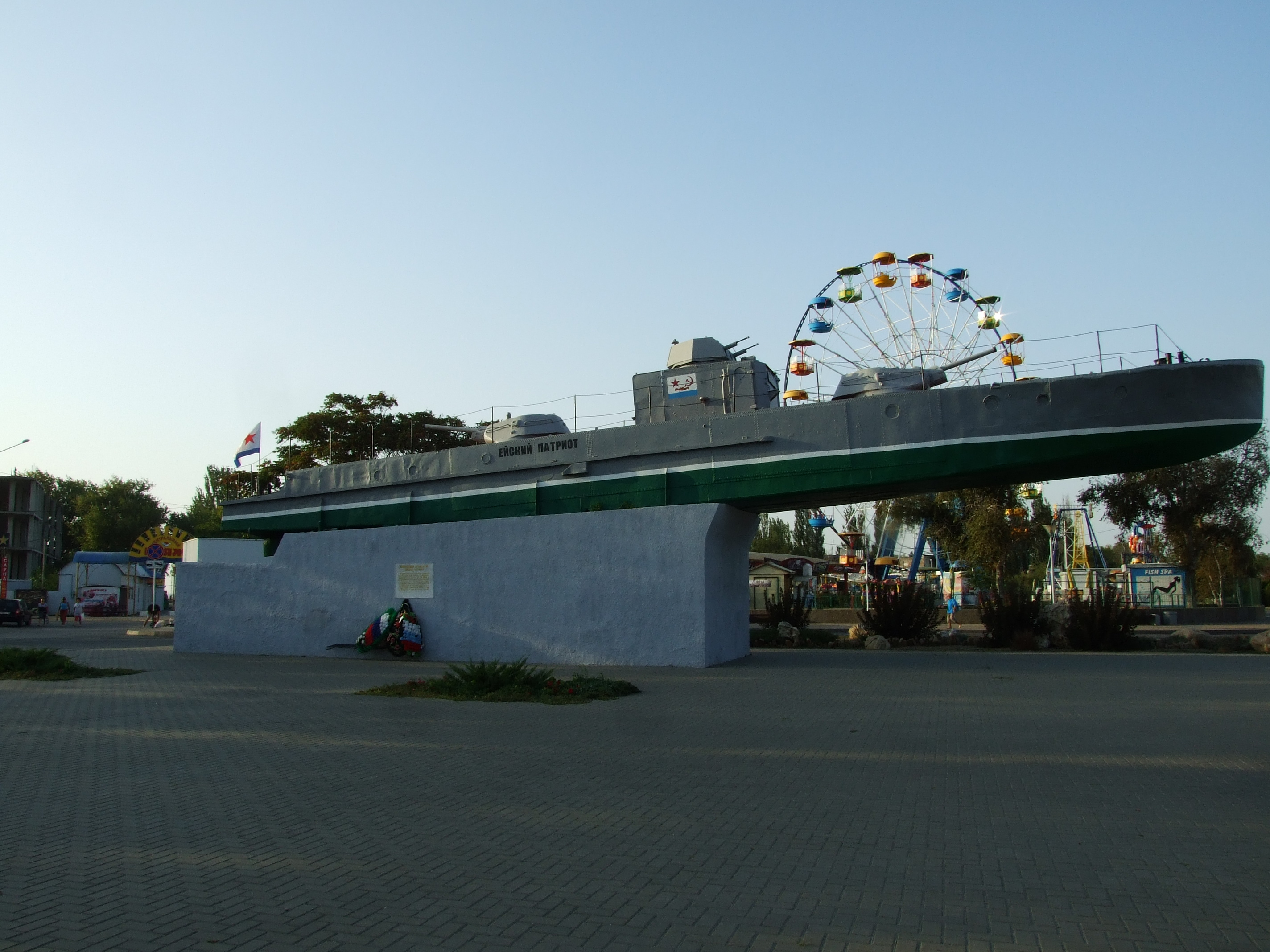
The ex–Soviet Type 1124BKA armoured motor gunboat BK-162 Yeysky Patriot is now a memorial ship in Yeysk, 2017

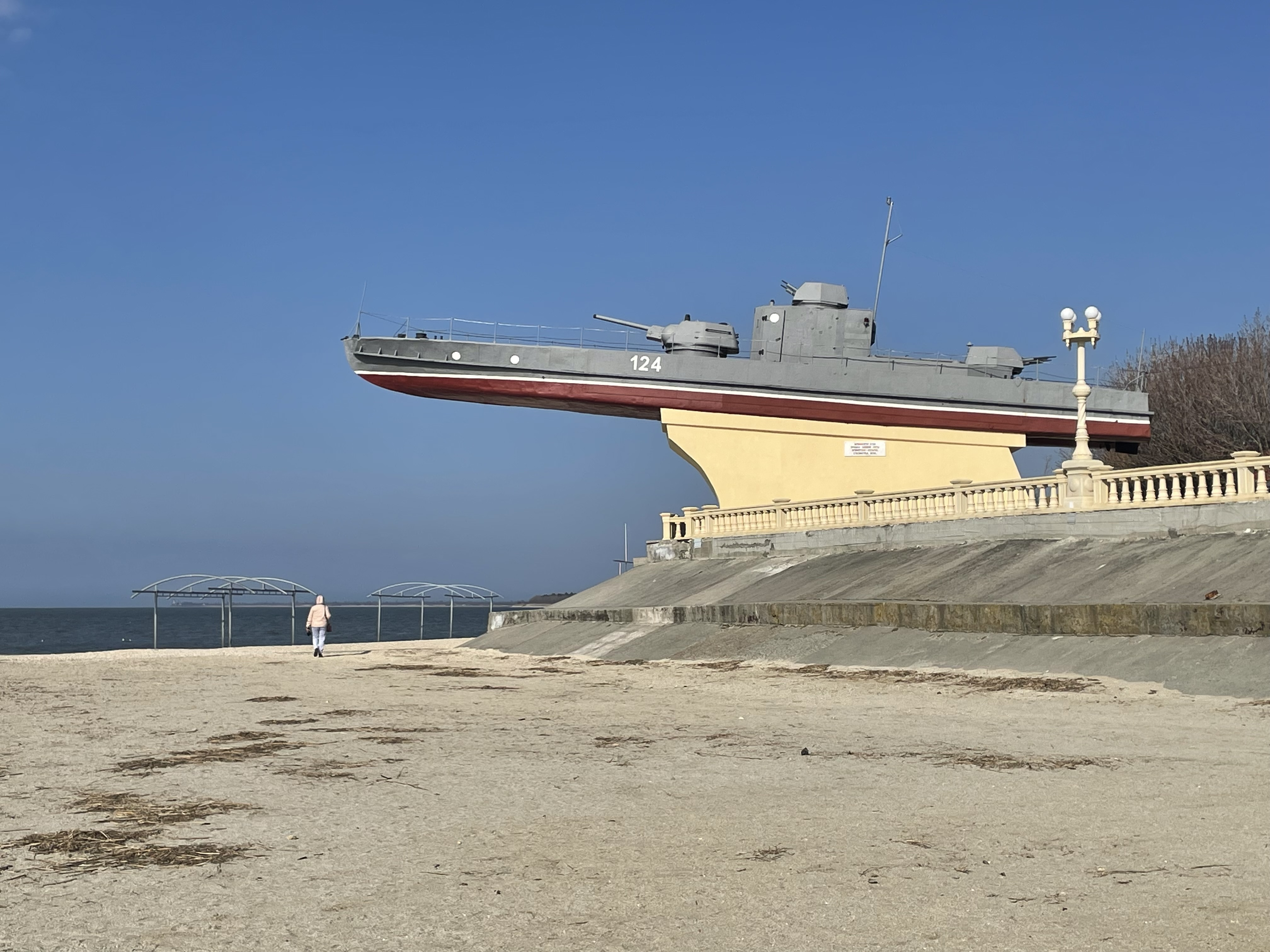
The ex–Soviet Type 1125BKA armoured motor gunboat BK-124 Geroy Sovietskogo Soyuza Golubets is now a memorial ship in Primorsko-Akhtarsk, 2024

During the 1930s, the Soviet Navy began developing riverine armoured motor gunboats (Russian: бронекатер, romanized: bronekater, lit. 'armoured motorboat'; abbr. БКА, BKA) or "riverine tanks": vessels displacing 29 to 42 tonnes, on which the turrets of tanks were mounted.

Two classes, numbering 210 vessels, saw service between 1935 and 1945:

Type 1124BKA armoured motor gunboat
The Type 1124BKA, Soviet designation Project 1124, was a series of 42-tonne vessels. Their standard armament was initially two T-28 (later T-34) tank turrets, each mounting a 76.2 mm (3 in) gun and a coaxial 7.62 mm DT machine gun, as well as up to four 7.62 mm or 12.7 mm anti-aircraft machine guns – in some cases the rear turret was replaced with a Katyusha rocket launcher. Propulsion: two 800-brake-horsepower petrol engines (in general); two shafts. Armour: CT and a belt = 1/2 in (13 mm); machine gun turret faces = 2 in (51 mm).

Type 1125BKA armoured motor gunboat
The Type 1125BKA, Soviet designation Project 1125, was a series of 29-tonne vessels. Armament: one T-28 (later T-34) tank turret with a 76.2 mm gun and a coaxial 7.62 mm DT machine gun, as well as up to four 7.62 mm or 12.7 mm anti-aircraft machine guns. Propulsion: one 720-brake-horsepower petrol engine (in general); one shaft. Armour: machine gun turret faces = 2 in (51 mm); light plating on CT and sides.
S-40 (Type 1125BKA version with two Kharkiv model V-2 diesel engines): one T-34 tank turret with a 76.2 mm gun and a coaxial 7.62 mm DT machine gun, as well as up to four 7.62 mm or 12.7 mm anti-aircraft machine guns. A total of 7 S-40-subclass boats were built.

With crews of 10 to 17 personnel, riverine tanks displaced 29 to 42 tonnes (29 to 41 long tons; 32 to 46 short tons), had armour 4–14 mm (0.16–0.55 in) thick, and were 22.6 to 25 m (74 ft 2 in to 82 ft 0 in) long. They saw significant action in the Baltic and Black Seas between 1941 and 1945.

===== Seagoing armoured motor gunboats =====
Another type of (seagoing) armoured motor gunboat was developed during World War II. The design for this was drawn up shortly before the outbreak of war as an enlarged version of the Type 1124BKA. The construction of the prototype was begun in Leningrad in 1941 and this was completed in 1943. Further vessels were built in 1944. Intended for use in the shallow waters of the Baltic Sea, they were in the event employed for a wide range of duties.

MBK-type armoured motor gunboat
MBK (Russian: МБК, an initialism for морской бронекатер, morskoy bronekater, 'seagoing armoured motorboat'), Soviet designation Project 161, was a series of 150-tonne (150-long-ton; 170-short-ton) vessels. Armament: two T-34 tank turrets each with a 76.2 mm gun and a coaxial 7.62 mm DT machine gun (later two T-34-85 tank turrets each with a 85 mm gun and a coaxial 7.62 mm DT machine gun), as well as two 45 mm 21-K anti-aircraft guns, one 37 mm 70-K anti-aircraft gun, and up to three 12.7 mm anti-aircraft machine guns or two twin 12.7 mm machine guns instead of 45 mm 21-K guns. Propulsion: two 500-brake-horsepower diesel engines (in general); two shafts. Armour: CT and turrets = 1 1/4 to 2 in (32 to 51 mm).

With crews of 38 to 42 personnel, MBK-type armoured motor gunboats measured 36.0 m × 5.4 m × 1.5 m (118 ft 1 in × 17 ft 9 in × 4 ft 11 in). A total of 20 boats of this type were built.

=== Vietnam War ===
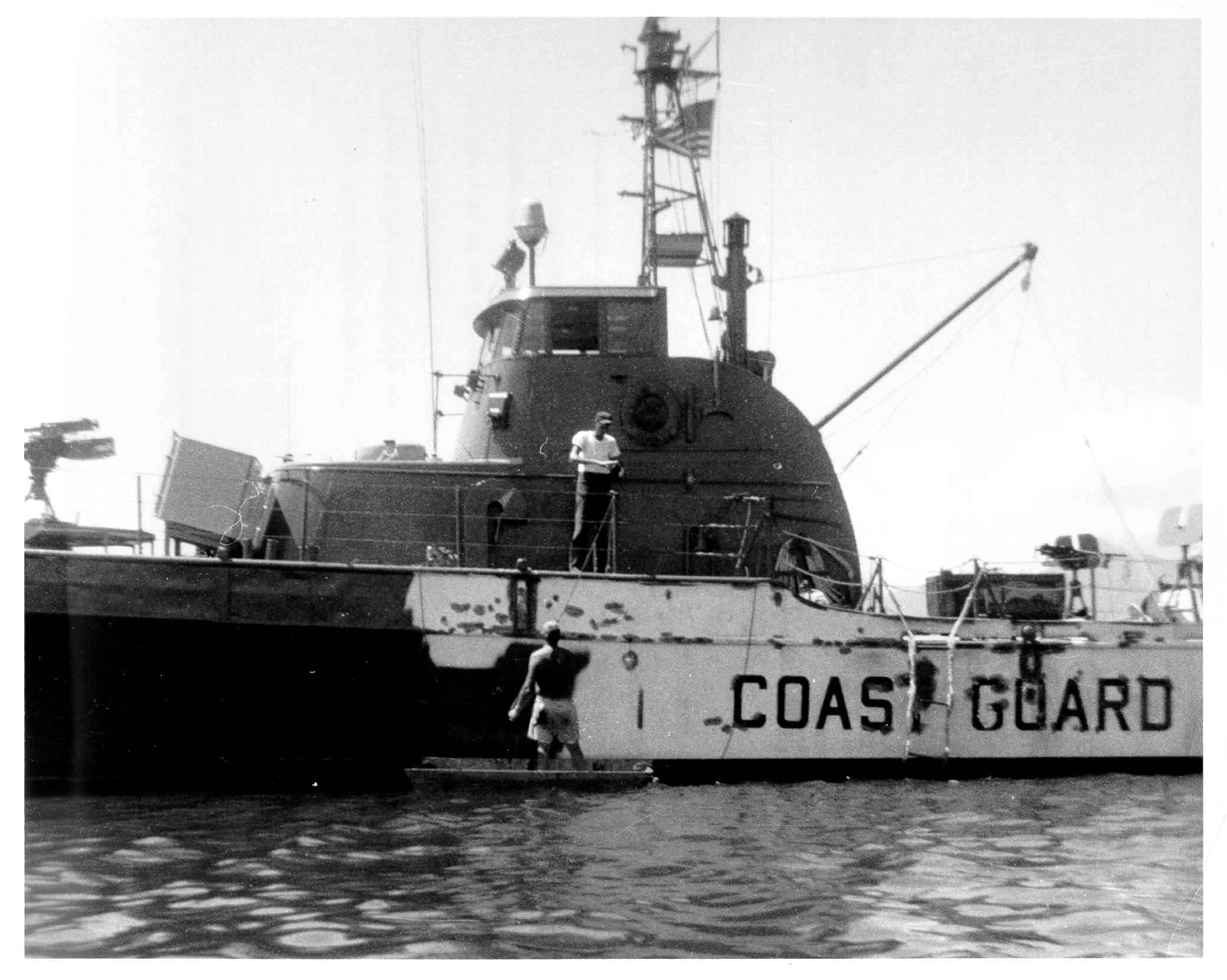
Point Gammon gets a camouflage coat of dark grey paint at Da Nang, October 1965, for its conversion from Coast Guard use to Vietnam War river patrol duties

US riverine gunboats in the Vietnam War, included Patrol Boats River (PBR), constructed of fiberglass; Patrol Craft Fast (PCF), commonly known as Swift Boats, built of aluminum; and Assault Support Patrol Boats (ASPB) built of steel. U.S. Coast Guard 82-foot (25 m) Point-class cutters supplemented these US Navy vessels. The ASPBs were commonly referred to as "Alpha" boats and primarily carried out mine-sweeping duties along the waterways, due to their all-steel construction. The ASPBs were the only US Navy riverine craft specifically designed and built for the Vietnam War. All of these boats were assigned to the US Navy's "Brownwater Navy".

== Surviving vessels ==
- (1776) - USS Philadelphia resides at the National Museum of American History in Washington, D.C.
- (1861) - USS Cairo is on display at the Vicksburg National Military Park in Vicksburg, Mississippi.
- (1863) - The remains of CSS Chattahoochee are currently on display at the National Civil War Naval Museum in Columbus, Georgia.
- (1884) - BAE Abdón Calderón is preserved as a museum ship in Guayaquil, Ecuador.
- (1905) - BAP América resides in Iquitos, Peru.
- (1912) - SS Zhongshan is currently preserved in Wuhan, China.
- (1930) - ARP Humaitá, museum ship as of 1992 located in Asunción, Paraguay.

== See also ==
- Torpedo gunboat
- List of gunboat and gunvessel classes of the Royal Navy
- Japanese gunboat Chiyodagata
- Japanese gunboat Seta
- Japanese gunboat Un'yō
- Russian gunboat Korietz
- Soviet gunboat Krasnoye Znamya
- Spanish gunboat Callao
- Spanish gunboat General Concha
- Spanish gunboat Marques del Duero
- Yorktown-class gunboat
- TT-400TP gunboat
- NMS Grivița
- NMS Sublocotenent Ghiculescu
