= John Devonshire =

Officer in the Royal Navy during the French Revolutionary and Napoleonic Wars

Rear-Admiral Sir John Devonshire KCH
- Born: 1774; Cornwall, England
- Died: 19 February 1839 (aged 64–65); Stonehouse, Plymouth
- Education: Truro Grammar School
- Military career
- Allegiance: United Kingdom
- Branch: Royal Navy
- Service years: 1788–1830
- Rank: Rear-Admiral
- Commands: HMS Mahonesa; HMS Dart; HMS Alcmene; HMS Glatton; HMS Armada; HMS St Albans; HMS Albion; HMS Sceptre; HMS Kent
- Conflicts: French Revolutionary Wars; Battle of Martinique; Invasion of Guadeloupe; Action of 13 October 1796; Battle of Copenhagen; Napoleonic Wars; Siege of Cádiz; War of 1812

Rear-Admiral Sir John Ferris Devonshire KCH (1774– 19 February 1839) was an officer in the Royal Navy. He joined as a volunteer aboard HMS Cumberland in 1788 and served in various vessels in the waters around North America and the West Indies until 1795 when he moved to HMS Boyne, the flagship of John Jervis. Devonshire was acting lieutenant for a while before Jervis promoted him to full lieutenant aboard HMS Terpsichore, at that time employed in the defence of a British garrison under siege on Basse-Terre.

On 13 October 1796, Terpsichore captured the Spanish frigate, Mahonesa off Cartagena. Devonshire was mentioned in dispatches for his part in the battle and consequently promoted to commander. In July 1800, Devonshire was given command of His Majesty's Sloop Dart and fought on board at the Battle of Copenhagen on 2 April following, after which he was made an acting captain. His promotion was confirmed on 27 April and he took command of HMS Glatton until the French Revolutionary War ended in 1802.

In January 1812, Devonshire took command of the 64-gun HMS St Albans and served in support of those under siege at Cádiz until French forces were forced to withdraw following defeat at Salamanca in July. Re-assigned to North America in the 74-gun HMS Albion in February 1813, Devonshire was on blockade duty off Providence, Rhode Island, when, on 5 December, USS President escaped to sea. Devonshire later transferred to HMS Sceptre serving in the English Channel but was forced to resign his commission due to ill health. He was forced out of retirement in order to qualify for an additional promotion and in January 1829, he took command of HMS Kent, a guardship on the Hamoaze at Plymouth. Devonshire retired a Rear-Admiral on 22 July 1830. He was nominated for the Knights Grand Cross of the Royal Guelphic Order in January 1835 and died early in 1839.

== Early life and career ==
Born in Cornwall in 1774, John Ferris Devonshire joined the Royal Navy in 1788, as a volunteer aboard the guardship, HMS Cumberland, at Plymouth. He became a midshipman in 1789 and after served on the North American station at Halifax in HMS Penelope, then HMS Trusty and HMS Queen in the West Indies.

In 1794, Devonshire, who had been commanding various small vessels and co-operating with a Spanish brig in curbing piracy in the waters around Puerto Rico, was rewarded for his conduct when John Jervis promoted him to acting ninth lieutenant aboard the flagship, HMS Boyne. Since the beginning of that year, Boyne and the other ships in Jervis's fleet, had been supporting troops under Charles Grey in the capture of the French Islands of Martinique, St Lucia and Guadeloupe. In June a French force landed on Guadeloupe and by September had retaken much of the island, leaving the British forces penned in at Fort Matilda on the southern end of Basse-Terre.

Jervis resigned at the end of November and on doing so promoted Devonshire to full lieutenant aboard HMS Terpsichore. Under Captain Richard Bowen, Terpsichore was, at that point, employed in the defence and support of the garrison at Fort Matilda (now Fort Delgrès). Devonshire was responsible for communication between the fort and ships, and the transport of supplies; a role he maintained until the troops were evacuated at the end of December.

Terpsichore then spent some time in the North Sea. In December 1795, John Jervis went to the Mediterranean as Commander-in-Chief, and Terpsichore followed shortly after.

== Mahonesa ==
"I am unwilling to speak of the particular conduct of any of the officers; but the talents displayed by my first-lieutenant, Devonshire, who was but just out of the sick list, added to his uncommon fatigue in taking care of the prise, and the very able manner in which he conducted and prepared to defend her, entitle him to this distinction, and prove him highly deserving of the recommendation you gave him with his appointment in the West Indies".

— Captain Bowen's official report to Sir John Jervis, of the capture of a Spanish frigate, Mahonesa.

In early October 1796 the British squadron under Sir John Man was chased into Gibraltar by a Spanish fleet. Terpsichore was sent to carry news to Jervis, and having met with HMS Pallas of Jervis's fleet on 10 October, set off on the return journey to Gibraltar.

Terpsichore was off Cartagena on 13 October, when, at first light, a frigate was seen to windward, clearing for action and preparing to chase. Bowen was not keen to engage, knowing the Spanish fleet was near and having 30 of his crew in the infirmary and many more weakened by sickness, including Devonshire. Nevertheless, Bowen's sense of duty and belief in his men, compelled him to fight. At 09:30, the two frigates were within hailing and distance and Bowen ordered a gun fired to test the enemy's resolve, which was answered with a full broadside. After a close action lasting an hour and twenty-five minutes, the Spanish ship attempted to disengage. She was pursued by Terpsichore for a further 20 minutes before surrendering.

The Spanish frigate, turned out to be the Mahonesa. Her masts and most of her rigging had been badly damaged by Terpsichore's fire, several of the guns had been put out of action and many of her crew killed and wounded. Terpsichore had four wounded. Devonshire was mentioned in dispatches for his part in the battle.

Mahonesa was towed to Gibraltar where she was repaired and taken into service. She was recommissioned by Devonshire who had been promoted to Commander by the Admiralty, on the strength of Jervis's commendation. He held the command for 4 months before being replaced by a post captain and sent back to England with dispatches.

== Copenhagen ==
In July 1800, Devonshire was given command of His Majesty's Sloop Dart. In 1801 Dart was part of the British force sent to break up the League of Armed Neutrality and in April, she fought at the Battle of Copenhagen. Dart's role was to co-operate with HMS Amazon and a variety of frigates and sloops at the northern end of the Danish line. Due to HMS Bellona and HMS Russell going aground early in the battle, she drew more fire from the Trekroner Fort than was intended and was badly mauled by the end of the action, having been subjected to heavy fire for three hours. Devonshire was appointed acting captain of HMS Alcmene after the battle. His promotion was confirmed on 27 April and he took command of HMS Glatton until hostilities ceased in 1802, and she paid off.

== Later career and death ==
In January 1812, Devonshire commissioned HMS Armada in which he sailed for Cádiz; under siege from French forces since February 1810. After escorting a merchant convoy for part of its journey, Devonshire arrived at Cádiz where he took command of 64-gun HMS St Albans. He and his ship served, in particular, in support of the garrison on the Isla de Leon, until the French were forced to withdraw after their defeat at the Battle of Salamanca in July.

St Albans was paid off in February 1813 and Devonshire was re-assigned to the 74-gun HMS Albion. On 5 December, while Albion was on blockade duty off Providence, Rhode Island, USS President put to sea. She was seen by Devonshire's crew but Albion was too far away to prevent her escape. In January 1814, Devonshire was in command of a small squadron, comprising Albion, a frigate and a sloop, which menaced enemy shipping off the Nantucket Shoals and took many prizes.

Ill-health compelled Devonshire to seek employment nearer home, and he later transferred to HMS Sceptre and returned to England. He served in the Channel for a while but his health did not improve and he resigned his commission.

In order to gain a promotion, Devonshire was obliged to seek a further appointment and in January 1829, he took command of HMS Kent, serving as a guardship on the Hamoaze, Plymouth. Devonshire retired a rear-admiral on 22 July 1830, he was nominated a Knights Commander of the Royal Guelphic Order in January 1835, and died early in 1839.

== Family ==
Devonshire had two younger brothers, who followed him into the navy. The first, Henry, was born in 1775 and rose to the rank of lieutenant. Richard, born in 1784, eventually became a rear-admiral like his oldest brother but Henry failed to appear on the Navy List after 1804.
