= Francis Fane (Royal Navy officer) =

British Royal Navy officer

Rear-Admiral Francis Fane
- Born: 14 October 1778
- Died: 28 March 1844 (aged 65)
- Military career
- Allegiance: United Kingdom
- Branch: Royal Navy
- Rank: Rear-Admiral
- Conflicts: French Revolutionary Wars; Capture of Mahonesa; Engagement with Vestale; Napoleonic Wars; Battle of Palamós

Rear-Admiral Francis William Fane (14 October 1778 – 28 March 1844) son of John Fane (1751–1824) was a British Royal Navy officer of the French Revolutionary and Napoleonic Wars who served in several engagements while commissioned on the frigate HMS Terpsichore, including the blockade of Alexandria. There he was commended for rescuing five French soldiers from a group of Bedouin partisans, despite coming under fire from the people he was trying to rescue. He advanced rapidly through the ranks, and by 1810 was in command of his own frigate, participating in the Peninsular War. It was during this campaign that he was captured during an operation at Palamós, remaining a prisoner for the remainder of the war. After the peace of 1815, Fane did not continue in active service, and although he was promoted to admiral in 1837 he did not serve again at sea.

== Life ==
Francis William Fane entered the Royal Navy on 15 April 1795 as a young midshipman, and rapidly impressed his superiors with his service during the French Revolutionary Wars aboard the frigate HMS Terpsichore. On 24 October 1796, Terpsichore was cruising near Cartagena, Spain, when she encountered the Spanish frigate Mahonesa. Engaging the enemy directly, Captain Richard Bowen was able to defeat and capture the Spanish ship, despite his own vessel taking serious damage. Two months later, after hasty repairs at Gibraltar, Bowen was again cruising the Spanish coast, when on 12 December he sighted and chased the French frigate Vestale. In a fierce engagement, the French ship was forced to surrender, although Fane was badly wounded in the exchange of cannon fire. During the night however the ships became separated and by morning the French crew had overpowered the British sailors placed aboard their ship and taken it into Cadiz.

Bowen was killed during the Battle of Santa Cruz de Tenerife in 1797, and was replaced by Captain William Hall Gage. In May 1798, Terpsichore was attached to the squadron under Rear-Admiral Sir Horatio Nelson that participated in the Mediterranean Campaign of 1798, but were separated from the main squadron in late May and did not return until mid-August, by which time Nelson had already defeated the French at the Battle of the Nile off Egypt. Attached to the squadron under Sir Samuel Hood ordered to blockade Alexandria, Terpsichore assisted in the destruction of French vessels entering or leaving the port. On 2 September, a squadron including Terpsichore drove the cutter Anémone ashore, but as the French survivors scrambled onto the beach they were intercepted by Bedouin partisans. As the British watched from beyond the heavy surf, the Bedouins began massacring the survivors, and desperate attempts to reach the beach by boat were driven back under fire from the French. In desperation, Lieutenant Fane dived into the sea with an empty barrel tied to a rope and swam ashore, dragging five French soldiers back to the ships, the only survivors of the massacre.

Fane's promotion was one of the fastest in the fleet, and by 1804 he had been made a post captain, taking over the 28-gun frigate HMS Hind. By 1810 he was in command of the frigate HMS Cambrian and was actively supporting the Spanish war effort against the French in the Peninsula War, attacking French coastal positions. Once such raid ended in disaster however at Palamós, when a British amphibious assault on 13 December 1810 was forced to retreat in confusion. Fane, who was leading a boarding party, became cut off at the town's mole and was eventually forced to surrender.

Fane remained a prisoner for the rest of the war, and did not return to active service once it ended. Despite remaining in reserve and receiving a promotion to rear-admiral in 1837, Fane did not serve again and died on 28 March 1844 at Bath. He was survived by his wife, Anne née Flint, who remarried Lord Thomond in 1847.

== Family ==
Fane was the youngest son of John Fane (1751–1824) and Lady Elizabeth, daughter of Thomas Parker, 3rd Earl of Macclesfield, in 1773.
