= Admiral Bowen =

Admiral Bowen may refer to:

- Harold G. Bowen Sr. (1883–1965), U.S. Navy Vice admiral
- James Bowen (Royal Navy officer) (1751–1835), British Royal Navy rear admiral
- John Bowen (Royal Navy officer) (1780–1827), British Royal Navy rear admiral
