= Robert Thorp (priest) =

British clergyman (1736-1812)

Robert Thorp (1736 – 20 April 1812) was a British clergyman.

== Life ==
Thorp attended Durham School and Peterhouse, Cambridge University, obtaining a B.A. in 1758 as senior wrangler and an M.A. in 1761. In 1768 he succeeded his father Thomas Thorp (1699–1767) as rector of Chillingham; in 1782 he became rector of Gateshead; in 1792 he became archdeacon of Northumberland. In 1795, he became rector of Ryton, and he is buried in the vault of the church there. He was author of Excerpta quædam e Newtoni Principiis Philosophiæ Naturalis, 1765 and translated Newton's Principia.

== Family ==
Thorp married Grace Alder, daughter of William Alder of Horncliffe-on-Tweed. Their youngest son Charles Thorp also became rector of Ryton and was a founder of Durham University.

Another son, George Thorp, became first lieutenant of the frigate HMS Terpsichore soon after turning 19 years-of-age and was killed six months later alongside his captain, Richard Bowen, during the assault on Santa Cruz, Tenerife, led by Nelson, on 25 July 1797.
