= George Thorp (Royal Navy officer) =

British Royal Navy officer (1777–1797)

- Born: 9 September 1777; Chillingham, Northumberland
- Died: 25 July 1797 (aged 19); Santa Cruz de Tenerife, Tenerife, Canary Islands
- Military career
- Allegiance: Kingdom of Great Britain
- Branch: Royal Navy
- Service years: 1790–1797
- Rank: Lieutenant
- Conflicts: French Revolutionary Wars; Battle of Santa Cruz de Tenerife †

George Thorp (9 September 1777 – 25 July 1797) was an officer of the Royal Navy who saw service during the French Revolutionary Wars. His short, but distinguished, career culminated in service as first lieutenant of the frigate HMS Terpsichore and his death, aged 19, at the side of his commanding officer, Captain Richard Bowen, in the assault on Santa Cruz, Tenerife.

== Family and early life ==
George Thorp was born on 9 September 1777, the fourth son of Dr Robert Thorp MA, DD, Rector of Ryton from 1781 to 1795, Archdeacon of Northumberland from 1792 to 1806, a distinguished mathematician (senior wrangler at Cambridge in 1758) and Latin scholar. His younger brother Charles Thorp also became rector of Ryton and later Archdeacon of Durham and a founder of Durham University.

In 1788, Pooley Onslow, a first cousin of George's and daughter of his father's sister Jane, married Rear Admiral Sir Francis Samuel Drake, 1st Baronet, brother of Sir Francis Henry Drake, 5th Baronet and last in the line of baronets descended from Sir Francis Drake, 1st Baronet, nephew of the Elizabethan naval hero Sir Francis Drake. In the year following his marriage, Sir Samuel (as he was known) was appointed a junior lord of the admiralty, though dying shortly afterwards. The marriage likely gave Lady Drake the ear of many senior naval officers in addition to those of other distinguished persons known to her father, George Onslow, Member of Parliament and an ex-army officer and her grandfather, Lieutenant-General Richard Onslow. Surviving correspondence between George and his family makes clear the patronage he received from Lady Drake throughout his short career.

== Enlistment at Portsmouth ==
Thorp joined the Royal Navy in Portsmouth in February 1790, aged 12, and served in the following ships:

Ships in which served
Ship	Period served	Commanding officer
Thisbe	23 January 1790 – 17 July 1791	Captain Rupert George
Magnificent	18 July 1791 – 15 November 1791	Captain George Cranfield Berkeley
Juno	16 November 1791 - February / March 1794	Captain Samuel Hood
Aigle	February / March 1794 - March / April 1796	Captain Samuel Hood
Victory	April 1796 - 7 May 1796	Captain Gray and Captain Robert Calder
Terpsichore	8 May 1796 – 24 July 1797	Captain Richard Bowen

For his arrival at Portsmouth, Lady Drake provided George with several letters of introduction. Dr Thorp, who accompanied his young son, wrote to his wife in Gateshead "George has got a letter from Lord Hood to his Captain which cannot fail to procure him a good reception... Lady Drake has also got him letters to Capt. Onslow & Adm. Roddam..." (Vice-Admiral Robert Roddam, Commander-in-Chief at Portsmouth). "Roddam will have to introduce him to the several officers of the ship."

== HMS Thisbe ==
Most of Thorp's period on his first ship, the 28-gun Enterprise-class sixth-rate frigate HMS Thisbe was spent in Nova Scotia, for which the frigate sailed in March 1790, returning to England in July of the following year. Correspondence from Thorp to his family during this time seems to have been lost or perhaps there was none, so little is known of his activities, but the ship was at Nova Scotia during the Nootka Crisis. It was feared that war might be declared with Spain and Thorp's captain, Rupert George, was foremost among captains of other ships in an unsuccessful attempt to obtain authority to press local men into service to make up the difference between ships' peacetime and wartime complements, suggesting that Thisbe may have been maintained in a state of preparedness for action that provided good training for Thorp.

On Thisbe's return to England in July 1791, Thorp transferred to the ship-of-the-line Magnificent.

== HMS Juno ==
On 16 November 1791, Thorp reported on board the frigate HMS Juno (32 guns), under the command of Captain Samuel Hood, a cousin once removed of Lord Hood and later to become Vice-Admiral Sir Samuel Hood, 1st Baronet. Throughout 1792, Juno was based at Weymouth in attendance on the King and frequently embarked members of the Royal Family. Early in 1793 she joined the Mediterranean Fleet under Lord Hood. The Juno later took part in some notable events during the time Thorp served in her.

=== Escape from Toulon ===
In a letter to his family, Thorp gives a vivid account of the Juno's night-time arrival in Toulon on 11 January 1794 with a contingent of army onboard numbering half as many again as the ship's company, to provide urgently needed assistance for the occupying force under the command of Lord Hood, only to discover after anchoring that the English fleet had vacated Toulon, which was now under French occupation, escaping under point-blank fire from ships and shore batteries.

=== Attack on the tower and redoubt at Mortella Bay, Corsica ===
On 7 February 1794, Juno, in company with the ship-of-the-line Fortitude (74 guns), carried out an attack on the tower at Mortella Point, Corsica. The tower held out at first because of its robust design, inflicting heavy damage on the Fortitude with red-hot shot and causing the ships to withdraw temporarily. As the tower's two 18-pounder guns could only fire in a seaward direction a scheme was hatched to attack it from the landward side, involving almost inhuman effort in landing and hauling ship's guns and ammunition up the steep terrain to a point behind and overlooking the tower, from which a successful bombardment was mounted. Thorp was ashore and one of the party involved throughout the successful attack and wrote a detailed account of the action to his parents.

The sailors had all the hard work to do in getting the guns up the most incredible precipices but the worst was to come [as] we (the sailors) had to get the guns back again & to convey them by water over the other bay & after that to get the guns up a place which we could scarcely walk up... We were 3 days getting the guns up.

A dramatic account of what Thorp described as "the worst was to come" is given in William James' The Naval History of Great Britain, Vol. 1

The next post to be attacked was the Convention redoubt, mounted with 21 pieces of heavy ordnance, and considered as the key of San-Fiorenzo. By the most surprising exertions of science and labour, on the part of the officers and men of the navy, several 18-pounders and other pieces were placed on an eminence of very difficult ascent, 700 feet above the level of the sea. This rocky elevation, owing to its perpendicularity near its summit, was deemed inaccessible; but the seamen, by means of blocks and ropes, contrived to haul up the guns, each of which weighed about 42 hundred weight. The path along which these dauntless fellows crept would, in most places, admit but one person at a time. On the right was a descent of many hundred feet; and one false step would have led to eternity: on the left, were stupendous overhanging rocks, which occasionally served as fixed points for the tackle employed in raising the guns. From these 18-pounders, so admirably posted, a cannonade was unremittingly kept up during the whole of the 16th and 17th.

== HMS Aigle ==
When Captain Hood transferred from the Juno to the bigger frigate HMS Aigle (38 guns) in March 1794 he took with him a contingent of officers and men that included Midshipman Thorp.

=== Corsica ===
Between April and August 1795, Aigle took part in the blockade of Corsica and the capture of Calvi.

=== Smyrna ===
Aigle spent six months from May to October 1795 blockading French warships in the Turkish port of Smyrna (now İzmir) – a very unpopular operation because of its lack of opportunity for prizes and its unhealthy climate, with frequent outbreaks of the plague.

== HMS Victory ==
Thorp was transferred to Sir John Jervis' flagship HMS Victory in April 1796, where he was to sit the lieutenants' examination.

=== Promotion to lieutenant ===
Thorp's seniority as lieutenant was 1 May 1796, at which time he would have been 18 years and 7 months old, having enlisted the aid of his sister Jane to obtain documents asserting that he was over 20 years old, the minimum age for candidates sitting the lieutenants' examination.

== HMS Terpsichore ==
On 8 May 1796, almost immediately after his promotion, Thorp joined the frigate HMS Terpsichore (32 guns) under the command of Captain Richard Bowen, as third lieutenant. He served in her during the capture of the Spanish frigate Mahonesa (34 guns) and the capture, then loss in heavy weather, of the French frigate Vestale (36 guns), though he was in command of a prize being sailed to Gibraltar at the time of the latter action. On rejoining Terpsichore, Thorp was appointed as the first lieutenant, though (presumably unbeknownst to his shipmates) little more than 19 years old and still under the minimum age for lieutenant. It was in that capacity that he served during the Terpsichore's solo encounter on 1 March 1797 with the partially disabled Spanish ship-of-the-line Santisima Trinidad (136 guns), largest warship afloat at that time, which was retreating from the Battle of Cape St Vincent. Terpsichore's subsequent 10-hour engagement from early afternoon until dark resulted in 9 killed and several seriously injured on the Santisima Trinidad but no serious injuries on the Terpsichore.

=== Cutting Out of the Principe Fernando ===
In April 1797 Sir John Jervis sent the Terpsichore together with the Dido (28 guns) to reconnoitre off Tenerife, where they found the Cadiz-bound Philippine frigates Principe Fernando and El Principe d'Asturia in the Bay of Santa Cruz. On the night of 17/18 April a joint cutting out expedition was mounted by the two British frigates, each sending three boats of which those from the Terpsichore were under the command of Thorp. In correspondence to his family, Thorp says that Captain Bowen (who was in command of the expedition) told him that he had drawn lots with the captain of Dido as to whose boats should attempt to take the closer of the two frigates to the shore and batteries and that Terpsichore had drawn the short straw. Despite adverse weather, which caused the boats to be rowed for more than three hours longer than anticipated before reaching their quarries, Terpsichore's boats' crews successfully boarded and captured their frigate, the Principe Fernando, sailing and towing her to sea while under fire from shore batteries for two hours, without loss of life but with the loss of 10 lives of the Philippine frigate's crew. Dido's crews were unsuccessful.

=== Battle of Santa Cruz, Tenerife ===
In July 1797, Terpsichore became part of the squadron under Rear-Admiral Nelson that sought to invade Tenerife and capture Santa Cruz, which was being used as a port of refuge by richly laden ships from the West Indies and beyond bound for Spain. On the night of 24 July, following unsuccessful attempts to land troops some distance from the town, Nelson led a full-frontal assault on Santa Cruz under cover of darkness in which Terpsichore's role was to land a party on the town's mole and neutralise the battery overlooking the waters to the mole's north-east in which direction the main force would head.

Thorp must have known the danger likely to be faced through his prior acquaintance of the mole when cutting out the Philippine frigate Principe Fernando three months earlier and wrote a letter addressed to "My ever dear Parents, Brothers & Sister" saying:

Going to storm Sta. Cruz (Teneriffe). As I think there is a chance of my never returning I leave this directed to you expressing my gratitude and affection and the very high sense I have of your care and concern for me, and also to Lady Drake...

In the subsequent action Terpsichore's boat sustained a direct hit from the battery and capsized in the heavy swell, several crew members drowning, but some of the party got ashore, took the mole battery, spiked its six 24-pounder guns and were progressing towards the town when they were mown down by grapeshot fired from a cannon that had been relocated from one of the town's forts for that purpose earlier in the day. Thorp was one of those killed at the side of his captain, Richard Bowen. After the cessation of the action, their bodies were recovered and buried at sea off Tenerife on 27 July.

== Retrospect ==
Thorp seems never to have returned home to Northumberland nor to have seen his parents again after bidding his father farewell in Portsmouth in February 1790, aged 12, spending all his time abroad save for his time in the Magnificent and the first year of his time in the Juno, waiting on the Royal Family, followed by a short period in the English Channel. He is mentioned with affection and respect in correspondence from several senior officers:

In a letter dated 16 August 1797 to his sister, Captain Cuthbert Collingwood (later Vice-Admiral Cuthbert Collingwood, 1st Baron Collingwood), close friend of Nelson and at that time captain of the ship-of-the-line Excellent as part of Sir John Jervis' squadron blockading Cadiz, wrote: "Capt. Bowen of Terpsichore and his first Lieut poor Thorp were both killed while they were spiking the guns in a battery which they had got possession of."

In a letter dated 31 August 1797 to J E Blackett Esq, his father-in-law and a former Mayor of Newcastle upon Tyne, also written aboard the Excellent, Captain Collingwood wrote: "Captain Bowen was killed, and his First Lieutenant, Thorpe, for whom I was very sorry: he was a fine young man, and promised to be an excellent officer."

The early career of Admiral of the Fleet Sir William Hall Gage mirrored that of Thorp almost identically. Gage was born three weeks after Thorp in 1777 and joined the Royal Navy in 1789, three months before Thorp. Thereafter their careers followed similar courses until April 1796 when they were together as midshipmen on board Admiral Sir John Jervisʼ flagship HMS Victory, Thorp waiting to take the Lieutenantʼs examination and Gage having just passed it and awaiting promotion. Both were only 18 years old and would not have been eligible to sit the Lieutenantʼs examination in the ordinary course until having turned 20 years of age, but in one case at least (Thorp) the date of birth is known to have been falsified to establish premature eligibility. Gage was known to Thorpʼs family, as in a letter to his sister Jane dated 18 April 1796 Thorp wrote: “Hall is likewise in Victory & has passed & I hope will soon be promoted. He is very well & desires me to remember him to you and all at Goswick.” Both men then served as lieutenants in ships of the Mediterranean Squadron under Sir John Jervis, sharing another coincidence in two unrelated events off Santa Cruz in Teneriffe with Thorp successfully cutting-out the Philippine frigate Principe Fernando overnight 17/18 April from Terpsichore and Gage leading the boats from HMS Minerve in company with those of HMS Lively in successfully cutting-out the French corvette Mutine on May 28. Thorp as First Lieutenant of Terpsichore was killed together with his captain, Richard Bowen, on 25 July 1797. The next day, in a remarkable twist of fate, Gage, who had been promoted to commander in June, was appointed captain of Terpsichore.

== Letters to his family ==
Thorp wrote numerous letters to his parents and siblings throughout his career, except for his time on Thisbe in Nova Scotia during his first year of service and his subsequent time on Magnificent. These were deposited in the National Maritime Museum in 1968 in the form of two letterbooks. Regrettably, no record of persons inspecting these letterbooks seems to have been kept by the National Maritime Museum but anyone studying them in detail who is familiar with the Aubrey–Maturin series of novels of Patrick O'Brian may find a remarkable coincidence between some of the descriptions in Thorp's letters and events or characters in O'Brian's novels, inviting speculation whether O'Brian may have read the letters and been inspired by their content. Thorp's letters describing the escape from Toulon, the attack on the Mortella Tower and the siege of Saint-Florent, the blockade of Corsica, the capture of Calvi and the cutting out of the Principe Fernando are particularly noteworthy. Dean King’s biography “Patrick O’Brian: A Life Revealed” provides support for this hypothesis through many mentions of assistance from Richard Ollard, O'Brian's publishing agent and a recipient of the Caird Medal from the National Maritime Museum, and by the Museum forwarding copies of documents and plans at O’Brian’s request.
