= Chillingham, Northumberland =

Village in Northumberland, England

Coordinates: 55.527°N 1.904°W

Chillingham
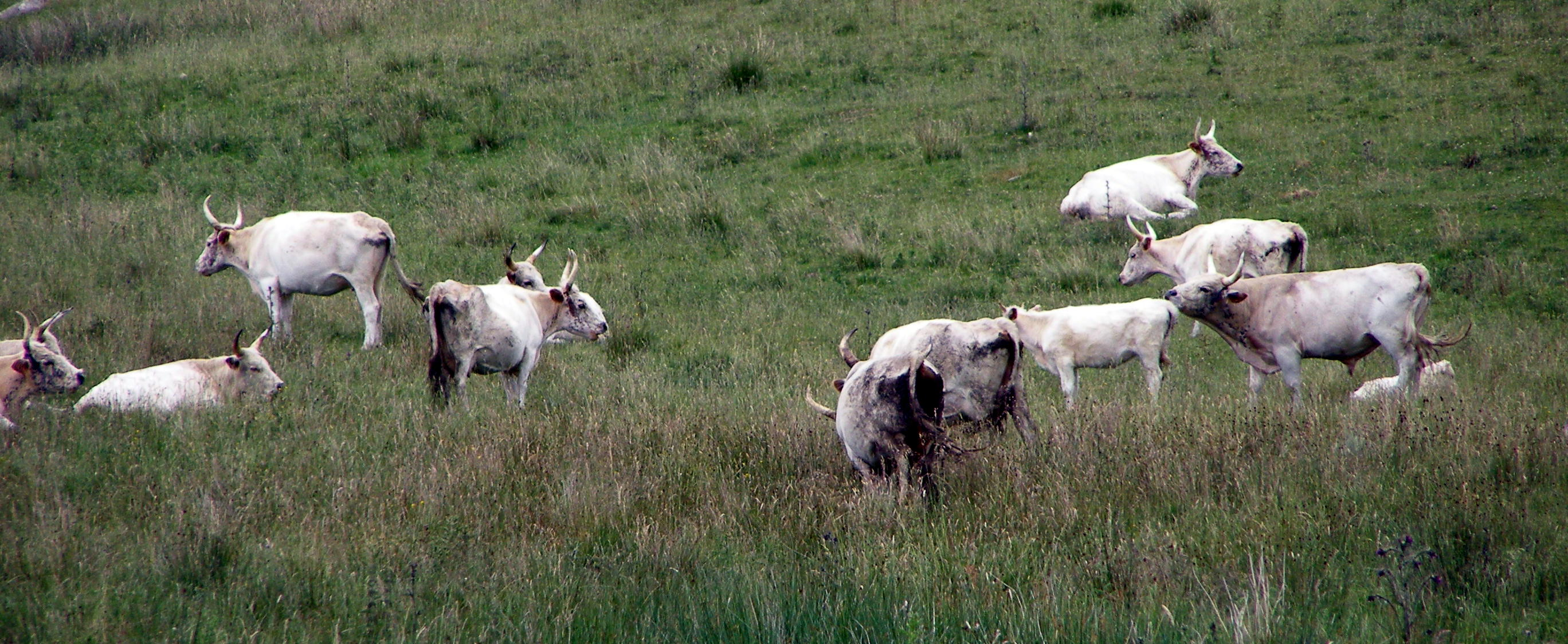
- Chillingham Cattle grazing

- Location within Northumberland
- Population: 50 (2001 census)
- OS grid reference: NU060259
- Unitary authority: Northumberland
- Ceremonial county: Northumberland
- Region: North East
- Country: England
- Sovereign state: United Kingdom
- Post town: ALNWICK
- Postcode district: NE66
- Dialling code: 01668
- Police: Northumbria
- Fire: Northumberland
- Ambulance: North East
- UK Parliament: North Northumberland

Chillingham is a village in Northumberland, England. It is situated approximately 6 km (3.7 mi) to the east of Wooler, south of Chatton. At the 2011 Census the population remained less than 100. Detailed information is included in the parish of Bewick.

Chillingham is famous for its castle, which is said to be haunted, and the Chillingham Cattle, a wild herd of roughly 90 individuals which has been kept in an enclosure since the Middle Ages and strictly inbreeding for at least 300 years. The village contains Hebborn bastle house, a fortified house near Hepburn Wood.

HMS Chillingham, a Ham class minesweeper, was named after the village.

The civil parish, along with those for Chatton and Lilburn, has been served by Tillside Parish Council since 2003, under a grouping order by the former Borough of Berwick-upon-Tweed. According to Tillside Parish Council, two councillors represent Chillingham on the council.

== Notable people ==
- George Thorp, a Royal Navy officer whose short but heroic career ended in his death aged 19 in the assault on Santa Cruz, Tenerife led by Nelson on 25 July 1797, was born in Chillingham on 9 September 1777. He was baptised on 7 October 1777 in the parish church, where his father Robert Thorp MA, DD (later Archdeacon of Northumberland) was rector as had earlier been his grandfather Thomas Thorp.
- The Irish composer Charles Villiers Stanford wrote a song titled "Chillingham", serenading the beauty and peace of the landscape.
- John Sandford (1832–1892), cricketer and judicial commissioner of Burma and Mysore.

== See also ==
- Bewick and Beanley Moors SSSI.
