= Action of 6 February 1799 =

- Part of the War of the Second Coalition
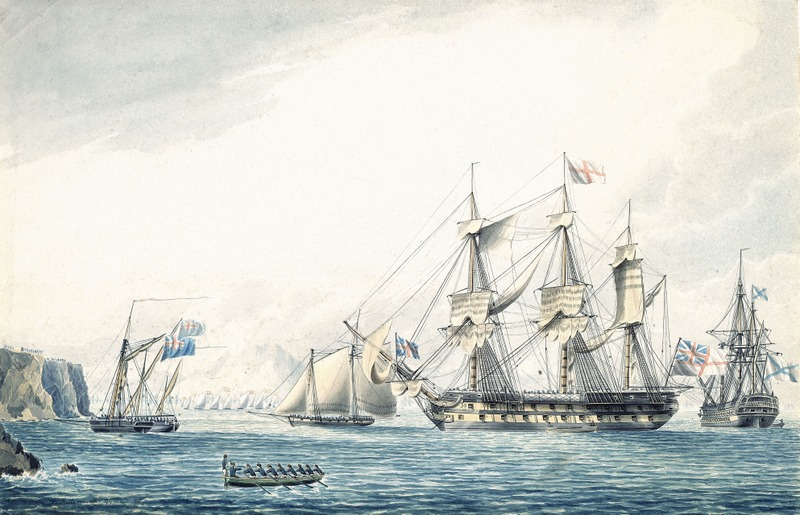
- Argo (second from right) in 1799
Date	6 May 1799
Location	Off Alcúdia, Mediterranean Sea
Result	British victory

Belligerents
United Kingdom	Spain

Commanders and leaders
(United Kingdom of Great Britain and Ireland) James Bowen	(Spain) Pablo Pérez

Strength
1 ship of the line 1 frigate	2 frigates

Casualties and losses
Unknown	530 captured 1 frigate captured

The action of 6 February 1799 was a minor naval action fought between the Royal Navy and Spanish Navy off Majorca during the War of the Second Coalition. A British naval force consisting of the ship of the line Leviathan and frigate Argo under Post-Captain James Bowen attacked the Spanish frigates Santa Theresa and Proserpine near Alcúdia, capturing the former.

== Background ==
By the end of 1798 the situation had changed in the Mediterranean with the destruction of the French fleet at Aboukir and the capture of the Spanish island of Menorca in November 1798 by British forces. The Royal Navy were using the island as a place to launch raids and conduct further operations.

== Battle ==
On 6 February 1799, the ship of the line Leviathan and frigate Argo under Post-Captain James Bowen surprised the Spanish frigates Santa Theresa and Proserpine, who were lying at anchor near Alcúdia. The Spanish frigates set sail with the British in pursuit but a violent westerly gale came up that took away Leviathan's main top-sail. After dark the Spanish frigates separated but Leviathan had fallen behind and saw neither the separation nor Argo's signal that she had chased the one to port.

Leviathan had nearly caught up with Argo, who had fired bow chasers damaging the Santa Theresa's smaller sails, slowing her down. More damage was inflicted but this time from the gale damaging more sails and rigging. At about midnight Argo got alongside the Santa Theresa and fired a broadside that wounded two men and badly damaged Santa Theresa's rigging.

At this point the Spanish captain of Santa Theresa Don Pablo Perez realized that further resistance was futile and after a conference with his men struck her colours. Santa Theresa was upwards of 950 tons burthen, carrying 42 guns plus coehorns and swivel guns and in addition to her crew of 280 seamen and marines, she had 250 soldiers on board. Santa Theresa had recently been completely refurbished and provisioned for a four-month cruise. Her consort Proserpine, which had escaped, though smaller, was equally well armed.

== Aftermath ==
The Santa Theresa was bought into British service and kept the name. Operations continued from Menorca, 16 February Argo and Leviathan attacked the town of Cambrils.
