= HMS Chillingham =

Minesweeper of the Royal Navy

History

United Kingdom
- Name: HMS Chillingham
- Namesake: Chillingham
- Builder: McLean, Renfrew
- Launched: 19 December 1952
- Completed: 17 June 1953
- Fate: Sold 1969 and converted to yacht, and re-named Mangusta, Non Stop, and Vana of Cranbourne. As of 2007 named Osprey.

General characteristics
- Class & type: Ham class minesweeper
- Type: Minesweeper
- Displacement: 120 long tons (122 t) standard; 164 long tons (167 t) full load
- Length: 100 ft (30 m) p/p; 106 ft 6 in (32.46 m) o/a
- Beam: 21 ft 4 in (6.50 m)
- Draught: 5 ft 6 in (1.68 m)
- Propulsion: 2 shaft Paxman 12YHAXM diesels; 1,100 bhp (820 kW)
- Speed: 14 knots (16 mph; 26 km/h)
- Complement: 2 officers, 13 ratings
- Armament: 1 × Bofors 40 mm Automatic Gun L/60 or Oerlikon 20 mm cannon
- Notes: Pennant number(s): M2617 / IMS17

HMS Chillingham was one of 93 ships of the Ham-class of inshore minesweepers.

Their names were all chosen from villages ending in -ham. The minesweeper was named after Chillingham in Northumberland.
