= Action of 13 October 1796 =

1796 battle of the War of the First Coalition

- Part of the War of the First Coalition
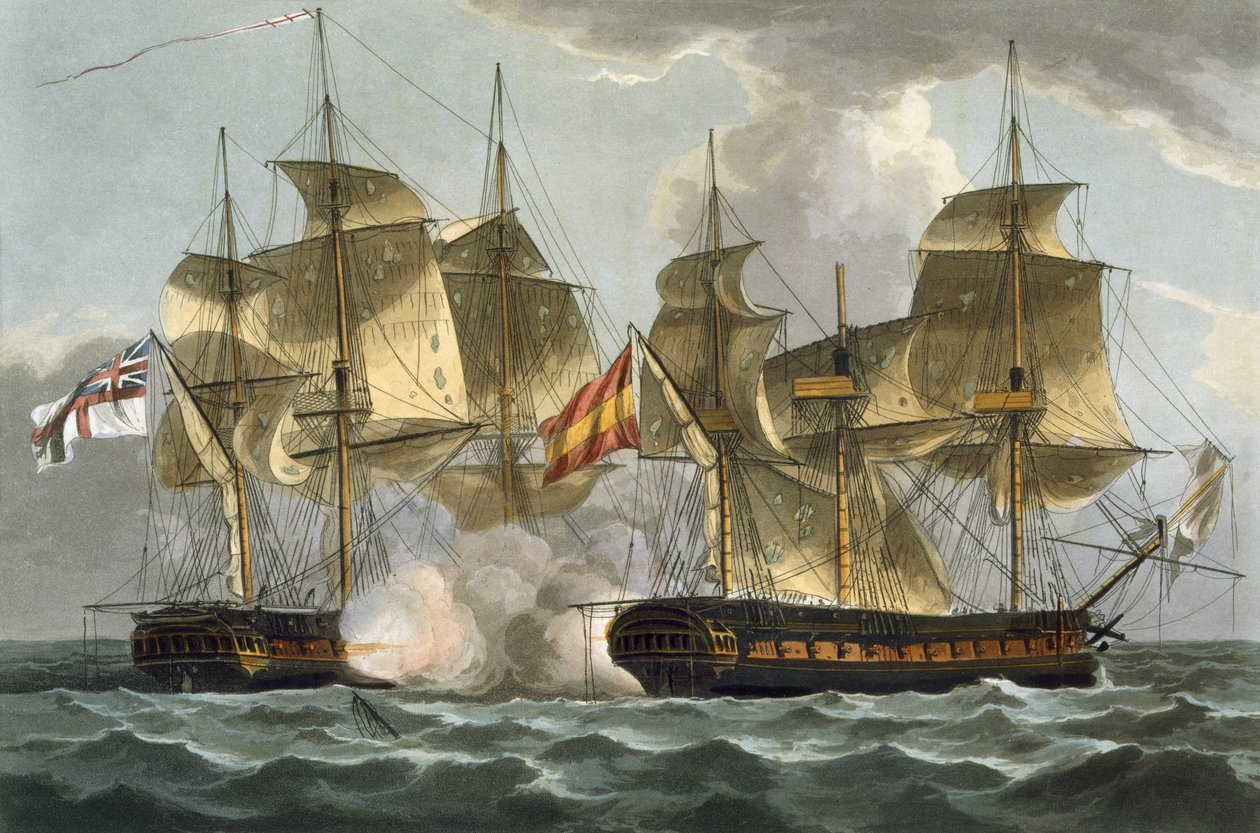
- 1816 illustration of the battle
Date	13 October 1796
Location	Off Cabo de Gata, Mediterranean Sea
Result	British victory

Belligerents
Great Britain	Spain

Commanders and leaders
Richard Bowen	Tomás de Ayalde (surrendered)

Strength
1 frigate	1 frigate

Casualties and losses
4 wounded	30 killed; 30 wounded; 250 captured; 1 frigate captured

The action of 13 October 1796 was a minor naval engagement of the War of the First Coalition, fought off the Mediterranean coast of Spain near Cartagena between the Royal Navy 32-gun frigate HMS Terpsichore under Captain Richard Bowen and the Spanish Navy 34-gun frigate Mahonesa under Frigate Captain Tomás de Ayalde. The action was the first battle of the Anglo-Spanish War, coming just eight days after the Spanish declaration of war. In a battle lasting an hour and forty minutes, Mahonesa was captured.

Spain had been an ally of Britain in the first years of the War of the First Coalition against the newly formed French Republic. Relations between the allies had often been strained, and following a series of defeats in the War of the Pyrenees the Spanish signed a peace treaty in August 1795. A year later the Treaty of San Ildefonso brought Spain back into the war, now as an ally of France. The war in the Mediterranean had reached a stalemate after two inconclusive battles in the spring of 1795, with a British blockade of the French naval base at Toulon maintained from San Fiorenzo and Leghorn under Vice-Admiral Sir John Jervis. The French dominance in the Italian campaign of 1796 made the British position tenuous, and with Spain's entry into the war Jervis was forced to disperse his limited forces further still, with forces watching Spanish shipping at Cádiz.

Off Cartagena Bowen commanded the small frigate Terpsichore, which had been shadowing a large Spanish fleet which had left Cádiz a few days earlier. As he returned to Gibraltar Bowen encountered Mahonesa, and the Spanish captain Ayalde offered battle. Bowen accepted and the ships fought an extended engagement at close quarters. The Spanish ship took much more serious damage and casualties than the British, and gradually the crew began to slip away from their guns. Ayalde made an attempt to escape, but his ship was too crippled and after a chase of 20 minutes he surrendered. Bowen brought the prize to Lisbon, where the damage was revealed to be too severe to repair. Bowen served in a number of engagements off Cádiz in the following months, until he was killed in July 1797 at the Battle of Santa Cruz.

== Background ==
In early 1793 Great Britain and Spain, historic antagonists in the Mediterranean, found themselves allies against the newly-formed French Republic in the War of the First Coalition. The alliance was uneasy, the Spanish refusing to allow British officers to command Spanish forces, and suspicious of British motives in the aftermath of the Nootka Crisis of 1790. During the Siege of Toulon, Spanish Admiral Juan de Lángara threatened to open fire on HMS Victory, the flagship of British Vice-Admiral Lord Hood during a dispute over strategy, and at the culmination of the siege Spanish forces were accused of deliberately sabotaging a British attempt to destroy the French Mediterranean Fleet at anchor in harbour.

As the war progressed the Spanish suffered a series of defeats on land in the War of the Pyrenees, and in the summer of 1795 Spain was forced to sign a peace treaty with the French, withdrawing their forces from the Mediterranean campaign. Britain and France fought inconclusive sea battles at Genoa and the Hyères Islands that year, the campaign settling into a stalemate, with the French blockaded in Toulon but sending successful raiding squadrons against British trade. One such squadron destroyed a large British convoy at the Battle of the Levant Convoy off Cape St. Vincent in October 1795 and took shelter in the main Spanish naval base of Cádiz. During 1796 the Italian campaigns of Napoleon Bonaparte systematically eliminated Britain's Italian allies, while diplomatic negotiations brought Spain into an alliance with France, signing the Treaty of San Ildefonso in August. On 5 October Spain declared war on Britain and a large Spanish fleet sailed from Cádiz under Lángara to unite with the French at Toulon.

British forces in the Mediterranean were commanded by Vice-Admiral Sir John Jervis, who had stationed forces off Cádiz to watch for Spanish movement in the advent of war. The squadron at Cádiz, commanded by Rear-Admiral Robert Mann, was chased by Lángara's fleet, abandoning two storeships in its precipitate withdrawal. Initially anchoring at Gibraltar, Mann then deserted his post and returned to Britain against orders. One of the independent commands in the region was a small force led by the small 32-gun frigate HMS Terpsichore under Captain Richard Bowen, recently transferred from the North Sea command at Jervis' request. Bowen recognised the danger in Mann's desertion, and set sail for the Ligurian Sea to warn Jervis of Lángara's approach.

== Action ==
On 11 October, Lángara reached the Spanish Mediterranean port of Cartagena, uniting with the squadron there and sailing in search of Jervis. The previous day Bowen, having passed Lángara's slower fleet, encountered HMS Pallas and passed the warning along, turning back to his station off Gibraltar. As Lángara passed by, a Spanish frigate stationed in Cartagena, the 34-gun Mahonesa under Frigate Captain Tomás de Ayalde, sailed independently on a patrol and in the early morning of 13 October sighted a strange sail to the northeast. Ayalde brought his frigate towards the stranger to investigate and found that he faced Bowen's frigate, manoeuvering to position Mahonesa in an advantageous station to windward.

Bowen's ship was undermanned, having landed 30 men for medical treatment at Gibraltar and with another 30 on board unfit for action, and he was concerned that the Spanish fleet he was shadowing might appear at any moment; a Spanish tender was seen sailing for Cartagena with news of Bowen's arrival. Bowen however determined to fight, and stood towards Ayalde's ship. At 09:30, Bowen pulled close alongside the Spanish frigate and fired a single shot to see how the Spanish vessel would react. Ayalde responded with a full broadside, and the frigates traded heavy fire for the next hour and twenty minutes as they wore around one another. Terpsichore's masts were badly damaged and the rigging, sails, boats and anchors badly torn up by Spanish fire, but casualties among the crew were relatively light. Mahonesa however was badly battered, suffering heavy casualties; the booms were shattered and the guns in the centre of the ship disabled.

As the action continued, Ayalde found that his men were slipping away from their guns and that fewer and fewer could be persuaded to return. Recognising that defeat was now inevitable, he ordered sails set and attempted to retreat to Cartagena. On Terpsichore, Bowen had his men effect rapid repairs and within 20 minutes the British frigate was under sail and soon overhauled the shattered Spanish ship. As Terpischore pulled alongside Mahonesa, gun batteries ready to fire, Ayalde struck his colours and surrendered.

=== Combatant summary ===
In this table, "Guns" refers to all cannon carried by the ship, including the maindeck guns which were taken into consideration when calculating its rate, as well as any carronades carried aboard. Broadside weight records the combined weight of shot which could be fired in a single simultaneous discharge of an entire broadside.

Ship	Commander	Navy	Guns	Tons	Broadside weight	Complement	Casualties		
Ship	Commander	Navy	Guns	Tons	Broadside weight	Complement	Killed	Wounded	Total
HMS Terpsichore	Captain Richard Bowen	Royal Navy	32	682bm	276 pounds (125 kg)	182	0	4	4
Mahonesa	Frigate Captain Tomás de Ayalde	Spanish Navy	34	921bm	180 pounds (82 kg)	275	30	30	60
Source: Clowes, p. 504

== Aftermath ==
Bowen effected repairs on board Terpsichore and his prize and turned to the westward. His losses were minimal, with only four men wounded in the engagement. Casualties on board Mahonesa were much heavier; Bowen estimated 30 killed and 30 wounded, Bowen successfully brought both frigates to Lisbon, where Jervis was establishing a new fleet anchorage. There Mahonesa was bought into the Royal Navy under the same name. (Note: Historian William James claimed that Mahonesa was deemed too badly shattered for further active service and never served as a warship, but the London Gazette reported how, on 24 May 1797, Mahonesa and HMS Romulus captured a 20-gun Spanish Corvette in a ruse de guerre. Approaching under false colours, Nuestra Senora del Rosario was taken without a shot being fired. In addition, Winfield, in the second volume of his British Warships in the Age of Sail series, claims that Mahonesa served until August 1798.) Bowen was commended for his victory, and awarded a piece of plate valued at 100 guineas. Naval historian William James considered that Mahonesa and Terpsichore, both 12-pounder frigates, were "as fair a match as an English officer would wish to fight." Bowen himself paid tribute to Ayalde's bravery in the action, considering that the Spanish captain had fought on long past the point where defeat was inevitable.

With Mann's desertion and the Spanish declaration of war, Jervis found his fleet isolated and outnumbered. Acting on orders from the Admiralty, he withdrew his forces from the Mediterranean entirely, retreating to Gibraltar and then Lisbon. There he received reinforcements from Britain and, in February 1797, launched a successful attack on the Spanish fleet at the Battle of Cape St Vincent, inflicting such a serious defeat that the Spanish fleet would not emerge again from Cádiz until the Croisière de Bruix campaign in 1799. Bowen was attached to the Cádiz blockade, capturing several merchant vessels in November 1796, defeating the French frigate Vestale off Cádiz at the action of 13 December 1796, and attacking the damaged Spanish 130-gun Santísima Trinidad in the aftermath of the Battle of Cape St. Vincent. In July 1797 Terpsichore was with the squadron under Rear-Admiral Sir Horatio Nelson which attacked the port of Santa Cruz on Tenerife. The operation was a failure, Nelson's force driven off with heavy casualties; Nelson lost an arm and Bowen was struck and killed by grape shot while storming the town. More than five decades after the battle the Admiralty recognised the action with a clasp attached to the Naval General Service Medal, awarded upon application to all British participants still living in 1847.
