= James Bowen (Royal Navy officer) =

French Royal Navy officer (1751–1835)

Rear-Admiral James Bowen
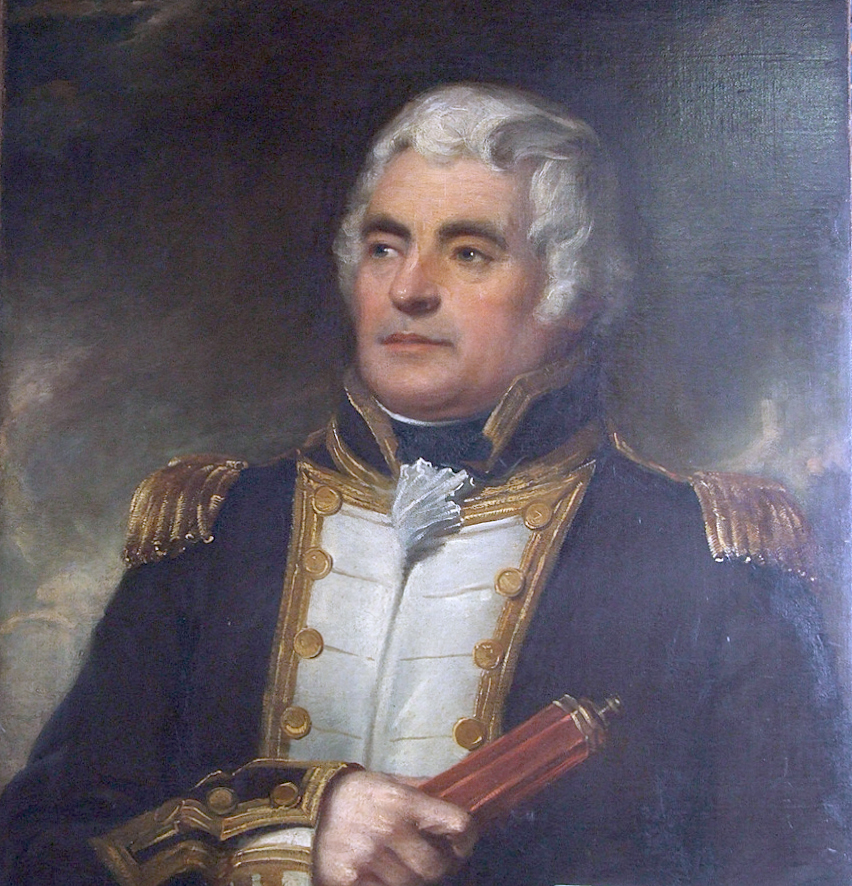
- Born: 1751; Ilfracombe, Devon
- Died: 27 April 1835 (aged 83–84); Ilfracombe, Devon
- Relatives: Richard Bowen (brother); John Bowen (son)
- Military career
- Allegiance: Great Britain; United Kingdom
- Branch: Royal Navy
- Service years: –1825
- Rank: Rear admiral
- Commands: HMS Thunderer; HMS Argo; HMS Dreadnought
- Conflicts: French Revolutionary Wars; Glorious First of June; Battle of Groix; Capture of Minorca (1798); Action of 6 February 1799; Napoleonic Wars

Rear-Admiral James Bowen (1751 – 27 April 1835) was a Royal Navy officer who served in the French Revolutionary and Napoleonic Wars.

== Family and early life ==
Bowen was born in Ilfracombe, Devon, in 1751. His father was a maritime trader who sailed from the Bristol Channel to West Africa and the West Indies. His younger brother, Richard Bowen, also embarked on a career at sea. James joined his father's ship in 1764 and commanded his own ship in the African and West India trade by 1776. He entered the Royal Navy as a master, serving aboard the 38-gun HMS Artois under Captain John MacBride. He followed MacBride to a succession of ships in the period 1781 to 1789 and saw action at the Battle of Dogger Bank on 5 August 1781. He was afterwards inspecting agent of transports in the Thames.

== French Revolutionary Wars ==
After the outbreak of war with France in 1793, Admiral Lord Howe asked Bowen to be master of his flagship, the 100-gun HMS Queen Charlotte. Howe commanded her at the Glorious First of June, 1794, when she engaged the French ship Montagne, the flagship of the French commander Rear-Admiral Louis Thomas Villaret de Joyeuse, and the Jacobin. During the battle Howe ordered Bowen to turn to starboard. Bowen warned him, 'My lord, you'll be foul of the French ship if you don't take care'. 'What is that to you, sir?’ replied the admiral, sharply; 'starboard!’ 'Starboard!’ cried Bowen, muttering by no means inaudibly, 'Damned if I care, if you don't. I'll take you near enough to singe your black whiskers'. Bowen then took Queen Charlotte across the stern of the Montagne, close enough for the French ensign hanging off her stern to brush the Queen Charlotte's main and mizzen shrouds.

Bowen distinguished himself during the battle and was commissioned a lieutenant on 23 June 1794. He continued to serve aboard Queen Charlotte as her first lieutenant, and was present at the Battle of Groix on 23 June 1795. A promotion to commander followed, and then an advancement to post captain on 2 September. He took command of the 74-gun Thunderer and served in the West Indies for a time, before taking command of the 44-gun Argo in March 1798. On 5 May she encountered Captain Sir Sidney Smith, who was in an open boat in the Channel, having escaped via Le Havre from the Temple prison in Paris. Argo sailed for the Mediterranean in October 1798.

In the Mediterranean Argo served with Commodore Duckworth. In November 1798 Argo participated in the reduction of Minorca where Argo supported the landing of British troops. When four or five Spanish vessels were spotted, the British squadron sailed to catch them. The Spaniards consisted of four frigates and a sloop. The four Spanish frigates - Flora, Casilda, Proserpine, and Pomona - had been on their way from Barcelona to Mahon with the payroll of eight million reales for the troops there when they encountered sloop-of-war Peterel and captured her on 12 November.

Argo was ordered to pursue the sloop and on 13 November she retook Peterel and her 72-man Spanish prize crew under the command of Don Antonio Franco Gandrada, Second Captain of Flora. Bowen put his own prize crew of 46 officers seamen and marines aboard.

On 29 September Argo captured Nostra Seniora de la Aldea.

On 22 November Argo captured the Spanish ship Virgin Solidad at sea. Virgin Solidad was carrying a cargo of rags to Barcelona. At some point Argo also captured Madona del Rosario.

On 6 February 1799, Argo and Leviathan surprised two Spanish frigates at anchor near the south point of the Bahia de Alcudia on Majorca. The Spanish set sail with the British in pursuit. A violent westerly gale came up that took away Leviathan's main top-sail. After dark the Spanish frigates separated but Leviathan had fallen behind and saw neither the separation nor Argo's signal that she chase the one to port. Leviathan had nearly caught up with Argo when Argo got alongside Santa Theresa about midnight. Argo fired a broadside that wounded two men and badly damaged Santa Theresa's rigging. At this point the Spaniard surrendered. She was of upwards of 950 tons burthen, carrying 42 guns plus coehorns and swivel guns. In addition to her crew of 280 seamen and marines under the command of Don Pablo Perez, she had 250 soldiers on board. Santa Theresa had recently been completely refurbished and provisioned for a four-month cruise. Her consort Proserpine, which had escaped, though smaller, was equally well-armed.

Then on 16 February Centaur, Argo, and Leviathan attacked the town of Cambrelles. Once the defenders had abandoned their battery, the boats went in. The British dismounted the guns, burnt five settees, and brought out another five settees or tartanes laden with wine and wheat. One tartan, Velon Maria, was a letter of marque, armed with one brass and two iron 12-pounders, and two 3-pounders. She had a crew of 14 men.

In May Argo sailed to Algiers to arrange with the Dey for a supply of fresh provisions for the British forces in Minorca. While there Bowen achieved the release of six British subjects that the Algerines had held as slaves for more than 14 years.

On 6 August Argo captured the Spanish sloop Infanta Amelia off Portugal. She was a packet ship that the Royal Navy took in as Porpoise. After her capture, Infanta Amelia took Earl St Vincent, who had been aboard Argo after resigning his command of the Mediterranean station, to Portsmouth, arriving there on 18 August.

In early 1800 Argo captured three privateers: Independente (1 March), San Antonio (2 March), and Arlequin (1 May). On 19 August 1800 Argo captured the Spanish lugger St Antonio in ballast. Argo sent her in to Plymouth.

On 21 October, after a 15-hour chase, Argo captured the Spanish letter of marque San Fernando, which was pierced for 22 guns but carried twelve long 6-pounders. She had a crew of 53 men. San Fernando was five days out of Santander and sailing to Vera Cruz with a cargo of iron bars and bale goods that belonged to the Royal Philippine Company. She was also carrying government dispatches but threw them overboard before the British boarded her.

Bowen also reported, but without giving further details, that during the same cruise he had captured four merchant vessels, two of which he sent in to port as prizes and two of which he sank. The two sent in were the French brig Maria Louisa, in ballast, and the Spanish barque Vincento, carrying iron ore. The vessels that were sunk were also Spanish barques carrying iron ore.

Argo and Carysfort escorted five transports carrying the 85th Regiment of Foot and forty artillerymen from Cowes on 24 June. They arrived in Portsmouth on 28 June and then sailed again on a "secret mission" to Madeira, which was occupied by the British at the request of the Portuguese. They had to put back into Torbay on 11 July.

In 1801 the East India Company gave Bowen 400 guineas for the purchase of plate in gratitude for his having escorted from St Helena to England ten vessels either belonging to the company or carrying its cargo. In January 1802 the British merchants of Madeira gave Captain Bowen a sword for his services.

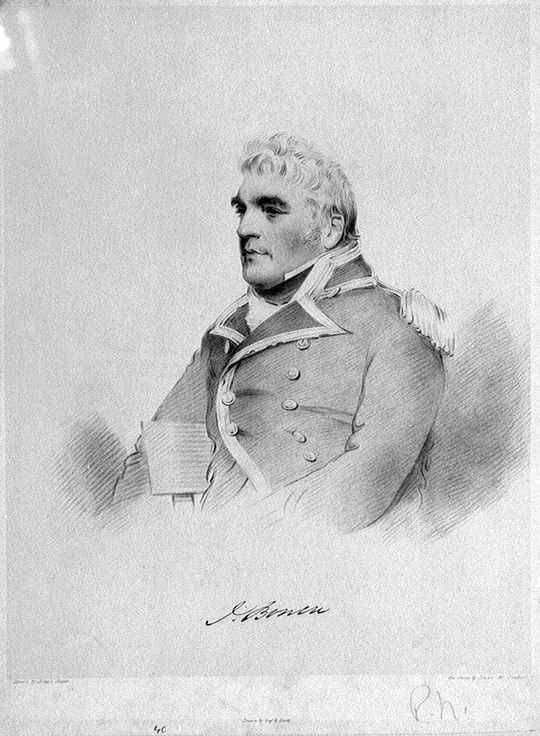
Captain James Bowen (1751-1835)}

In January 1809 after the Battle of Corunna, Peninsula war (1808 - 1814), Bowen led the transport fleet sent to secure the embarkation of the British Army led by General Sir John Moore; due to adverse weather conditions the fleet was a day later than expected. On 17 January morning most of the army had embarked. When French Marshall Soult perceived that the British had left the ridge he posted six guns on the heights above the southern end of the bay and by midday they were able fire upon the outlying ships. This caused panic amongst some of the transports until fire from the warships silenced the battery. Finally, on 18 January, the British rearguard embarked, the small Spanish garrison under General Alcedo faithfully holding the citadel until the fleet was well out to sea.

James Bowen served on the Navy Board from 25 February 1816 until 25 August 1825, when he retired with the rank of rear-admiral. He died on 27 April 1835.

== Family ==
James Bowen married a sister of Captain George Nicholas Hardinge and had two sons and four daughters. They followed their father into the navy. The eldest, James, died captain of the frigate, HMS Phoenix, on the East India station, in 1812; and another son, John, also a captain, died in 1828. Both sons had been promoted captain in 1805. James' promotion apparently was a mistake. John married the niece of the Duchess of Clarence. It is known the youngest daughter, Elizabeth, died in Torquay in 1894.

== Legacy ==
In 1860, Bowen Island near Vancouver was renamed after him, by Captain George Henry Richards, in recognition of his part in the June 1794 battle. The Australian surveyor Captain Matthew Flinders named Bowen strait, and Port Bowen after James Bowen during his circumnavigation of the continent. Flinders had met and been entertained by Bowen in Madeira. Another island in Jervis Bay was named Bowen in honour of his brother Richard.
