= John Bowen (Royal Navy officer) =

Royal Navy officer and colonial administrator (1780–1827)

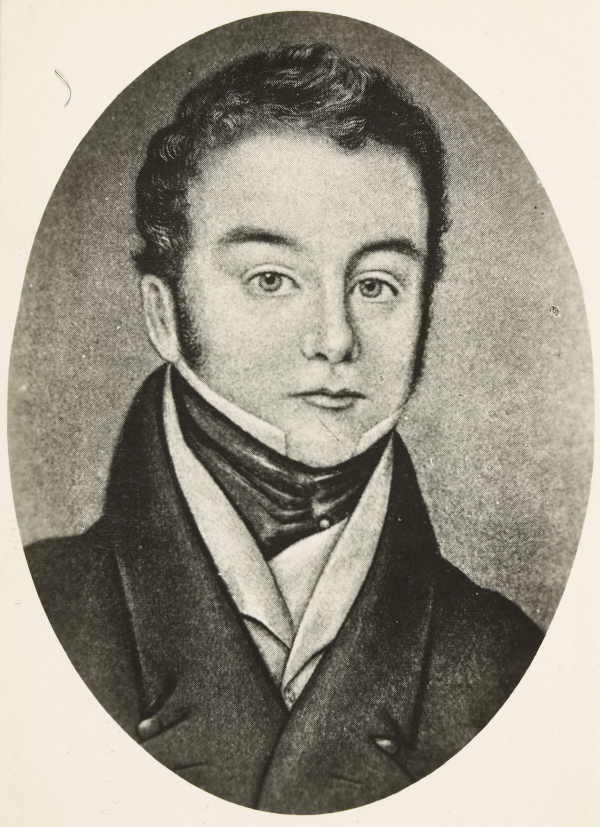
John Bowen (1780-1827)

Rear-Admiral John Bowen (baptised 14 February 1780 – 20 October 1827) was an English Royal Navy officer and colonial administrator, who led the first settlement of Tasmania at Risdon Cove.

== Early life and career ==
John Bowen was the son of James Bowen, and was born at Ilfracombe, Devon, England. He began his naval career in March 1794 and graduated from the Royal Naval College, Dartmouth. As a midshipman Bowen joined HMS Argo, which was commanded by his father. In April 1802 when as a lieutenant he joined HMS Lancaster at the Cape of Good Hope, South Africa. His next appointment was in HMS Glatton, carrying convicts to New South Wales. He arrived at Port Jackson on 11 March 1803. Governor King soon appointed him to form the new settlement at Risdon Cove, Van Diemen's Land. Peter Timms suggests that Bowen was chosen "because King could not spare anyone more experienced".

== Hobart settlement ==
The expedition left at the end of August, with Bowen commanding the Albion. He arrived at Risdon Cove on 12 September 1803. Among the original 49 settlers at Risdon Cove, which became Hobart, were 21 male and 3 female convicts, members of the New South Wales Corps and free settlers and their families.

In January 1804 Bowen, in Ferrett, left for Sydney so that he could return to the navy in the then current war against France, however Governor King told him to return to Risdon via the failing Port Phillip settlement and to resettle either at Hobart or Port Dalrymple, and requested Bowen to deliver administration of the Risdon settlement to David Collins.

In his two years in Tasmania Bowen explored the Richmond area, discovering coal and naming area the Coal River. In May 1804 he explored the Huon River. While at Risdon, Bowen lived with Martha Hayes, who bore him two daughters; Henrietta in 1804 (d. 1823), and Martha Charlotte in 1805.

== After Hobart ==
Bowen finally left Hobart in August 1804 on Ocean, and in January 1805 sailed for England in Lady Barlow. King paid him £100 to defray his expenses and recommended him for promotion. In May 1804 Bowen was promoted commander and in January 1806 he became captain. From 1806 to December 1809 he was in HMS Camilla, which in 1807-08 took part in the blockade of Martinique and Guadeloupe. In February 1811 he wrote to Robert Peel, Under-Secretary of State for War and the Colonies, suggesting that he should succeed Collins as Lieutenant-Governor of Van Diemen's Land. This was subsequently rejected as it was believed that as a naval officer he could not command troops.

In 1812-16 he served in HMS Salsette on the India Station.

Returning to England on 13 May 1825, he married Elizabeth Lindley Cloves. After a long illness he died at Ilfracombe in 1827, aged 47.
