= Spanish ship Nuestra Señora de la Santísima Trinidad =

Ship of the line, scuttled in 1805

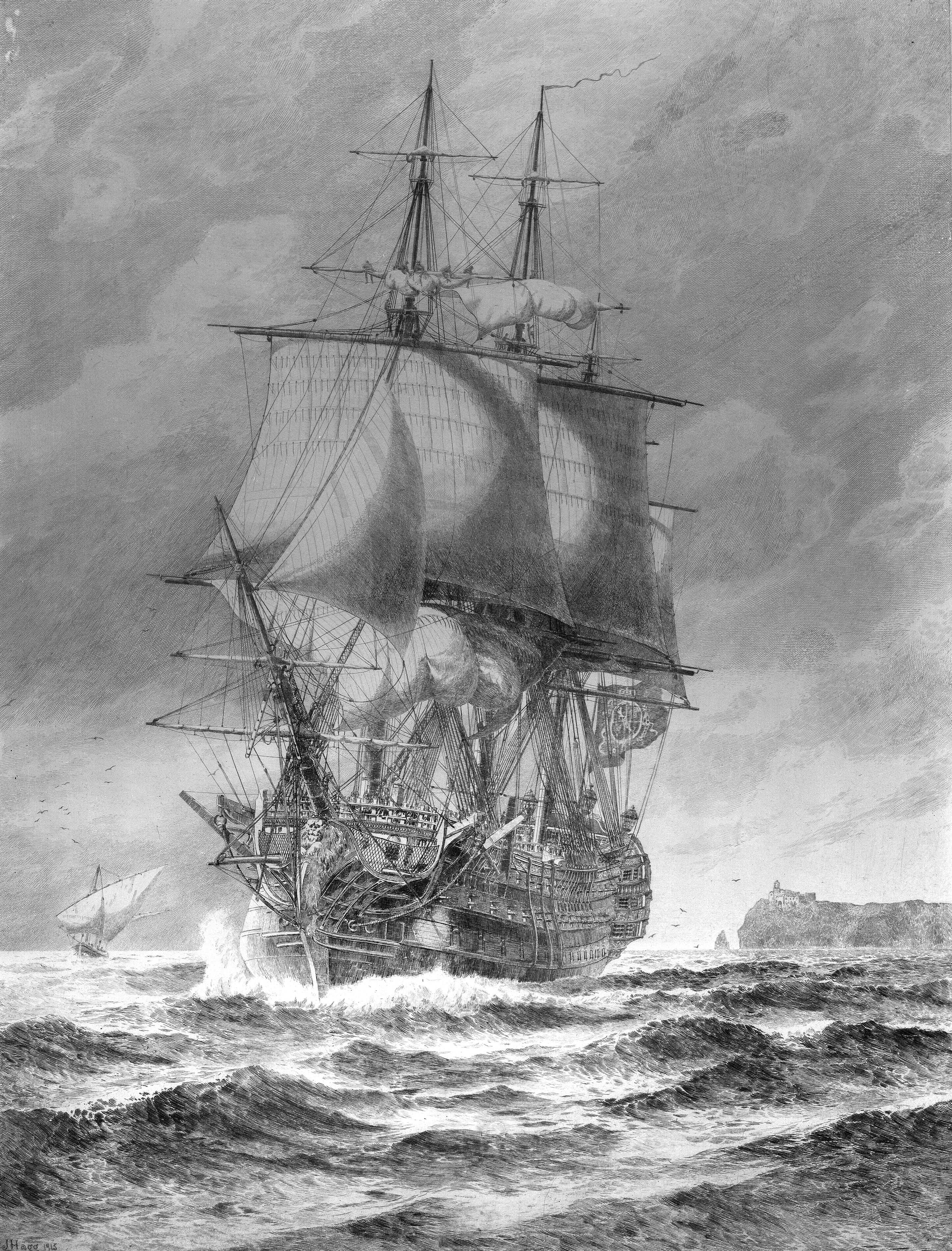
- 1913 illustration of Nuestra Señora de la Santísima Trinidad

History

Spain
- Name: Nuestra Señora de la Santísima Trinidad
- Namesake: the Holy Trinity
- Ordered: 23 October 1767
- Awarded: 12 March 1768
- Builder: Havana, Cuba
- Laid down: October 1767
- Launched: 20 March 1769
- Completed: August 1769
- Commissioned: 1 December 1769
- Home port: Cádiz, Spain
- Fate: Captured at Trafalgar, 21 October 1805; scuttled 22 October.

General characteristics
- Class & type: Ship of the line
- Displacement: 4,950 tons
- Length: 61.3 m (201 ft)
- Beam: 16.2 m (53 ft)
- Draught: 8.02 m (26.3 ft)
- Troops: ≈140
- Complement: 1,050 crewmen
- Armament: 116 guns as built: Lower deck 30 × 36 pdrs; Middle deck 32 × 24 pdrs; Upper deck 32 × 12 pdrs; Quarterdeck and forecastle 22 × 8 pdrs

Nuestra Señora de la Santísima Trinidad ("Our Lady of the Most Holy Trinity"), nicknamed La Real (The Royal), was a ship of the line of the Spanish Navy which was the largest warship in the world when launched. She originally mounted 112 guns, which was increased between 1795 and 1796 to 130 guns by closing in the spar deck between the quarterdeck and forecastle. In 1802 Santísima Trinidad was further upgraded to 140 guns, including four guns on the poop deck, effectively creating a continuous fourth gundeck, although the extra guns added were relatively small. She was the most heavily armed ship in the world when rebuilt, and bore the most guns of any ship of the line outfitted in the Age of Sail. Santísima Trinidad was captured by the Royal Navy on 21 October 1805 at the Battle of Trafalgar but was scuttled the next day.

== Design and construction ==
Nuestra Señora de la Santísima Trinidad was built at Havana, Cuba, being laid down in October 1767. She was designed by the Irish-born shipwright Matthew Mullan (domiciled in Spain under the name Mateo Mullán), who designed the ship as a 112-gun ship of the line. Following Mullan's death on 25 November, construction of the ship was overseen by his son, Ignacio Mullán. The ship was launched in March 1769 and commissioned in August 1769 as a 116-gun three-decker.

There is no known complete plan of the ship in existence, but there are of Mullan's original 112-gun design from 1765, from which the original dimensions of the ship may be found. Here, the units of length are the Spanish Burgos foot (27.86 cm) and the SI metre (100 cm), respectively: length = 213 2/3 (59.53); keel = 182 5/12 (50.82); beam = 57 3/4 (16.09); draught = 28 11/12 (8.06). (Note: For exact figures, and those in the General characteristics frame, see: José Cayuela Fernandez, Trafalgar, hombres y naves entre dos épocas: Ariel (2004))

When launched Nuestra Señora de la Santísima Trinidad was the largest warship in the world, for which she was nicknamed El Escorial de los mares by the Spanish, until surpassed in sheer size by the new type French 120-gun ships such as Océan (1790) and Orient (1791). In 1795, Nuestra Señora de la Santísima Trinidad's forecastle was joined to her quarterdeck to create a fourth deck containing a battery of eight pounder guns, giving the ship a total of 130 guns. Her armament seems to have been quickly reduced to 130 from 136 guns, but she still carried more guns than any other ship of her time.

The weight of the additional guns, so high above her waterline, made her poor sailing qualities even worse, leading to her other nickname El Ponderoso. (Note: El Ponderoso, 'the ponderous' is a pun on el poderoso, 'the powerful'.) Some Spanish naval officers recommended that she should be restricted to defending the Bay of Cádiz. Santísima Trinidad remains notable as one of the few four-decker ships of the line ever built. The US Navy constructed the four-deck, 136-gun Pennsylvania and the French Navy, the 120-gun Valmy (both with similar flush deck arrangement). The Royal Navy planned – but did not build – the 170-gun four-decker HMS Duke of Kent.

== Service ==
In July 1779, Spain declared war on Great Britain on the side of France as part of the American Revolutionary War. 'Nuestra Señora de la Santísima Trinidad became the flagship of the Spanish navy, taking part in the failed Armada of 1779 in the English Channel in the late summer of that year. During the action of 9 August 1780 she took part in the capture of 55 merchant ships from a convoy of 63, escorted by the ship of the line HMS Ramillies and three frigates. In 1782 Nuestra Señora de la Santísima Trinidad was incorporated into the Spanish Mediterranean Squadron, participating in the Great Siege of Gibraltar and the Battle of Cape Spartel. In 1795, she was modified by the addition of extra 8-pounder guns on a new deck between her forecastle and quarterdeck.

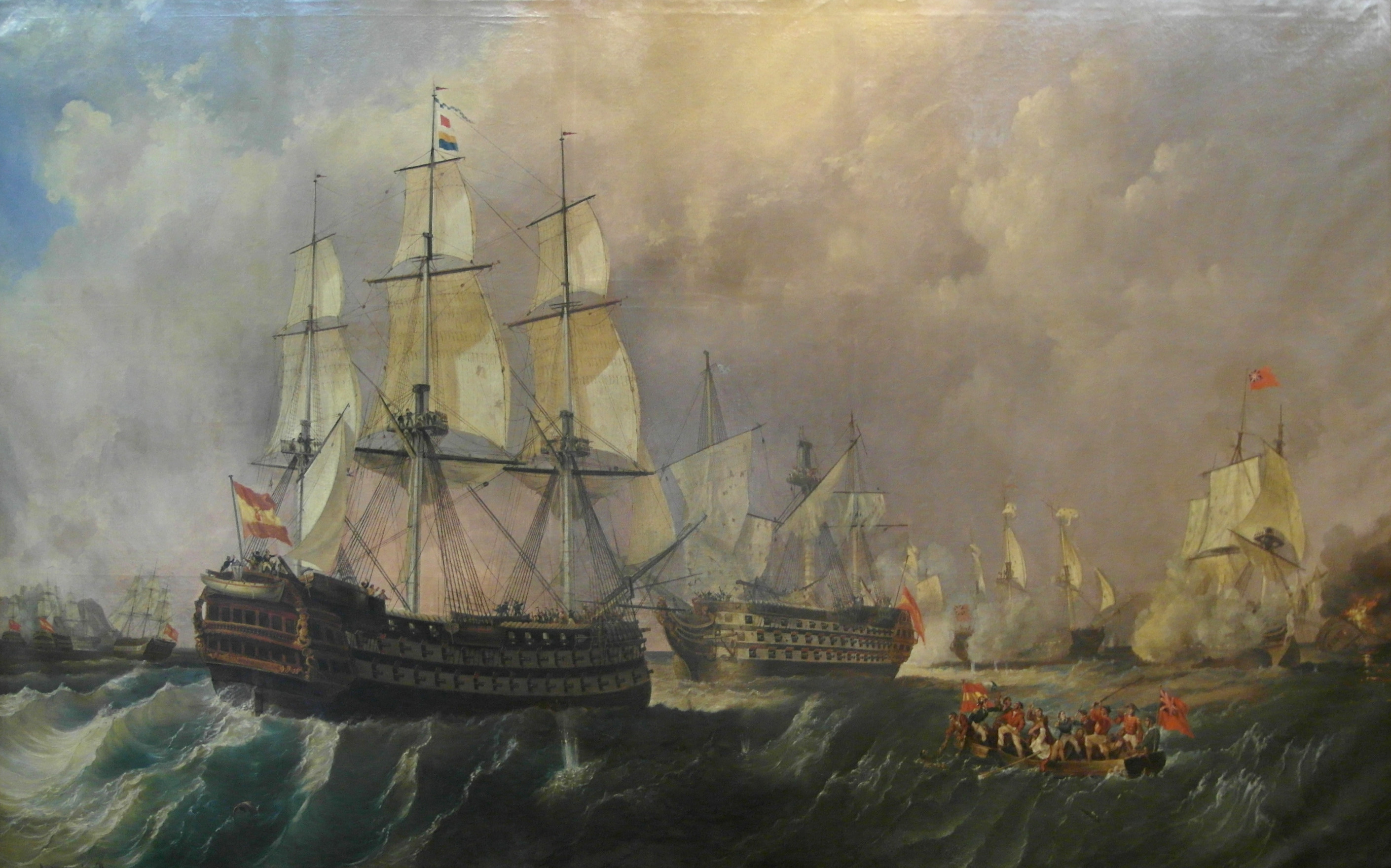
Infante don Pelayo going to rescue Nuestra Señora de la Santísima Trinidad at Battle of Cape St. Vincent

In 1797, Nuestra Señora de la Santísima Trinidad was the flagship of Lieutenant-general José de Córdoba y Ramos, the commander of the Spanish fleet which fought at the Battle of Cape St. Vincent on 14 February, where she was badly damaged and nearly captured by the British navy. She was first in action with HMS Captain and HMS Culloden. She was then attacked by Blenheim, Orion, Irresistible and Excellent. By now Nuestra Señora de la Santísima Trinidad was severely damaged, having lost all her masts and with half of her crew killed or wounded. She struck her colours, but the British failed to take possession and she was saved by the Infante don Pelayo and Principe de Asturias. On 1 March, Nuestra Señora de la Santísima Trinidad was making her way back to Spain when she was spotted and engaged by the 32-gun frigate HMS Terpsichore under Captain Richard Bowen, but escaped. Nuestra Señora de la Santísima Trinidad eventually returned to Cádiz and underwent repairs there.

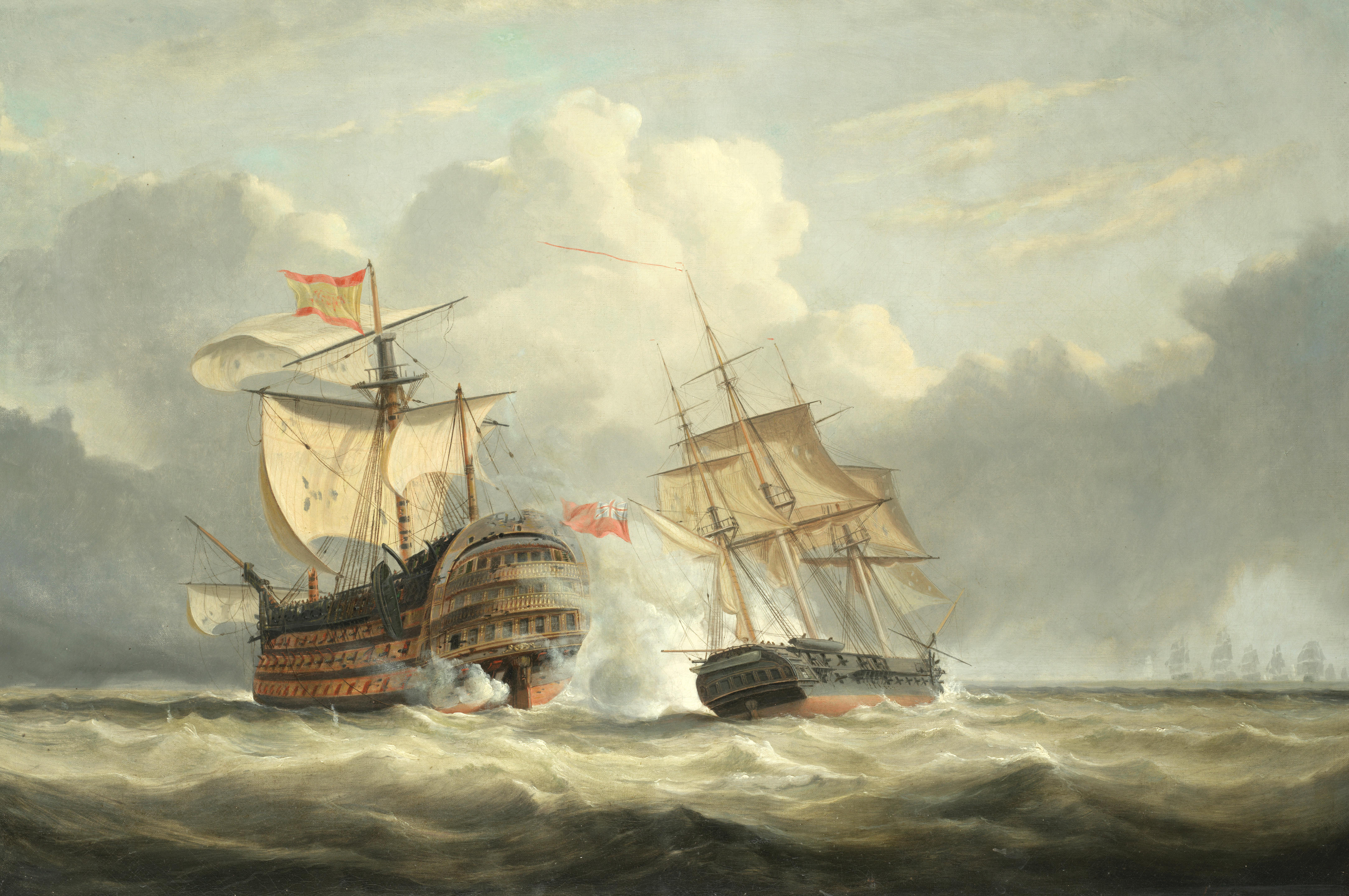
HMS Terpsichore attacking Nuestra Señora de la Santísima Trinidad on 1 March 1797

Eight years later, commanded by Francisco Javier Uriarte and the flagship of Squadron Commander Baltasar Hidalgo de Cisneros, she took part in the Battle of Trafalgar on 21 October 1805 as part of the combined Franco-Spanish fleet. Due to her great bulk, her helm was unresponsive in the light winds on the day, contributing to her ineffective service in the combined fleet's cause. Her great size and position immediately ahead of the fleet flagship Bucentaure made her a target for the British fleet, and she came under concentrated attack by several ships, even though she managed to engage seven enemy vessels and inflict impressive casualties to the British flagship. She lost her mast and eventually surrendered with 200 dead and a hundred wounded to the Neptune, a 98-gun second rate commanded by Captain Thomas Fremantle. She was taken in tow by the 98-gun second rate Prince, but was eventually scuttled by her British captors northwest of Cádiz.

It is possible that her wreck was found by coincidence during testing of a new sidescan sonar of the Spanish Navy, in 2009. An earlier attempt to find her wreck was inconclusive as lack of visual evidence could not confirm the identity of the ships found.

== Replicas ==
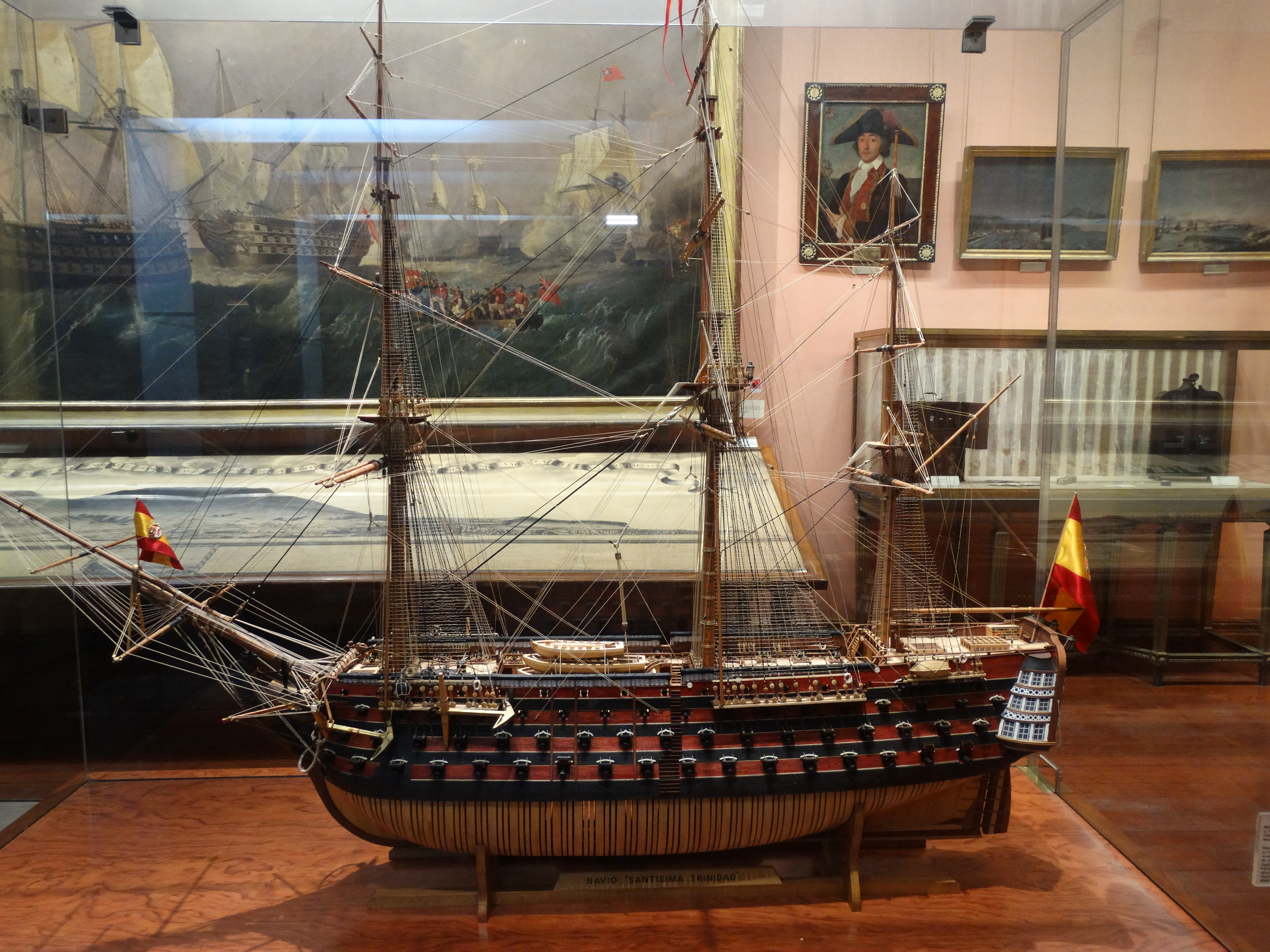
Model of Nuestra Señora de la Santísima Trinidad at the Naval Museum of Madrid

A full-size representation of Nuestra Señora de la Santísima Trinidad could be seen in the harbour of Alicante, in Spain. This vessel had formerly operated as a floating restaurant. To allow regeneration works to the marina area, where the ship's mooring has now become an extended boardwalk, the replica was towed outside of the harbour and left moored on the seaward side of the breakwater. Here, close to the Panoramis centre, the ship gradually became a rotting hulk, with most of the masts and rigging collapsed onto the main deck. After seven years of lying idle since its closure as a restaurant in 2016, the Port Authority declared the ship abandoned and destined for scrapping. This process was completed in July 2023.

A non-profit non-governmental Canadian association, the Friends of Santísima Trinidad, assisted the Office of the Historian of the City of Havana with the construction of a new 1:25 four-metre-long scale model Nuestra Señora de la Santísima Trinidad. Interior construction details are exposed on one side of the vessel, and visitors are able to use a computer interface and touch screen to take a virtual tour of the ship in Spanish, English, and French. The model is displayed in the Naval Museum of La Habana, opened in June 2008 at Castillo de la Real Fuerza, the oldest building in Cuba and the oldest stone fortress in the New World.

== Bibliography ==
- Adkin, Mark (2005). The Trafalgar Companion: A Guide to History's Most Famous Sea Battle and the Life of Admiral Lord Nelson. Aurum. ISBN 1-84513-018-9.
- Adkins, Roy (2004). Trafalgar: The Biography of a Battle. Little, Brown. ISBN 0-316-72511-0.
- Clayton, Tim & Craig, Phil (2004). Trafalgar: The Men, the Battle, the Storm. Hodder & Stoughton. ISBN 0-340-83026-3.
- Fremont-Barnes, Gregory (2005). Trafalgar 1805: Nelson's Crowning Victory. Campaign. Vol. 157. Osprey Publishing. ISBN 1-84176-892-8.
- Goodwin, Peter (2005). The Ships of Trafalgar: The British, French and Spanish Fleets October 1805. Naval Institute Press. ISBN 1-59114-824-3.*John D. Harbron Trafalgar and the Spanish Navy (1988) ISBN 0-87021-695-3
- José Cayuela Fernandez – Trafalgar, hombres y naves entre dos épocas – Ariel (Barcelona) 2004 ISBN 8434467607
- Winfield, Rif; Tredrea, John M; García-Torralba Pérez, Enrique & Blasco Felip, Manuel (2023). Spanish Warships in the Age of Sail 1700—1860: Design, Construction, Careers and Fates. Seaforth Publishing. ISBN 978-1-5267-9078-1.
