= Richard Bowen (Royal Navy officer) =

Captain Richard Bowen
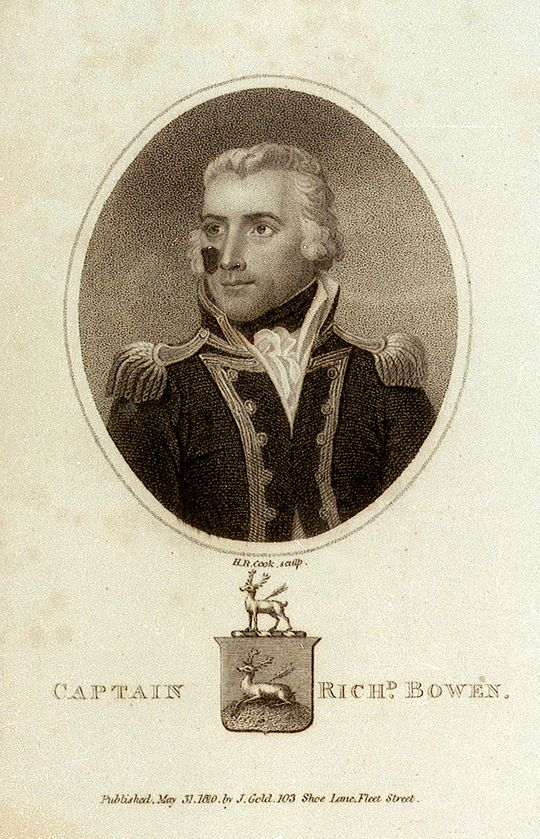
- Born: 1761; Ilfracombe, Devon
- Died: 25 July 1797 (aged 35–36); Santa Cruz de Tenerife, Tenerife, Canary Islands
- Relatives: James Bowen (brother); John Bowen (nephew)
- Military career
- Allegiance: Kingdom of Great Britain
- Branch: Royal Navy
- Service years: 1779–1797
- Rank: Captain
- Commands: HMS Zebra; HMS Veteran; HMS Terpsichore
- Conflicts: French Revolutionary Wars; Battle of Santa Cruz de Tenerife †

Richard Bowen (1761 – 25 July 1797) was an officer of the Royal Navy who served during the American War of Independence and the French Revolutionary Wars. Bowen saw service with Horatio Nelson, and was killed fighting alongside him at the Battle of Santa Cruz de Tenerife.

Bowen was born into a naval family, and first saw service alongside several distinguished naval figures, including John Jervis, who would become a long-standing friend and patron to Bowen. Bowen rose to prominence after distinguishing himself in several actions, but was unable to gain a commission by the end of the war with America, and spent several years in the Caribbean, hoping to receive promotion. He took the opportunity to carry out a resupply mission to the colonies in Australia during the interwar years, a task he completed successfully, even though it involved a circumnavigation of the globe. Away from Britain for a considerable length of time while carrying this out, he found on his return that war had broken out with France. Reuniting with his old patron Jervis, Bowen returned to the Caribbean and after distinguishing himself in actions against the French colonies there, finally received his own commands. He followed Jervis to the Mediterranean and took part in several hard-fought frigate actions, and even went so far as to attack the Santísima Trinidad, the largest warship in the world at the time, in his 32-gun frigate, HMS Terpsichore. He was operating off Tenerife in 1797 when he came under the command of Rear-Admiral Horatio Nelson, who was quickly impressed by Bowen's zeal and ability. Bowen was given the task of leading the first wave of the assault on the town of Santa Cruz de Tenerife, but the attack went badly. The defenders poured grapeshot onto the attacking British, killing and wounding many, Bowen was killed while Nelson was badly wounded.

Bowen's body was recovered and buried at sea. His friends and relations pressured the authorities for the erection of a memorial in one of the main London churches, but their requests were turned down.

== Family and early life ==
Bowen was born in Ilfracombe, Devon in 1761. The Bowens were a seafaring family, with Richard's older brother James and two other siblings, George and Thomas, all serving in the navy. Richard went to sea at the age of thirteen, joining his father, who was captain of merchant ship. After two years with his father Richard joined his elder brother James' merchant ship and made trading voyages between England and Jamaica. He was at Jamaica in 1778 when news reached him of the outbreak of war with the American colonies. He applied to join the navy as a volunteer and a position was found for him by his friend, Captain Benjamin Caldwell, then the commander of the frigate HMS Emerald. Caldwell and Bowen sailed to England in 1779, whereupon Caldwell was appointed to command the 50-gun HMS Hannibal. Finding her to be unready for sea, Bowen and a number of the officers from Emerald joined the guardship at the Nore, HMS Dunkirk. Caldwell went on to equip the 14-gun ship-sloop HMS Lightning for service while awaiting the launch of Hannibal, and Bowen received an appointment to her and the position of midshipman on 12 August 1779. Despite this he does not seem to have served aboard her, instead joining HMS Foudroyant under Captain John Jervis.

Bowen served with Jervis aboard Foudroyant for several years. On 29 July 1781 Foudroyant was part of Vice-Admiral Sir George Darby's fleet when two French warships were sighted. The wind made prevented the British from approaching, causing Darby to order boats to tow HMS Perseverance into range. Bowen commanded one of the boats, and his actions and exertions caused favourable comments from his superiors. Perseverance was able to capture one of the French ships, which proved to be the former British HMS Lively, while the second French ship, the corvette Hirondelle, escaped by using her sweeps. Bowen's second chance to prove his qualities came in 1782, after Darby had been succeeded by Samuel Barrington as commander of the Channel Fleet. On 20 April an enemy French fleet was sighted by lookouts aboard Captain John MacBride's HMS Artois. A general chase ensued, forcing the French fleet to disperse. Foudroyant led the chase and eventually became separated from the rest of the fleet. Jervis pressed on, bringing the sternmost French ship, the 74-gun Pégase to action early in the morning of 21 April and forcing her to surrender. Bowen acted as aide-de-camp to Jervis during the battle, and acquitted himself so well that Jervis advanced him to acting-lieutenant. Bowen also received a sword from his friend Robert Calder.

The damaged Foudroyant underwent a repair and refit, during which time Jervis arranged for the transfer of some his crew including Bowen to MacBride's Artois. Bowen, serving as third-lieutenant, and MacBride cruised in the Bay of Biscay, with Richard coincidentally serving under his brother James, the elder Bowen being the master of Artois. Richard's service aboard Artois came to an end when Jervis, by now appointed commodore and commander-in-chief of a secret expedition, sent for his men to rejoin Foudroyant. The war came to an end before the expedition could be carried out and Foudroyant was paid off. Jervis found a place for Bowen as master's mate aboard HMS Pegase, the ship he had helped to capture in 1782. From there he was moved to the 98-gun HMS Blenheim and in late 1783 to the 50-gun HMS Adamant. He went out in the later ship to the West Indies with Rear-Admiral Sir Richard Hughes. He spent three years on the station, several times being appointed temporary lieutenant but being unable to have the commission confirmed.

== Years of frustration ==
Bowen returned home in 1786, and passed his examination on 7 November 1787. With the prospect of war with the Dutch looming in 1787 he received an appointment to HMS Royal Sovereign, which was being prepared as the flagship of Admiral Hugh Pigot. Bowen hoped for a lieutenant's commission, but was to be disappointed, the war did not materialise and he found himself unemployed again. He went out to the West Indies on the advice of his brother James, and his patron Jervis, and with their recommendations he was able to secure the attention of the commander of the station Commodore Sir Peter Parker. Parker made him acting-lieutenant of the 50-gun HMS Jupiter on his arrival in January 1788, but he was superseded shortly afterwards by the arrival of Lord William Beauclerk. Temporarily shelving hopes for promotion, he took command of the government brig Lord Howe at the request of Sir John Orde, the Governor of Dominica. As captain of the Lord Howe he carried out anti-smuggling operations until July 1789.

== Promotion ==
During this time Bowen made studies of mathematics, astronomy and surveying, before returning to serve under his old patron, now Rear-Admiral Sir John Jervis, in 1790 during the Spanish Armament. He finally received his long-awaited commission as lieutenant on 21 September 1790, and an appointment to Jervis's flagship HMS Prince. Bowen's friend Robert Calder then requested his services aboard the 64-gun HMS Stately. Stately was paid off after the easing of tensions and Bowen applied to the Navy Board for a posting. The Board gave him command of three transports in the Third Fleet to resupply the colony at Port Jackson, New South Wales. He departed England in March 1791 and reached Port Jackson in July that year. There the Lieutenant-Governor, Philip Gidley King, decided that the rice supply was insufficient for the needs of the colony and despatched Bowen to Bengal to acquire more. Bowen set off on the voyage, dropping King and his family at Norfolk Island on the way, and sailed east past New Caledonia, the Isle of Pines and Terra Arsacides, a route never before sailed. He also sailed a never-before navigated passage, between Borneo and Paragua into the South China Sea. From there he passed through the Straits of Malacca, reaching Bengal in January 1792. After acquiring provisions he made his way back to Port Jackson. He picked up Governor Arthur Phillip in December and returned him to Britain, arriving at Spithead in May 1793. By then he had completed two long voyages, one of them around the world, in a transport vessel.

== French Revolutionary Wars ==
=== Caribbean ===
By the time of Bowen's arrival war had broken out between France and Britain. He was offered a chance to perform a similar to mission to his earlier voyages to the colonies in Australia, but turned in down in order to serve under Jervis, now commander-in-chief of an expedition to attack the French colonies in the Caribbean. Bowen joined the fleet as fourth-lieutenant and signal-officer aboard the 98-gun HMS Boyne, and after the fleet had rendezvoused at Barbados, sailed for Martinique on 3 February 1794. Jervis placed Bowen in command of the guard and gunboats after the fleet's arrival at Fort de France Bay, and instructed him to prepare an assault on a large French frigate, the Bien Venu, chained to the walls of the fort protecting the city. The frigate was rumoured to hold a number of captured English prisoners, whom the French were threatening to kill by blowing up the frigate, should the British attempt to storm the fort. Bowen developed a plan of attack and on 17 February led an assault force consisting of Boyne's barge and a number of small boats. The boats rushed the frigate and the boarding party stormed her successfully. The boarding party killed or drove off all of her crew, with the exception of twenty whom Bowen took prisoner, among them the captain and lieutenant. Finding that there were no British prisoners aboard, Bowen manned the cannon and fired a broadside into the fort. He then took his prisoners off and returned to the British ships. Only the contrary wind prevented Bowen from sailing the frigate out as well.

=== Promotion ===
Bowen received a mention in Jervis's despatches, where he was credited for convincing the commanders to carry out their assault on the fortified French positions. Bowen and the gunboats supported the landings, which resulted in a British victory. Bowen's former quarry, the Bien Venu, was captured and commissioned as HMS Undaunted under the command of Captain Robert Faulknor, who had distinguished himself in the battle while commanding HMS Zebra. Faulknor was given command of Undaunted on 20 March 1794, the same day the Bowen was promoted to master and commander, and succeeded Faulknor in command of Zebra. Bowen was promoted to post-captain in April, and briefly took command of the 64-gun HMS Veteran, before moving to the 32-gun HMS Terpsichore. He was sent out in the Terpsichore to North America, where he learnt that HMS Daedalus, under Captain Sir Charles Knowles, was being blockaded in the Chesapeake by two French frigates. Bowen set out to relieve him, an act he accomplished on 17 May, when the two British ships escaped to sea. The French attempted to pursue, but broke off when the British offered battle. Terpsichore and Daedalus sailed in company to Halifax, after which Bowen returned to the Caribbean.

There he found the British positions on Guadeloupe under pressure from French forces, and helped to resupply them until it was deemed necessary to evacuate them. He ably oversaw the withdrawal, but received a wound to the face from French shot while assisting in the evacuation of the last of the troops. He received notes of praise from Rear-Admiral Charles Thompson and Vice-Admiral Benjamin Caldwell of the navy, and General Sir John Vaughan and Lieutenant-General Robert Prescott from the army. The wound however became dangerous in the Caribbean climate, and he was sent home with the despatches.

=== North Sea and Mediterranean ===
==== Gibraltar and Mahonesa ====
Bowen soon recovered, and spent some time in the North Sea, until December 1795, when his old patron, Jervis, replaced Admiral William Hotham as commander of the Mediterranean Fleet. Jervis requested Bowen to come out and take command of a squadron of small vessels operating around Gibraltar in defence of British trade and the garrison there. He soon made himself popular, and contemporaries remarked on his zeal and dedication. In early October 1796 the British squadron under Sir John Man was chased into Gibraltar by a Spanish fleet. Bowen set out in Terpsichore to report this to Jervis, and having rendezvoused with HMS Pallas of Jervis's fleet on 10 October, began the return voyage to Gibraltar. While off Cartagena on 13 October, a frigate was spotted under full sail. Bowen's crew had been reduced by sickness, but he decided to chase down the mysterious sail. After closing on her, and determining that she was attempting to manoeuvre into a position to better fight the Terpsichore, Bowen ordered a gun be fired to test her intent. This was instantly met with a broadside, and a general action began. After an hour and forty minutes the frigate surrendered, and was discovered to be the Spanish Mahonesa. She was taken into service with the British as HMS Mahonesa. Bowen received a piece of plate valued at 100 guineas.

==== Spanish ship and Vestale ====
Bowen refitted Terpsichore and departed on another cruise, capturing several small vessels on 12 and 13 November, sending them to Gibraltar, and on 22 November he learned from an American brig that he had encountered off Cape St. Mary's, that a Spanish ship bound for Cádiz from Montevideo was in the area. Bad weather prevented Bowen from locating the Spanish vessel at first, and he also had to escape from a Spanish ship of the line that appeared and chased the Terpsichore for a while. The Spanish ship was found to be anchored in Cádiz, and at 10 am the next day Bowen entered the harbour, captured the ship and brought her out. Bowen continued to cruise off Cádiz, and while sailing through a gale on the morning of 12 December, the lookouts spotted a frigate. Bowen gave chase, with both ships hampered by the rough weather, so that it was only after 40 hours that Bowen was able to bring Terpsichore alongside and at 10 o'clock on the night of 13 December the two ships engaged each other. After two hours the frigate surrendered, and was discovered to be the 36-gun French Vestale, with 270 men aboard. She had lost her captain and 40 men killed, while her second captain and another 50 men were wounded. The Terpsichore had casualties of a quartermaster and three seamen killed, and nineteen wounded. Among the wounded was Lieutenant George Bowen, Richard Bowen's brother. George Bowen had distinguished himself during the capture of the Mahonesa, as well as being particularly active now in the capture of Vestale. Richard reported that

My brother, who was the only lieutenant onboard, and on whom fell the task of conducting the duty on the maindeck, was, by a shot fired after our opponent had actually struck, very severely, and as I much dread, incurably wounded, chiefly in the shoulder, but with the addition of several bad contusions in different places. I feel thankful, however, that I was not deprived of his co-operation, or my feelings agitated by the occasion, until our united efforts were crowned with success.^{[a]}

Shortly after the French surrender all of Vestale's masts and her bowsprit went by the board. She began to drift towards the breakers off Cádiz, while her crew were drunk. The British prize-crew managed to regain control, and both ships managed to ride out the storm that night. It was not until the following evening that the wind changed sufficiently for Bowen to attempt to tow his prize away. The line became snagged on a rock, and had to be cut for the safety of both vessels. When dawn broke the next day Bowen discovered that the French had risen up against the prize crew and retaken the ship, sailing her into Cádiz. Now bereft of his prize, Bowen returned to port empty handed, writing to Jervis that 'As we feel conscious of having done out duty, to the utmost of our power, we endeavour to console ourselves with the expectation of our conduct being approved.' Jervis confirmed this, writing

Dear Bowen, The intelligence we received from the patrons of two pilot-boats, when off Cádiz, on the 17th December, that the French frigate then lying between the Diamond and Procros, had been dismasted and captured by an English frigate, impressed us all with an opinion, that the Terpsichore had achieved this gallant action. I lament exceedingly that you and your brave crew were deprived of the substantial reward of your exertions; but you cannot fail to receive the tribute due to you from the government and country at large.^{[b]}

==== Cape St Vincent and Santísima Trinidad ====
Bowen was at Gibraltar when news of Jervis's victory at the Battle of Cape St Vincent arrived. He immediately set out to join the fleet, and having fallen in with several other British frigates, including HMS Emerald, came across the Spanish first rate Santísima Trinidad. The Spanish ship was flying the Union Jack above her own colours, indicating that she was in the hands of a British prize-crew, but the bad weather meant no meaningful exchange could take place between the frigates and the Spanish vessel, and it was suspected that the British colours were being used as a ruse de guerre. After the frigates lost sight of the ship in bad weather, Bowen hurried to report the sighting to Jervis. While returning to his station he again fell in with the Santísima Trinidad, and determined to see if she would surrender to him. He opened fire on the massive Spanish vessel, at the time the world's largest warship, carrying 136-guns on four decks, over a hundred more guns than the Terpsichore. The Spanish ship resisted Bowen's fire, and he broke off the attack. It was later discovered that Bowen's attack had killed nine men, and left a number of others badly wounded.

==== The Spanish retreat ====
Terpsichore was in harbour, tied alongside the Mole in late May, and taking advantage of her apparent unreadiness to put to sea, two Spanish frigates carrying troops and money, attempted to leave Algeciras on 29 May. This was reported to Bowen, who quickly got Terpsichore to sea, and joining HMS Pallas, gave chase. Rather than risk an engagement the two Spanish ships rushed back to port. Terpsichore had by now gained the nickname 'Little Devil' amongst the Spanish. Pallas returned to port, but Terpsichore lingered, and that night captured a small prize from under the guns of the Spanish shore batteries.

==== Cutting Out of the Principe Fernando ====
In April Jervis sent Bowen in the Terpsichore accompanied by the Dido to reconnoitre off Tenerife, where they found the Cádiz-bound Philippine frigates Principe Fernando and El Principe d'Asturia in the Bay of Santa Cruz. On the night of 17/18 April a joint cutting out expedition was mounted by the two British frigates, each sending three boats of which those from the Terpsichore under the command of its First Lieutenant (Lieutenant George Thorp) successfully captured the nearer of the Indiamen to the shore, Principe Fernando, sailing and towing her to sea while under fire from shore batteries for two hours.

== Santa Cruz and death ==
Bowen took part in the first bombardment of Santa Cruz de Tenerife on 5 July, and worked with Rear-Admiral Horatio Nelson to prepare plans for an assault on the town. In the Battle of Santa Cruz de Tenerife on 24 July Bowen was assigned to lead the landing parties onto the mole. At the head of forty or fifty of his men he gained the mole, took the battery covering the harbour by storm and spiked its guns, and was advancing into the town in pursuit of the fleeing Spanish. As he did so the Spanish fired a large round of grapeshot onto his party, causing heavy casualties. Bowen and his first lieutenant (George Thorp) were among those killed, while Nelson and his men, who were just landing, were caught in the fire, Nelson being hit in his right arm. Bowen's body was recovered the next morning and returned to the British ships after the withdrawal. Nelson said of Bowen that '...a more enterprising, able, and gallant officer, does not grace His Majesty's naval service!' Bowen was buried at sea on 27 July.

== Legacy ==
There were applications after Bowen's death for a memorial to be erected to him in Westminster Abbey. Both his brother, Rear-Admiral James Bowen, and Sir John Jervis pressured the First Lord of the Admiralty Lord Spencer, while Nelson wrote to Jervis;

Why is not a monument voted in St. Paul's, to perpetuate the memory of the gallant Bowen? I put it strongly to Lord Spencer. If you have an opportunity, pray express my surprise, that no mention has been made in either House of Parliament.

Spencer demurred however, on the grounds that there was no precedent for such a memorial, when the action in which he was killed was not successful. His father instead had a memorial to him erected in Ilfracombe parish church. The Naval Chronicle summarised his life and achievements;

...that spirited and indefatigable officer, who, in time of peace, had relieved and rescued from ruin an infant colony; who had taken from the enemy three frigates, of very superior force, after obstinate engagements, and one of them with boats only, in the face of a powerful land force; who had preserved, to render further services to his Majesty, the brave garrison of Fort Matilda, at Guadeloupe; who had, in his little frigate, engaged the largest first rate in the Spanish navy; who had annoyed the enemy's trade almost beyond example; who, for the protection which he had afforded to the commerce of Britain, had received the most honourable acknowledgements from the merchants of London; who had been dangerously wounded in the execution of his duty; and who had finally laid down his inestimable life, for the glory of his King and Country.

Jervis Bay in New South Wales, Australia was entered and named by Bowen in 1791 in the convict transport ship Atlantic of the Third Fleet, in honour of Admiral John Jervis. When explorer George Bass entered the same bay on 10 December 1797 he named Bowen Island in honour of Richard Bowen, who had been killed in July of that year.

== Notes ==
a. George Bowen recovered from his wound, and was promoted to commander for his service during the action. Jervis wrote in his congratulatory letter to Richard Bowen

I was very much agitated by the danger you apprehended your brother was in, when you wrote: I have, however, derived great consolation from the report of Captain Mansfield, that he was much recovered and was able to walk down to the Mole, before he sailed.

B. The Vestale was captured in 1799 by Captain Charles Cunningham's HMS Clyde.
