= HMS Terpsichore (1785) =

Frigate of the Royal Navy

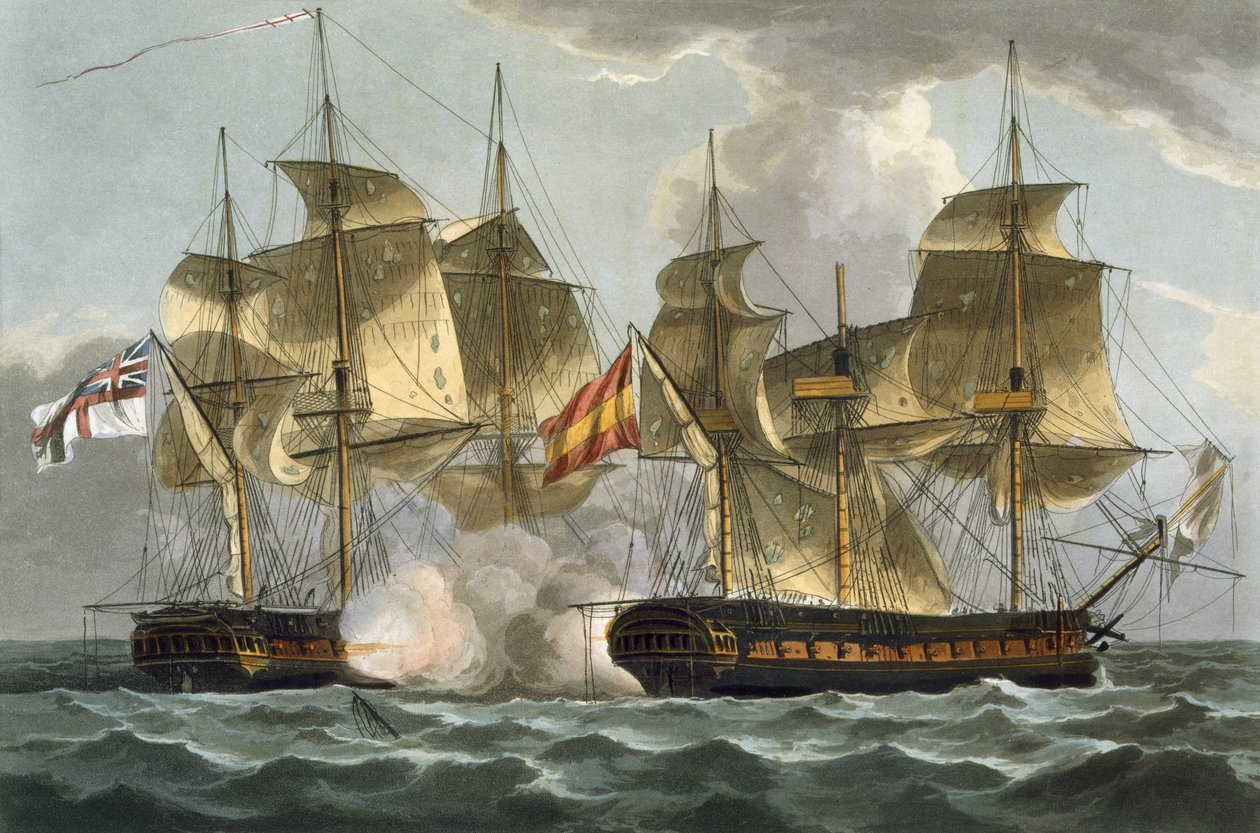
- Terpsichore (left) during the action of 13 October 1796

History

Great Britain
- Name: HMS Terpsichore
- Ordered: 29 July 1782
- Builder: James Betts, Mistleythorn
- Laid down: November 1782
- Launched: 17 December 1785
- Completed: By November 1786
- Fate: Broken up in November 1830

General characteristics
- Class & type: 32-gun Amazon-class fifth-rate frigate
- Tons burthen: 6824/94 bm
- Length: 126 ft (38.4 m) (overall); 103 ft 8 in (31.6 m) (keel)
- Beam: 35 ft 1 1/2 in (10.7 m)
- Depth of hold: 12 ft 2 in (3.7 m)
- Propulsion: Sails
- Sail plan: Full-rigged ship
- Complement: 220
- Armament: Upper deck: 26 × 12-pounder guns; QD: 4 × 6-pounder guns + 4 × 18-pounder carronades; Fc: 2 × 6-pounder guns+ 2 × 18-pounder carronades

HMS Terpsichore was a 32-gun Amazon-class fifth-rate frigate of the Royal Navy. She was built during the last years of the American War of Independence, but did not see action until the French Revolutionary Wars. She served during the French Revolutionary and Napoleonic Wars, in a career that spanned forty-five years.

Terpsichore was launched in 1785, but was not prepared for active service until the outbreak of the French Revolutionary Wars in 1793. She was initially sent to serve in the West Indies where in 1794 Captain Richard Bowen took command. Bowen commanded Terpsichore until his death in 1797, and several of her most memorable exploits occurred during his captaincy. Terpsichore served mostly in the Mediterranean, capturing three frigates, and in 1797 went as far as to attack the damaged Spanish first rate Santísima Trinidad, as she limped away from the Battle of Cape St Vincent. Santísima Trinidad mounted 136 guns to Terpsichore's 32, and was the largest warship in the world at time. Terpsichore inflicted several casualties, before abandoning the attack.

Terpsichore passed through several commanders after Bowen's death at Tenerife, and went out to the East Indies, where her last commander was Captain William Augustus Montagu. Montagu fought an action with a large French frigate in 1808, and though he was able to outfight her, he was not able to capture her. Terpsichore returned to Britain the following year, and spent the last years of the war laid up in ordinary. She survived in this state until 1830, when she was broken up.

== Construction and commissioning ==
Terpsichore was ordered from James Betts, of Mistleythorn on 29 July 1782 and laid down there in November that year. She was launched on 29 July 1785 and completed between 31 January and November 1786, at a cost of £8,295.18.3d, with a further £104.15.2d spent on her boats, plus £4,025 for fitting out and coppering. The war with America was over by the time she was ready for service, and with no immediate use for her with the draw-down of the navy, Terpsichore was placed in ordinary at Chatham.

== Early years and French Revolutionary Wars ==
With the outbreak of the French Revolutionary Wars in February 1793, many ships that had been laid up were reactivated. Terpsichore was repaired by Pitcher, of Northfleet for the sum of £2,979 between March and August 1793, and was then fitted for service at Woolwich for a further £5,833 between August and 8 October 1793. After nearly a decade spent laid up she commissioned under her first captain, Sampson Edwards, in August 1793 and sailed for the Leeward Islands in December that year. She captured the privateer Montague on 16 August 1794, and in September that year Sampson left the ship, being replaced by Captain Richard Bowen. Bowen was sent to North America, where he learnt that HMS Daedalus, under Captain Sir Charles Knowles, was being blockaded in the Chesapeake by two French frigates. Bowen set out to relieve him, an act he accomplished on 17 May, when the two British ships escaped to sea. The French attempted to pursue, but broke off when the British offered battle. Terpsichore and Daedalus sailed in company to Halifax, after which Bowen returned to the Caribbean. Bowen and Terpsichore then operated in support of the British forces on Guadeloupe, which were under pressure from French forces, and helped to resupply them until it was deemed necessary to evacuate them. Terpsichore covered the withdrawal, with Bowen receiving a wound to the face from French shot while assisting in the evacuation of the last of the troops. The wound became dangerous in the Caribbean climate, and Bowen was sent home aboard Terpsichore with the despatches.

== North Sea and Mediterranean ==
=== Mahonesa ===
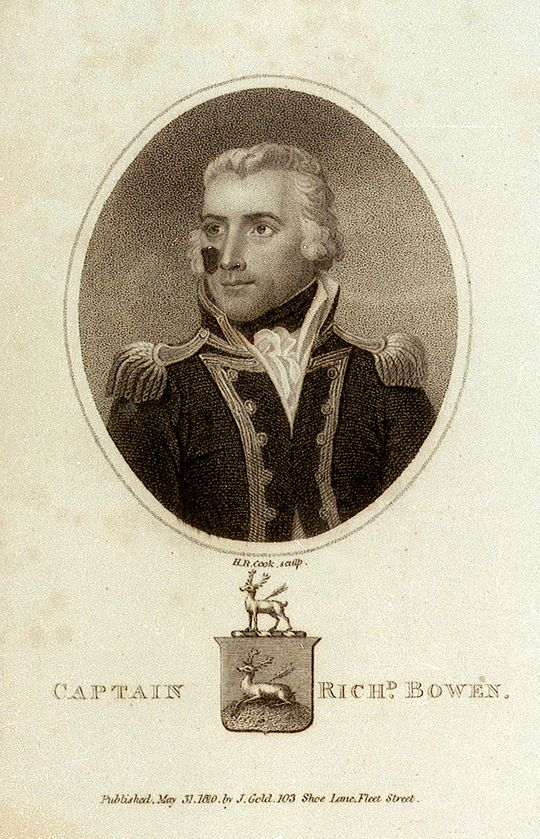
Captain Richard Bowen, Terpsichore's commander for many of her greatest exploits until his death at the Battle of Santa Cruz de Tenerife in 1797

Bowen and the Terpsichore spent some time in the North Sea, until December 1795, when his old patron, Jervis, replaced Admiral William Hotham as commander of the Mediterranean Fleet. Jervis requested Bowen to come out and take command of a squadron of small vessels operating around Gibraltar in defence of British trade and the garrison there. In early October 1796 the British squadron under Sir John Man was chased into Gibraltar by a Spanish fleet. Bowen set out in Terpsichore to report this to Jervis, and having rendezvoused with HMS Pallas of Jervis's fleet on 10 October, began the return voyage to Gibraltar. While off Cartagena on 13 October, a frigate was spotted under full sail. Bowen's crew had been reduced by sickness, but he decided to chase down the mysterious sail. After closing on her, and determining that she was attempting to manoeuvre into a position to better fight the Terpsichore, Bowen ordered a gun be fired to test her intent. This was instantly met with a broadside, and a general action began. After an hour and forty minutes the frigate surrendered, and was discovered to be the Spanish Mahonesa. Terpsichore had four men wounded during the battle and none killed. Mahonesa was taken into service with the British as HMS Mahonesa. Bowen received a piece of plate valued at 100 guineas.

=== Vestale ===
Bowen refitted Terpsichore and departed on another cruise, capturing several small vessels on 12 and 13 November, sending them to Gibraltar, and on 22 November he learned from an American brig that he had encountered off Cape St. Mary's, that a Spanish ship bound for Cádiz from Montevideo was in the area. Bad weather prevented Bowen from locating the Spanish vessel at first, and he also had to escape from a Spanish ship of the line that appeared and chased Terpsichore for a while. The Spanish ship was found to be anchored in Cádiz, and at 10 am the next day Bowen entered the harbour, captured the ship and brought her out. Bowen continued to cruise off Cádiz, and while sailing through a gale on the morning of 12 December, the lookouts spotted a frigate. Bowen gave chase, with both ships hampered by the rough weather, so that it was only after 40 hours that Bowen was able to bring Terpsichore alongside and at 10 o'clock on the night of 13 December the two ships engaged each other. After two hours the frigate surrendered, and was discovered to be the 36-gun French Vestale, with 270 men aboard. She had lost her captain and 40 men killed, while her second captain and another 50 men were wounded. The Terpsichore had casualties of a quartermaster and three seamen killed, and nineteen wounded.

Shortly after the French surrender all of Vestale's masts and her bowsprit went by the board. She began to drift towards the breakers off Cádiz, while her crew were drunk. The British prize-crew managed to regain control, and both ships managed to ride out the storm that night. It was not until the following evening that the wind changed sufficiently for Bowen to attempt to tow his prize away. The line became snagged on a rock, and had to be cut for the safety of both vessels. When dawn broke the next day Bowen discovered that the French had risen up against the prize crew and retaken the ship, sailing her into Cádiz. Now bereft of his prize, Bowen returned to port empty handed, writing to Jervis that 'As we feel conscious of having done out duty, to the utmost of our power, we endeavour to console ourselves with the expectation of our conduct being approved.' Jervis confirmed this, writing

Dear Bowen, The intelligence we received from the patrons of two pilot-boats, when off Cádiz, on the 17th December, that the French frigate then lying between the Diamond and Procros, had been dismasted and captured by an English frigate, impressed us all with an opinion, that the Terpsichore had achieved this gallant action. I lament exceedingly that you and your brave crew were deprived of the substantial reward of your exertions; but you cannot fail to receive the tribute due to you from the government and country at large.

=== Santísima Trinidad ===
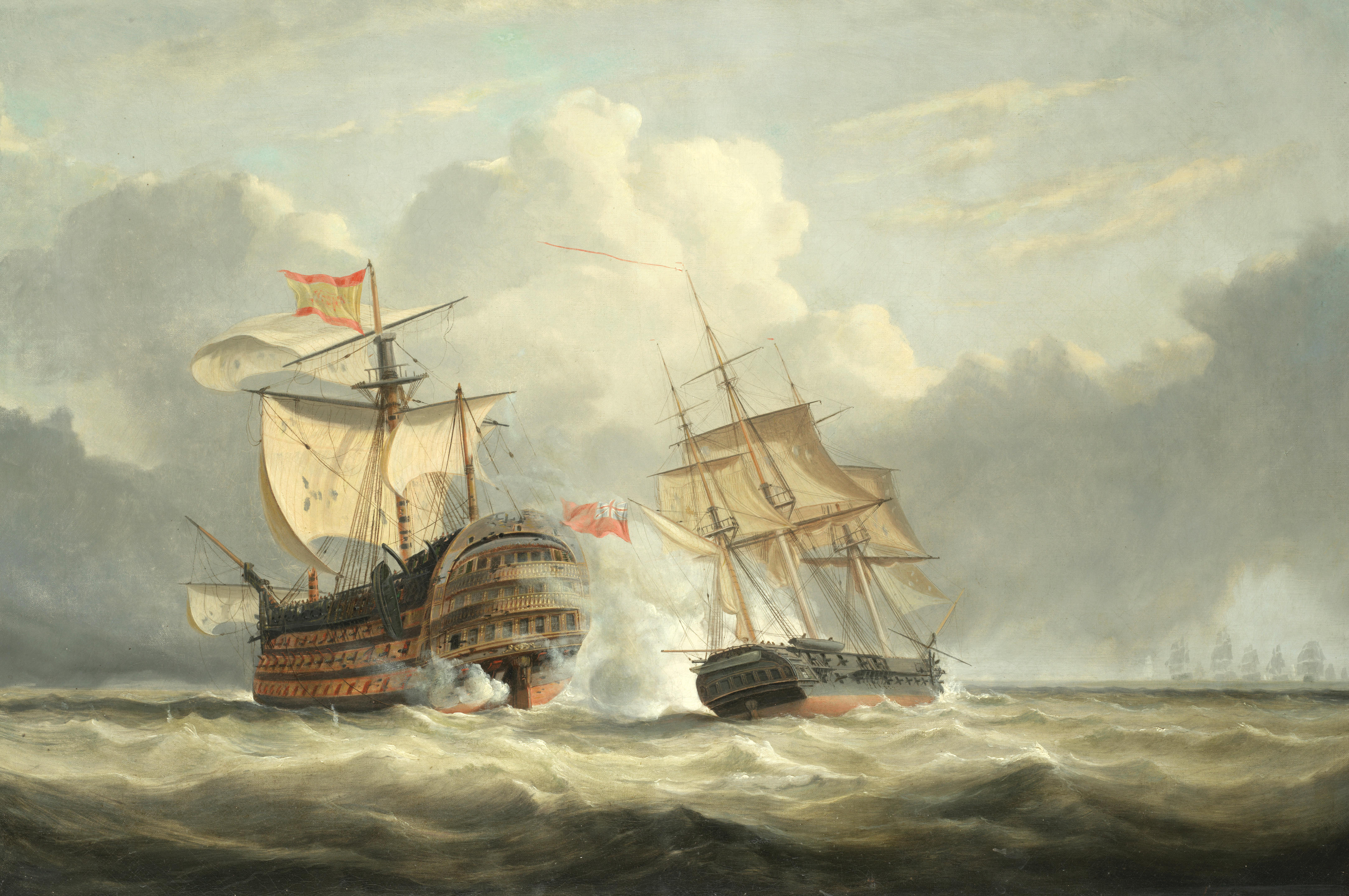
Terpsichore attacking the Santissima Trinidad, 2 weeks after the Battle of St. Vincent, by John Christian Schetky

Bowen was at Gibraltar when news of Jervis's victory at the Battle of Cape St Vincent of 14 February 1797 arrived. He immediately set out to join the fleet, and having fallen in with several other British frigates, including HMS Emerald, came across the Spanish first rate Santísima Trinidad. The Spanish ship was flying the Union Jack above her own colours, indicating that she was in the hands of a British prize crew, but the bad weather meant no meaningful exchange could take place between the frigates and the Spanish vessel, and it was suspected that the British colours were being used as a ruse of war. After the frigates lost sight of the ship in bad weather, Bowen hurried to report the sighting to Jervis. While returning to his station he again fell in with Santísima Trinidad, and determined to see if she would surrender to him. He opened fire on the massive Spanish vessel, at the time the world's largest warship, carrying 136-guns on four decks, over a hundred more guns than Terpsichore. The Spanish ship resisted Bowen's fire, and he broke off the attack. It was later discovered that Bowen's attack had killed nine men, and left a number of others badly wounded.

=== Cutting out of Principe Fernando ===
In April Jervis sent Bowen in Terpsichore accompanied by Dido to reconnoitre off Tenerife, where they found the Cádiz-bound Philippine frigates Principe Fernando and El Principe d'Asturia in the Bay of Santa Cruz. On the night of 17/18 April a joint cutting out expedition was mounted by the two British frigates, each sending three boats of which those from Terpsichore under the command of its first lieutenant (Lieutenant George Thorp) successfully captured the nearer of the Indiamen to the shore, Principe Fernando, sailing and towing her to sea while under fire from shore batteries for two hours.

=== Santa Cruz ===
Jervis again sent Bowen to reconnoitre off Tenerife in mid-1797, and at midnight on 18 June he captured a rich ship from the Manillas bound for Cádiz.

Next, Terpsichore participated in the bombardment of Cádiz on 5 July.

Bowen and Rear-Admiral Horatio Nelson then prepared plans for an assault on Santa Cruz de Tenerife. In the Battle of Santa Cruz de Tenerife on 24 July Bowen was assigned to lead the landing parties onto the Mole. He led forty or fifty of his men and managed to land on the mole and take the battery covering the harbour by storm, spiking its guns, and was advancing into the town in pursuit of the fleeing Spanish. As he did so the Spanish fired a large round of grapeshot onto his party, killing Bowen, his first lieutenant (George Thorp) and many of his men, while Nelson and his men, who were just landing, were caught in the fire, Nelson being hit in his right arm. Bowen's body was recovered the next morning and returned to the British ships after the withdrawal. He was buried at sea on 27 July.

== Later French Revolutionary Wars ==
Bowen was succeeded by Captain William Hall Gage, who took over command two days after Bowen's death, on 26 July 1797. Terpsichore worked to enforce the blockade of Malta throughout 1798.

On 7 May 1798 Terpsichore captured the French Navy xebec Pierre, near Toulon south of Cape Sicié. (Note: Pierre, of six 6-pounder guns and 60 men, had been launched at Toulon Dockyard in August 1795. French records give the location of the capture as about four miles further east at Cape Cépet, and the commander of Pierre as enseigne de vaisseau Camus.)

A marine caused a major incident on 10 August 1798 on Terpsichore. He was on guard at a cabin door when he fired his musket into a box of gunpowder, which blew up. The explosion injured the captain, first lieutenant, doctor, master, and 20 seamen, four of whom later died.

On 23 June 1799 Terpsichore captured the 14-gun San Antonio.

On 25 July 1800 Terpsichore was part of a squadron that also included Nemesis, Prevoyante, Arrow, and the hired armed lugger Nile. The squadron encountered the Danish frigate HDMS Freja, which was escorting a convoy of two ships, two brigs and two galliots. Baker hailed her and said that he would send a boat to board the convoy. The Danish captain refused, and said that if a boat approached he would fire on it. Baker sent a midshipman and four men in a boat, and the Danes fired several shots, which missed the boat, but one of which killed a man on Nemesis. Nemesis then opened fire with her broadside. After an engagement of about 25 minutes, Freja, much damaged, struck. She had suffered eight men killed and many wounded; both Nemesis and Arrow each suffered two men killed and several wounded. The British brought Freja and her convoy into the Downs on 6 August. They later released her, and presumably the rest of the convoy. This incident led to strained relations with Denmark, and, in order to anticipate any hostile move from Copenhagen, the British government despatched Earl Whitworth in August on a special mission to Copenhagen. The Danes not being ready for war, his mission staved off hostilities for about a year. In 1807, after the second battle of Copenhagen, the British captured Freja and took her into the Royal Navy as HMS Freya.

Terpsichore then sailed for the Mediterranean. On 18 October, an Anglo-Portuguese squadron shared in the capture of the Ragusan polacca Madonna Della Gratia e San Gaetano, which was carrying plate, amongst other cargo. The British vessels were Alexander, Terpsichore, Bonne Citoyenne, and Incendiary, and the Portuguese vessels, Principe Real, Reynha de Portugal, Alfonso di Albuquerque, and the corvette Benjamin.

Terpsichore then had a succession of different commanders over the next five years. Captain John Mackellar took command in 1801, transferring from Jamaica, sailing Terpsichore to the East Indies in June that year with dispatches and a large quantity of specie.

In December Terpsichore was at Bombay undergoing repairs when the East India Company (EIC) Governor of the Bombay Presidency received a warning from the Portuguese authorities that they feared that the French were going to try and take Daman and Diu. HMS Intrepid was also undergoing repairs at Bombay so Mackellar volunteered his services. The EIC gave him command of the 48-gun Marquis Cornwallis, and a small flotilla consisting of the country ship Upton Castle, Betsey (an armed HEIC brig), some other vessels, and 1000 troops. The expedition sailed to Daman and Diu to persuade the Portuguese governor to resist any French incursion. The governor accepted the British reinforcements, which, as it turned out, were not needed.

Then on 27 March 1802 the authorities in Bombay received news that the Governor, the Honourable Johnathan Duncan, while negotiating with local princes in Gujarat, had come under attack and had had to take refuge at Surat. The Political Department then instructed Mackelllar to take Terpsichore, HMS Trident, and two Indiamen, and sail to Goa. There he met with Sir William Clarke, who was conducting a siege of the city. Mackellar loaded 3000 troops from the siege and within seven days of leaving Bombay had arrived at Surat. The troops enabled Duncan to regain control of the area. Terpischore and Mackellar then returned to the siege of Goa.

Mackellar was court-martialled on 20–26 May 1802 and dismissed the service for violating the Second (drunkenness and scandalous conduct) and Thirty-third (failure to follow orders while on shore) Articles of War. (Note: In 1804 he became for six years the governor of the naval hospital at Halifax (Melville Island (Nova Scotia)). He returned to the Navy in 1815, commanded several vessels, and eventually became an Admiral.)

== Napoleonic Wars ==
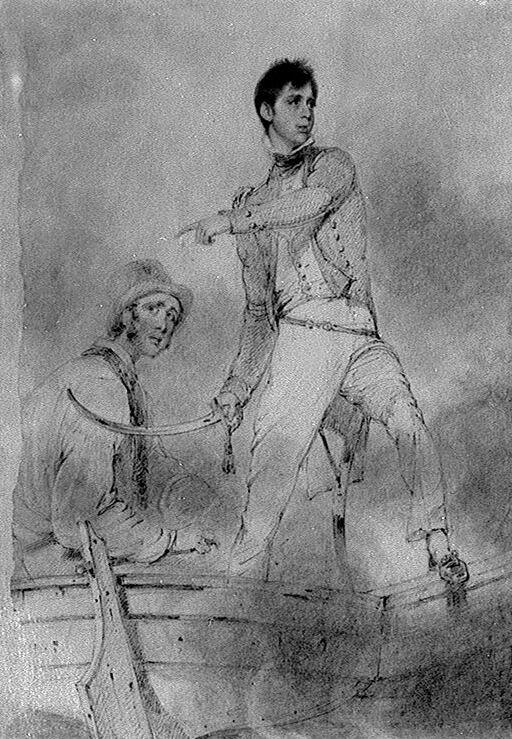
Fleetwood Pellew (right) on one of Terpsichore's boats during the raid on Batavia

In 1803 Terpsichore came under Captain James Vashon, who was succeeded the following year by Captain Walter Bathurst. Bathurst captured the privateer Zephyr in the East Indies on 27 August 1804, before being succeeded in April 1805 by Captain Henry Lambert. Commander Joseph Bogue may have been in charge of Terpsichore until his death in July 1806, or possibly serving alongside Captain William Lye. Thereafter Terpsichore was commanded by several lieutenants in an acting capacity, starting with Lieutenant Augustus Collins in 1807, who captured the 12-gun Jaseur on 10 July 1807. Lieutenant William Wells took over later in 1807, and in 1808 command passed to Captain William Augustus Montagu.

On 28 January 1808 Terpsichore was at Calcutta. News had been received of the outbreak of war between Great Britain and Denmark. Captain Elliot of Modeste sent his boats, together with those of Terpsichore and Dasher up the Hooghly River to Serampore to seize the seven Danish merchant vessels there. (Note: The seven were Waldemarr, Elizabeth, Freya, Holstein, Maria, Mary, and Nymphe.)

=== Sémillante ===
On 15 March 1808 Terpsichore was sailing some 60 miles off Ceylon when a mysterious sail was spotted coming up fast. The ship came up at 5.50 that evening, hoisted English colours and fired a shot, before changing tack. She fired a second shot at 6.45, at which Montagu hauled up and hove-to. As the strange ship approached, Montagu was able to determine her to be hostile, and Terpsichore opened fire, which was returned and a general action began. The enemy ship, which was the 40-gun French frigate Sémillante under Captain Léonard-Bernard Motard, closed at 7.10 and threw some combustible materials onto the deck, which caused a large explosion amongst boxes of powder. The explosion unmanned four guns and started fires, which the officers and men of Terpsichore struggled with but successfully extinguished. The two ships exchanged fire for sometime, each trying to manoeuvre into an advantageous position, until Sémillante ceased fire at 8 and bore round to escape. The reason for this was that Sémillante apparently suffered an explosion in a room near the magazine during the action. To reduce risk, the crew flooded the magazine, leaving her without usable powder, Sémillante had no choice but to break off the action with Terpsichore and return to port. Terpsichore had been badly damaged in her sails and rigging, but gave chase, and for the next four days pursued the fleeing French. By 20 March most of the damage to Terpsichore had been repaired, and she was fast closing on the French ship, under fire from her stern-chasers. The French eventually resorted to throwing overboard her boats, lumber, water and provisions and so Sémillante was finally able to pull away and escape her pursuers. Terpsichore's losses were almost entirely caused by the explosion of the powder boxes, and amounted to one lieutenant and twenty men killed and twenty-two wounded, two of them mortally.

At 2am in morning of the 20th, Terpsichore sighted a sail, which Montagu initially believed was Sémillante. However, the vessel turned out to be the brig Cadry, a prize to Piémontaise. (Note: Piémontaise had struck to HMS St Fiorenzo on 8 March.) Montagu put a prize crew on board Cadry and sent her into Madras. Terpsichore herself returned to Point de Galle.

A report from Île de France stated that the principle damage to Sémillante was due to an explosion in a room near the magazine, during the action. To reduce risk, the crew flooded the magazine; without usable powder, Sémillante had no choice but to attempt to break off the action with Terpsichore and return to port. Sémillante reportedly had five men killed and six wounded, including Motard, who may have had to have his arm amputated. It is not clear from the report how many casualties were due to the action and how many to the explosion. Sémillante was so seriously damaged that the French removed her armament and decommissioned her on 10 July.

During this action the future French Admiral Charles Baudin was severely wounded, losing an arm. Baudin recounts, in his memoirs, the kindnesses showed to him by an Englishwoman, wife of Captain Skene, master of the Gilwell, a prize Sémillante had taken earlier.

=== Return to England ===
Terpsichore was refitted, and remained in the Indian Ocean until she returned to Britain with a convoy. On 15 February 1809 she sailed from Point de Galle with HMS Culloden escorting a fleet of 15 East Indiamen bound for England.

On 14 March, off Mauritius, a gale developed. Four of the ships, Bengal, Calcutta, Jane, Duchess of Gordon, and Lady Jane Dundas, parted company with the main convoy. They were never heard of again.

== Later years ==
On her return to England, Terpsichore was fitted as a receiving ship at Chatham in December 1810. She spent between 1812 and 1813 laid up there in ordinary. She was at Portsmouth between 1814 and 1815, and spent her last years at Chatham between 1816 and 1829. She was broken up at Chatham in November 1830.
