= Pallas-class frigate (1791) =

Royal Navy frigate class

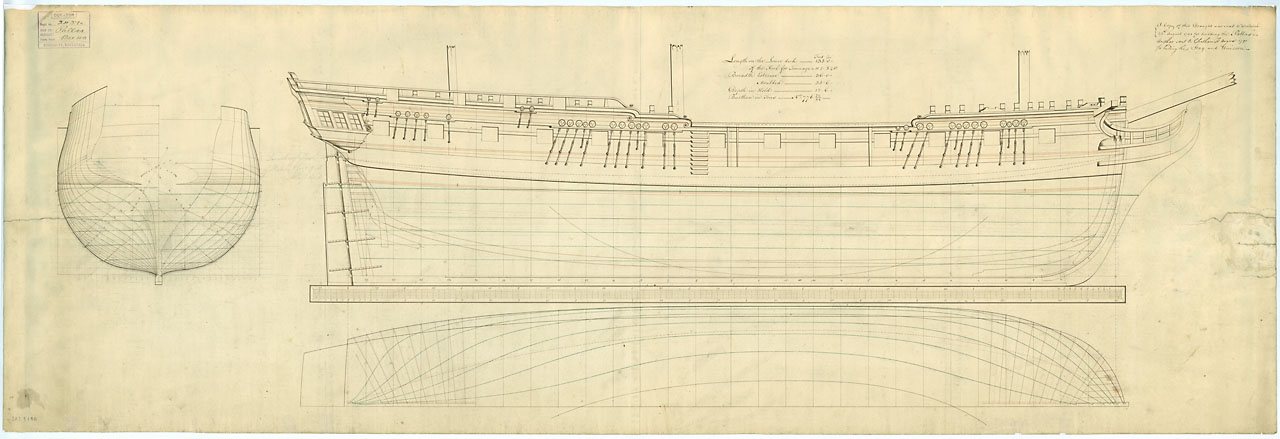
- Pallas-class frigate

Class overview
- Name: Pallas class
- Operators: Royal Navy
- Preceded by: Perseverance class
- Succeeded by: Artois class
- Completed: 3
- Lost: 2

General characteristics
- Type: Frigate
- Tons burthen: 776 77/94 bm (as designed)
- Length: 135 ft 0 in (41.1 m) (gundeck); 112 ft 8 1/4 in (34.3 m) (keel)
- Beam: 36 ft 0 in (11.0 m)
- Depth of hold: 12 ft 6 in (3.81 m)
- Sail plan: Full-rigged ship
- Complement: 257 (altered in 1796 to 254)
- Armament: Upper deck: 26 × 18-pounder guns; Qd: 4 × 6-pounder guns + 4 × 32-pounder carronades; Fc:2 × 6-pounder bow chasers + 2 × 32-pounder carronades

The Pallas-class frigates were a series of three frigates built to a 1791 design by John Henslow, which served in the Royal Navy during the French Revolutionary and Napoleonic Wars.

The trio were all dockyard-built in order to use spare shipbuilding capacity. The orders were originally assigned in December 1790 to the Royal Dockyards at Plymouth and Portsmouth, but in February 1791 the orders were transferred to Chatham and Woolwich Dockyards respectively. They were the first and only 32-gun Royal Navy frigates designed to be armed with the eighteen-pounder cannon on their upper deck, the main gun deck of a frigate.

== Ships in class ==
- HMS Stag
  - Builder: Chatham Royal Dockyard
  - Ordered: 9 December 1790
  - Laid down: March 1792
  - Launched: 12 July 1794
  - Completed: 5 October 1794
  - Fate: Wrecked in a storm in Vigo Bay 6 September 1800, and burnt the next day.
- HMS Unicorn
  - Builder: Chatham Royal Dockyard
  - Ordered: 9 December 1790
  - Laid down: March 1792
  - Launched: 12 July 1794
  - Completed: 5 October 1794
  - Fate: Broken up March 1815 at Deptford Dockyard.
- HMS Pallas
  - Builder: Woolwich Royal Dockyard
  - Ordered: 9 December 1790
  - Laid down: May 1792
  - Launched: 19 December 1793
  - Completed: 5 March 1794.
  - Fate: Wrecked in a storm in Cawsand Bay, Cornwall on 4 April 1798
