= Action of 26 April 1797 =

Minor naval engagement during the French Revolutionary Wars

- Part of the French Revolutionary Wars
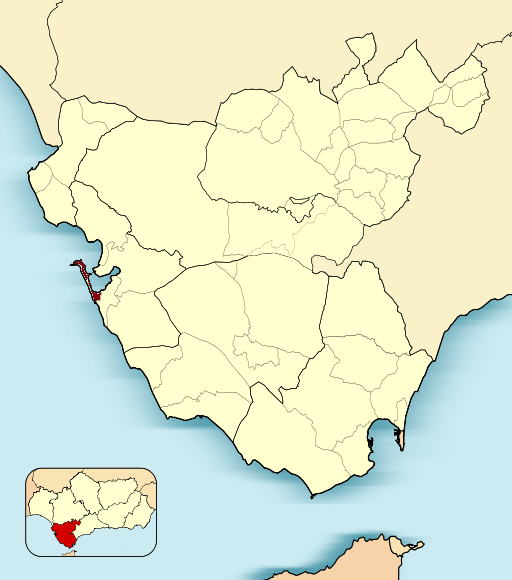
- Cádiz (in red), with the site of the battle marked
| Date | 26 April 1797 |
| Location | Conil Bay, Spain |
| Result | British victory |

Belligerents
| Great Britain | Spain |

Commanders and leaders
| George Martin | |

Strength
| ship of the line HMS Irresistible and frigate HMS Emerald | frigates Santa Elena and Ninfa |

Casualties and losses
| 1 killed, 1 wounded | 18 killed, 30 wounded. Santa Elena destroyed and Ninfa captured |

The action of 26 April 1797 was a minor naval engagement during the French Revolutionary Wars in which a Spanish convoy of two frigates was trapped and defeated off the Spanish town of Conil de la Frontera by British ships of the Cádiz blockade. The British vessels, the ship of the line HMS Irresistible and the Fifth-rate frigate HMS Emerald, were significantly more powerful than the Spanish frigates, which were on the last stage of a voyage carrying treasure from Havana, Cuba, to the Spanish fleet base of Cádiz.

The British commander, Captain George Martin, succeeded in chasing the Spanish vessels into the rocky Conil Bay, where they surrendered after a brief engagement in which the Spanish suffered significantly higher casualties than the British. One of the Spanish ships, the Santa Elena, was subsequently wrecked on the shore, while the other, the Ninfa, was captured and later recommissioned into the Royal Navy. The treasure carried on board the frigates, however, had been removed by a Spanish fishing boat before the battle and so did not fall into British hands.

== Background ==
In late 1796, with the French Revolutionary Wars three years old, a major shift occurred in the conflict when the Kingdom of Spain, until that point an enemy of the French Republic, abruptly changed sides following the signing of the Treaty of San Ildefonso. This reversal forced the British Royal Navy to retire from the Mediterranean Sea to preserve its lines of communication, falling back to the mouth of the Tagus River near Lisbon. From the Tagus, pressure was placed on the Spanish Navy by the erstwhile British Mediterranean Fleet under Vice-Admiral Sir John Jervis, who organised a blockade of the main Spanish fleet base at Cádiz on the country's Southern Atlantic coast. This resulted in the Battle of Cape St. Vincent on 14 February 1797, when Jervis inflicted a stinging defeat on the Spanish fleet. The surviving Spanish ships limped back to Cádiz after the battle, and to ensure that they could not sail again without risking a repeat action, Jervis arranged a close blockade of the port so that by April there were 21 British ships of the line and numerous frigates watching the Spanish fleet at anchor.

The blockade of Cádiz was designed not only to contain the main Spanish fleet, but also to disrupt Spanish communications and transport. Cádiz was the principal port of Southern Spain and thus an important destination for shipping from across the Spanish Empire. This included numerous so-called "treasure ships", heavily armed warships that convoyed the gold and silver from the Spanish colonies in the Americas to the Spanish mainland. For centuries, Spanish treasure ships had been the ultimate prize for Royal Navy captains, and the sums of prize money involved were enormous. In October 1799 for example, a Spanish treasure convoy was captured off Vigo and the British captains alone were awarded £40,730 each (the equivalent of £4,022,300 as of 2025).

== Battle ==
At 06:00 on 26 April 1797, the 74-gun ship of the line HMS Irresistible under Captain George Martin and the 36-gun frigate HMS Emerald under Captain Velters Cornewall Berkeley were sailing at the southern edge of Jervis' (now known as Earl St. Vincent) fleet. While cruising close to the Spanish coast two unknown ships were sighted. Martin immediately ordered his ships to give chase and the strangers fled with Martin's vessels in pursuit. The new arrivals were two Spanish 34-gun frigates, the Santa Elena and Ninfa, bound to Cádiz from Havana with a cargo of silver specie. The captains of these Spanish ships had unwittingly sailed into the midst of the blockade fleet the previous night, but had had a fortunate encounter with a Spanish fishing vessel which had warned them of the danger. Acting quickly, the captains off-loaded their treasure into the fishing boat with instructions to carry it safely into Cádiz.

The Spanish captains, recognising that they were outmatched by the larger British vessels, attempted to shelter in Conil Bay, a rocky stretch of coastline near the village of Conil de la Frontera to the north of Cape Trafalgar. At 14:30 they were discovered by Martin's ships, which had to carefully negotiate a large rock formation known as the Laja de Cape Rocha which protected the head of the bay. With this obstacle successfully behind them, Irresistible and Emerald attacked the anchored Spanish frigates broadside to broadside. The action lasted an hour and a half, with the Spanish ships taking much the worst of the damage. At 16:00, both battered Spanish vessels surrendered, although as the British ships launched boats to take possession of their prizes, the crew of Santa Elena hacked through the anchor cables and allowed their ship to drift onto the rocky shoreline where they disembarked and escaped inland.

== Aftermath ==
Martin ordered Ninfa to be secured by his men and Santa Elena to be towed off the rocks with the intention of salvaging the vessel. The tow succeeded in freeing the wrecked ship, but she sank soon afterwards in the deeper water of Conil Bay. All of the treasure which the Spanish frigates had carried was subsequently safely transported into Cádiz by the fishing boat whose secret cargo was not suspected by the British blockade forces. Spanish losses in the engagement amounted to 18 killed and 30 wounded, the British losing one man killed and one wounded on Irresistible. Ninfa was subsequently purchased by the Royal Navy and commissioned as the 36-gun frigate HMS Hamadryad. In his dispatch to the Admiralty regarding the action, Earl St. Vincent noted that the action was "one of the most notable that had ever come under my observation". The blockade of Cádiz remained in force with varying degrees of intensity for the remainder of the year, with the British fleet retiring to the Tagus during the winter.
