= HMS Florentina =

Frigate of the Spanish Navy (1787–1800) and Royal Navy (1800–1803)

History

Spain
- Name: Santa Florentina
- Namesake: Saint Florentina
- Builder: Arsenal de Cartagena, Cartagena, Spain
- Laid down: 3 January 1786
- Launched: 21 December 1786 (see text)
- Commissioned: 1787
- Fate: Captured 7 April 1800

Great Britain
- Name: HMS Florentina
- Namesake: Truncation of Spanish name
- Acquired: By capture 7 April 1800
- Honours and awards: Naval General Service Medal (NGSM) with clasp "Egypt"
- Fate: Sold 1803

General characteristics
- Tons burthen: 90178/94 (bm)
- Length: 146 ft 8 in (44.7 m) (overall); 119 ft 6 in (36.4 m) (keel)
- Beam: 37 ft 8 in (11.5 m)
- Depth of hold: 10 ft 6 in (3.2 m)
- Complement: At capture: 114; British service: 260
- Armament: Spanish service; Upperdeck: 26 × 12-pounder guns; QD: 6 × 4-pounder guns; Fc: 2 × 4-pounder guns; British service; Upperdeck: 26 × 12-pounder guns; QD: 6 × 6-pounder guns; Fc: 2 × 6-pounder guns

HMS Florentina (sometimes referred to as Florentia or Florentine in historical documents), was a frigate of the British Royal Navy in service from 1800 to 1802. She previously served in the Spanish Navy as Santa Florentina from 1787 until the British captured her in 1800.

In the Spanish Navy, Santa Florentina was named for Saint Florentina (d. ca. 612), a saint venerated by the Catholic Church. Santa Florentina operated against the Moors in North Africa and served during the French Revolutionary Wars in both the War of the First Coalition and the War of the Second Coalition. During the latter conflict, the Royal Navy captured her in the Action of 7 April 1800 and took her into service as HMS Florentina.

In British service, Florentina operated in the Mediterranean Sea, including in the Egyptian campaign in 1801, until she returned to the United Kingdom in 1802 after the Treaty of Amiens. There the British Admiralty had her laid-up in ordinary in 1802 and she was sold in 1803.

== Construction ==
The Director of Construction at the Arsenal de Cartagena in Cartagena, Spain, Brigadier José Joaquín Romero y Fernández de Landa, designed Santa Florentina, modifying the design from his earlier one of the frigate Santa Casilda. He submitted the design to Minister of the Navy Antonio Valdés y Fernández Bazán on 17 October 1785 for approval. Santa Florentina′s keel was laid down at the Arsenal de Cartagena on 3 January 1786. Sources differ on the date she was launched, claiming 21 December 1786, 1 March 1787, and 4 March 1787, but her first voyage began in March 1787, indicating that her launch must have occurred in December 1786 to allow time for her fitting-out and completion prior to beginning that voyage. She was commissioned in March 1787.

== Spanish Navy service ==
=== 1787–1800 ===
In March 1787, Santa Florentina became the flagship of a division consisting of herself and two other frigates under the overall command of Jefe de escuadra (Squadron Commander) Francisco de Borja y del Poyo. The division formed at Cartagena and sailed that month to Cádiz, Spain. Santa Florentina departed Cádiz on 19 April 1787, and conducted sea trials.

Santa Florentina subsequently made several voyages with the training squadron of Teniente generale (Lieutenant General) Juan Francisco de Lángara y Huarte Arizmendi Trejo, which also included the frigates Santa Brígida, Santa Cecilia, Colón, Nuestra Señora de la Paz, Santa Rosa, Santa Casilda, Santa Teresa, and Santa Escolástica, the brig Flecha, and the sloops-of-war Grulla and Ventura. The squadron called at Barcelona, Spain, from 19 to 21 May 1787, then sailed to North African waters off Algiers, where they conducted exercises. They returned to Barcelona on 31 July 1787. The ships made additional voyages in the Mediterranean Sea before they arrived at Cádiz on 30 August 1787 to await the arrival of the ship of the line Conde de Regla. After Conde de Regla joined the squadron, the ships set sail from Cádiz on 6 September 1787. They operated off Cape St. Vincent, then returned to Cádiz on the 17 September 1787. Santa Florentina′s frigate division then disembarked the Aragón Volunteer Regiment at Oran in North Africa before returning to Cartagena.

Santa Florentina and the ship of the line San Fulgencio embarked Spanish Army troops of the España Regiment at Barcelona for transportation to Palma de Mallorca on Mallorca in the Balearic Islands. They reached Palma de Mallorca on 10 January 1788 and discharged the soldiers. In 1788, Santa Florentina was part of a training squadron that carried out several maneuvers under the command of Jefe de escuadra (Squadron Commander) José de Córdoba y Ramos, conducting exercises and comparing the performance of different ship designs. In 1789, she transported Spanish consuls to Algiers and Tunis. She was assigned to the Cartagena naval department in 1790, and on 16 April 1790 Capitán de fragata (Frigate Captain) Baltasar Hidalgo de Cisneros y de la Torre — a future almirante (admiral) — became her commanding officer. She operated as part of a squadron formed in the aftermath of the Nootka Crisis of 1789 between Spain and the Kingdom of Great Britain and conducted several operations in the Atlantic Ocean and the Mediterranean Sea.

Santa Florentina sailed from Palma de Mallorca on 25 November 1790 bound for Algeciras, Spain, where she arrived on 7 December 1790. She departed Algeciras as part of a squadron — which also included the frigates Santa Perpetua and Santa Rosalía, the xebecs Santa San Blas, San Leandro, and África, 44 gunboats, and other, smaller vessels — to come to the relief of Ceuta on the coast of North Africa, which was under siege by the Moors. She returned to Cádiz in late July 1791, then set sail for Cartagena in early September 1791.

On 28 February 1793 Santa Florentina sailed from Cádiz with the ships of the line Real Carlos and Gallardo. They arrived in Cartagena on 10 April 1793. Santa Florentina then headed for the coast of Catalonia, where she joined the Rosas naval station flotilla, which was under the overall command of now Capitán de navío (Ship-of-the-Line Captain) Baltasar Hidalgo de Cisneros. She captured the Dutch brig Andrea Elizabet, which was carrying a cargo of gunpowder to Mogador, in 1793. On 2 April 1794, she sailed from Cartagena to transport Prince Louis, Crown Prince of Parma and Piacenza, from Leghorn (Livorno) to Barcelona as part of the squadron of Juan Francisco de Lángara. By the end of September 1794, she was at Cádiz as part of the Oceanic Squadron.

In March 1795 Santa Florentina began patrols mission along the coast of North Africa. On 17 April 1795, she sailed to Algeciras as part of a division that also included the frigate Ceres and the brig Galgo. She returned to Cádiz on 2 July 1795.

In July 1796 Santa Florentina sailed in company with the frigate Esmeralda from Cádiz to Pasajes (Pasaia), Spain. A war with the Kingdom of Great Britain broke out in October 1796 when Spain entered the War of the First Coalition as an ally of France, and the two frigates arrived at Ferrol, Spain, that month. Putting back to sea from Ferrol, Santa Florentina, Esmeralda, and the brig Palomo arrived at La Coruña (A Coruña), Spain, on 8 February 1797.

Santa Florentina sailed in company with the frigate Medea from La Coruña in April 1797 for a transatlantic voyage. They arrived at Montevideo in the Viceroyalty of the Río de la Plata on 9 December 1797 to collect funds. During the voyage, with the support of Medea, she captured what one sourece identifies as the British corvette Duke of Cumberland, which the Spanish later sold at Montevideo. Escorted by the frigate Santa Clara, Santa Florentina and Medea sailed from Montevideo on 11 January 1798 carrying three million pesos. The three frigates arrived at La Coruña on 31 March 1798. In April 1798, Santa Florentina sailed to Ferrol.

In June 1798, the War of the Second Coalition broke out, again pitting Spain as an ally of France against the Kingdom of Great Britain. On 4 January 1799, Santa Florentina sailed from Ferrol as part of a squadron transporting arms, troops, and supplies to the Canary Islands. She returned with the squadron to Ferrol in February 1799.

=== Capture ===
During March 1800 the Spanish authorities in Cádiz prepared a convoy made up of 13 merchant ships bound for ports in Spanish America — Lima in the Viceroyalty of Peru, Buenos Aires and Montevideo in the Viceroyalty of the Río de la Plata, and Veracruz in the Viceroyalty of New Spain. Santa Florentina, under Capitán de fragata (Frigate Captain) Manuel Norates, and the 34-gun frigates Nuestra Señora del Carmén and Santa Sabina were assigned to escort the convoy, and all three of them had new copper sheathing on their hulls for the voyage. Each frigate also carried cargo for Lima, including quicksilver for use in the Peruvian silver mining industry. Santa Florentina carried 1,500 quintals of quicksilver, sundry "Cards", and five 24-pounder (10.9 kg) field guns intended for use ashore, while Nuestra Señora del Carmén's cargo consisted of 1,500 quintals of quicksilver, "sundries of Cards," and four 24-pounder (10.9 kg) field guns. All three frigates carried provisions for a four-month voyage. With the Archbishop of Buenos Aires, Pedro Ynsencio Bejarano, embarked as a passenger aboard Nuestra Señora del Carmén, the convoy sailed from Cádiz on 3 April 1800 bound for a stop in the Canary Islands.

In April 1800, a British squadron under Rear-Admiral John Thomas Duckworth consisting of the 74-gun ships of the line HMS Leviathan and HMS Swiftsure, the 36-gun frigate HMS Emerald, and the fireship HMS Incendiary was on blockade duty off Cadiz. On 5 April the squadron sighted the Spanish convoy and gave chase, capturing Spanish merchant ships over the next two days. On 7 April, the British again sighted Santa Florentina and Nuestra Señora del Carmén, and eventually Leviathan and Emerald opened fire on their rigging to disable them; shortly afterward, both Spanish frigates surrendered. During the action, Santa Florentina's 114-man crew sustained casualties of 12 killed and 10 wounded, with Norates and her second captain among the wounded, while Nuestra Señora del Carmén's crew of 140 suffered 11 men killed and 16 wounded. The British reported no casualties.

When the action concluded, the British sailed for Gibraltar with their prizes. On arrival they encountered Incendiary, which had made port the previous day with two captured vessels of her own. In all, the British squadron captured nine merchant ships along with the two frigates between 5 and 7 April 1800.

== Royal Navy service ==
Commander John Broughton, formerly of the bomb vessel HMS Strombolo, was appointed to "the Florentia [sic] frigate, of 36 guns, now off Malta," as the ship's commanding officer, and she was commissioned into Royal Navy service as HMS Florentina.

On 5 December 1800 Florentina was in company with the sloop-of-war HMS Cynthia and the gunvessel HMS Urchin when the three ships captured the French polacre Union, bound from Alexandria, Egypt, to France with a cargo of rice and coffee. On 7 December, the same three vessels captured the French brig Bon Pasteur Retrouve which was sailing on the same route with a cargo of rice, coffee, and sugar. On 13 December, the same three vessels captured the French brig Heureuse Clairon and her cargo of rice and coffee.

On 8 January 1801 the frigate HMS Penelope captured the French bombard St. Roche, which was carrying wine, liqueurs, ironware, Delfth cloth, and various other merchandise from Marseille, France, to Alexandria. Florentina, Swiftsure, the ships of the line HMS Tigre, HMS Minotaur, and HMS Northumberland, and the schooner HMS Malta were in sight and shared in the proceeds of the capture.

In March 1801 Florentina was at the British landing at Abu Qir Bay. She is not among the vessels listed as having suffered casualties in the landing. For his services there, Broughton received a gold medal from Sultan Selim III of the Ottoman Empire. Broughton received a promotion to post-captain on 3 August 1801. Because Florentina served in the Royal Navy's Egyptian campaign between 8 March and 2 September 1801, her officers and crew qualified for the clasp "Egypt" to the Naval General Service Medal that the British Admiralty authorised in 1850 for all surviving claimants. (Note: A first-class share of the prize money awarded in April 1823 was worth £34 2s 4d; a fifth-class share, that of a seaman, was worth 3s 11½d. The amount was small as the total had to be shared between 79 vessels and the entire British Army contingent.)

Florentina arrived at Portsmouth, England, on 28 May 1802 with dispatches from Malta. She sailed eastward on 11 June 1802 to be paid off. She arrived at Deptford on 17 June 1802 and was laid up.

== Disposal ==
The Principal Officers and Commissioners of His Majesty's Navy offered "Florentina, 943 Tons, Copper-bottomed, lying at Deptford", for sale on 1 December 1802. She did not sell until 1803.
