= Velters Cornewall Berkeley =

Royal Navy officer

Captain Velters Cornewall Berkeley
- Born: c. 1754
- Died: 1804 (aged 50) Oxford
- Allegiance: Kingdom of Great Britain; United Kingdom
- Branch: Royal Navy
- Conflicts: American Revolutionary War; French Revolutionary Wars

Velters Cornewall Berkeley (c. 1754–1804) was an officer in the Royal Navy. He served in both the American and French Revolutionary Wars but never rose above the rank of Captain. He died at his home in Oxford in 1804, aged 50.

== Family ==
Velters Cornewall Berkeley was born in 1754, to Lionel Spencer Berkeley and Margaret Whitfield. He was one of the couple's five sons, two of whom died as infants.

== Career ==
As a lieutenant, Berkeley commanded the 14-gun cutter Liberty in the North Sea between April 1780 and October 1782. He was master and commander of the 14-gun Cygnet, a ship-sloop of the Swan-class, between July and August 1783. From 1784 he commanded the 14-gun Falcon in the Leeward Islands, then in March 1786 became temporary acting captain of the 38-gun frigate HMS Latona but did not make post and returned to the rank of commander in October. His last command as a lieutenant was in April 1790, serving in The Channel in the 16-gun HMS Fury. Berkeley was promoted to captain in September 1790 but remained in charge of Fury until November.

In April 1793, Berkeley was given command of his first rated-ship, the 44-gun frigate Assurance, and sailed to the Mediterranean in February 1794. In May, he joined Jervis' fleet in the West Indies.

=== Invasion of Guadeloupe ===
Shortly after 5 April, Assurance joined Sir John Jervis' fleet at Martinique, in time to take part in the assault on Guadeloupe. Jervis' ships and 6,100 troops under Lieutenant-general Sir Charles Grey had captured the island in March and followed it up with a successful invasion of St Lucia on 4 April. Returning briefly to Martinique to collect reinforcements, including Berkeley and his crew, Jervis then took his fleet to Guadeloupe, forcing the capitulation of Grande-Terre on 12 April and Basse-Terre on 20 April.

Berkeley was in England at the beginning of August 1795, commissioning the newly constructed HMS Emerald. She was taken down the Thames from Northfleet to Woolwich for coppering and fitting-out, and in January 1797 she sailed to join Admiral John Jervis' fleet, then in the Mediterranean.

=== Battle of Cape St Vincent ===
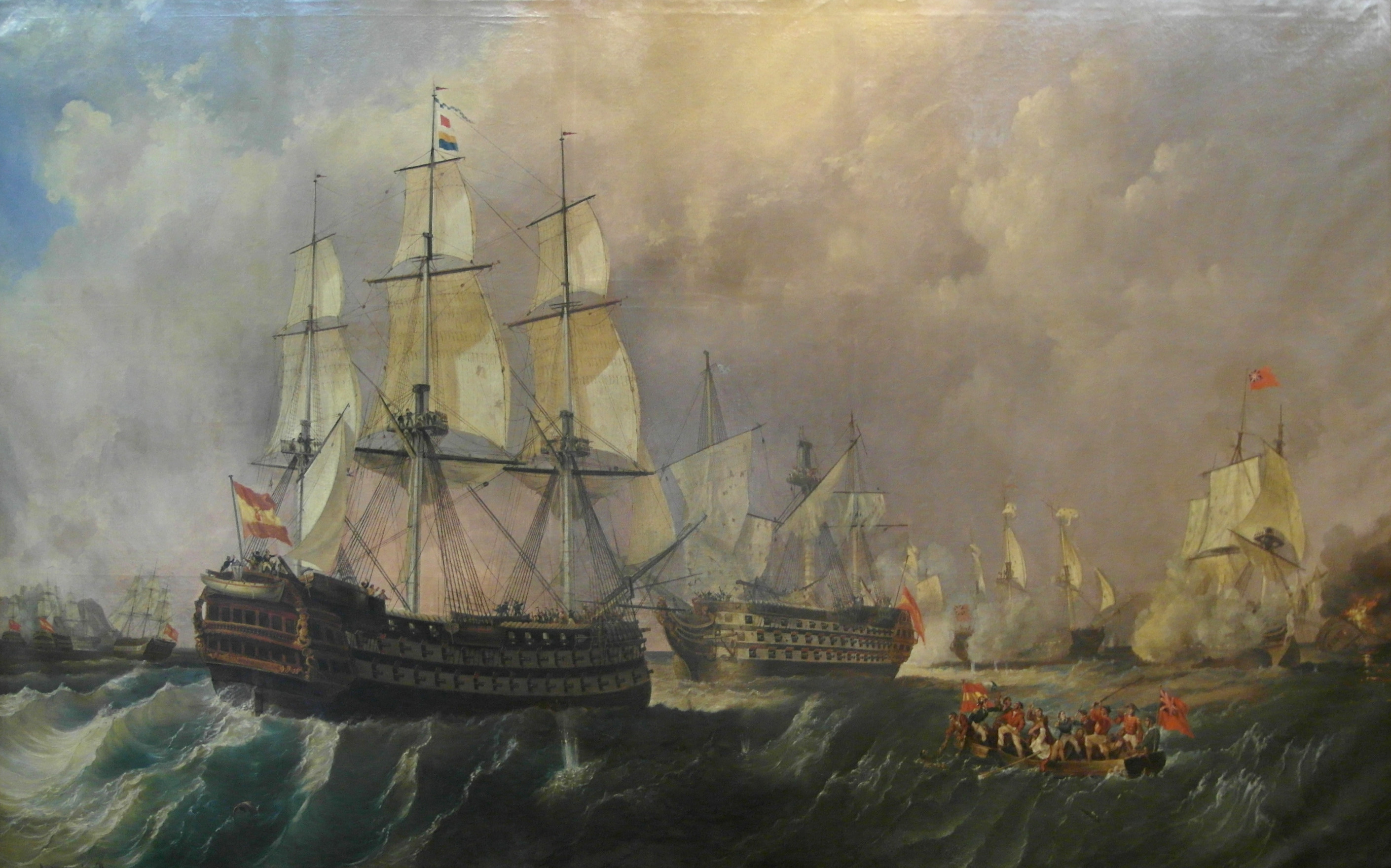
Santisima Trinidad being rescued at the Battle of Cape St Vincent. Afterwards, Berkeley was assigned a squadron to capture her but did not succeed.

Emerald was too lightly built to take part in the Battle of Cape St Vincent, when Jervis' fleet of 15 ships-of-the-line engaged a Spanish fleet of 27 ships-of-the-line. Instead she anchored in nearby Lagos Bay, awaiting the outcome.

On 16 February, the victorious British fleet and its prizes entered the bay. Jervis gave Berkeley command of a squadron of three frigates and two smaller craft and sent him to search for the disabled flagship, Santisima Trinidad of 130 guns, which had been badly damaged and towed from the battle. On 20 February, Berkeley's squadron comprising Emerald, Minerve, and Niger, of 40 and 32 guns respectively, Bonne-Citoyenne of 20 guns, and the 14-gun Raven sighted Santisima Trinidad under tow by a large frigate and in the company of a brig. Even though he was joined shortly after by the 32-gun HMS Terpsichore, Berkeley considered his force insufficient and declined to engage, recalling Minerve and Niger, whose captains were eager to attack.

Berkeley's reluctance infuriated some of his fellow officers who asked for a court-martial. Minerve's captain, George Cockburn, however, came down on Berkeley's side, opining to Jervis that, under a jury rig, Santisima Trinidad was still capable of making a defence.

=== Action of 26 April 1797 ===
Berkeley's Emerald was cruising off the Spanish coast with 74-gun Irresistible when, at 06:00, two enemy frigates were spotted. The Spanish ships Santa Elena and Ninfa had been carrying silver from Havana to Cadiz, but had transferred their cargo the previous night to a fishing boat that had warned them of the proximity of the British fleet.

The Spanish ships ran into Conil Bay, the entrance to which was protected by a large rocky ledge. Irresistible and Emerald rounded the ledge at around 14:30 and engaged the anchored Spanish ships. Ninfa and Santa Elena surrendered at approximately 16:00 with 18 killed and 30 wounded. Irresistible had one killed and one wounded; Emerald had no casualties. The remaining crew of Santa Elena avoided capture by cutting her cables and beaching her on the shore so they could flee on foot. The British managed to drag Santa Elena off the beach but, badly damaged, she sank at sea.

Ninfa was taken into service as HMS Hamadryad, a 36-gun frigate with a main battery of 12-pounders, but the British were unable to retrieve the cargo of silver, which later arrived safely in Cadiz.

In February 1801, Berkeley was given charge of the 74-gun HMS Genereux, an appointment he held for 18 months. The war finished with the Treaty of Amiens in March 1802, and in August Berkeley sailed his ship to Plymouth where she paid off and was laid up in ordinary.

Berkeley died at his home in Oxford, in 1804, aged 50, still a captain.
