= Auguste (1808 privateer) =

French naval vessel

History

France
- Name: Auguste
- Builder: Courau Frères, Bordeaux
- Commissioned: 1808
- Fate: Captured 1811

General characteristics
- Displacement: 300 tons (French)
- Length: 33.1 m (108 ft 7 in)
- Beam: 9.7 m (31 ft 10 in)
- Sail plan: Ship
- Complement: 70
- Armament: 18 × 8-pounder short guns
- Notes: Three-masted

Auguste (or Augusta) was a privateer launched at Bordeaux in 1808. She made three cruises. For her first cruise she was under the command of a Captain Henry, with 70 men and eighteen 8-pounder guns. For her second cruise she was under a Captain La Case. Her third and last cruise took place from December 1810 until her capture on 6 April 1811. She was under the command of Juan Jamays, with 11 officers and 115 men.

Capture: HMS Emerald captured Auguste on 6 April 1811, and brought her into Cork.
