= George Martin (Royal Navy officer) =

Royal Navy officer (1764–1847)

Admiral of the Fleet Sir George Martin GCB GCMG
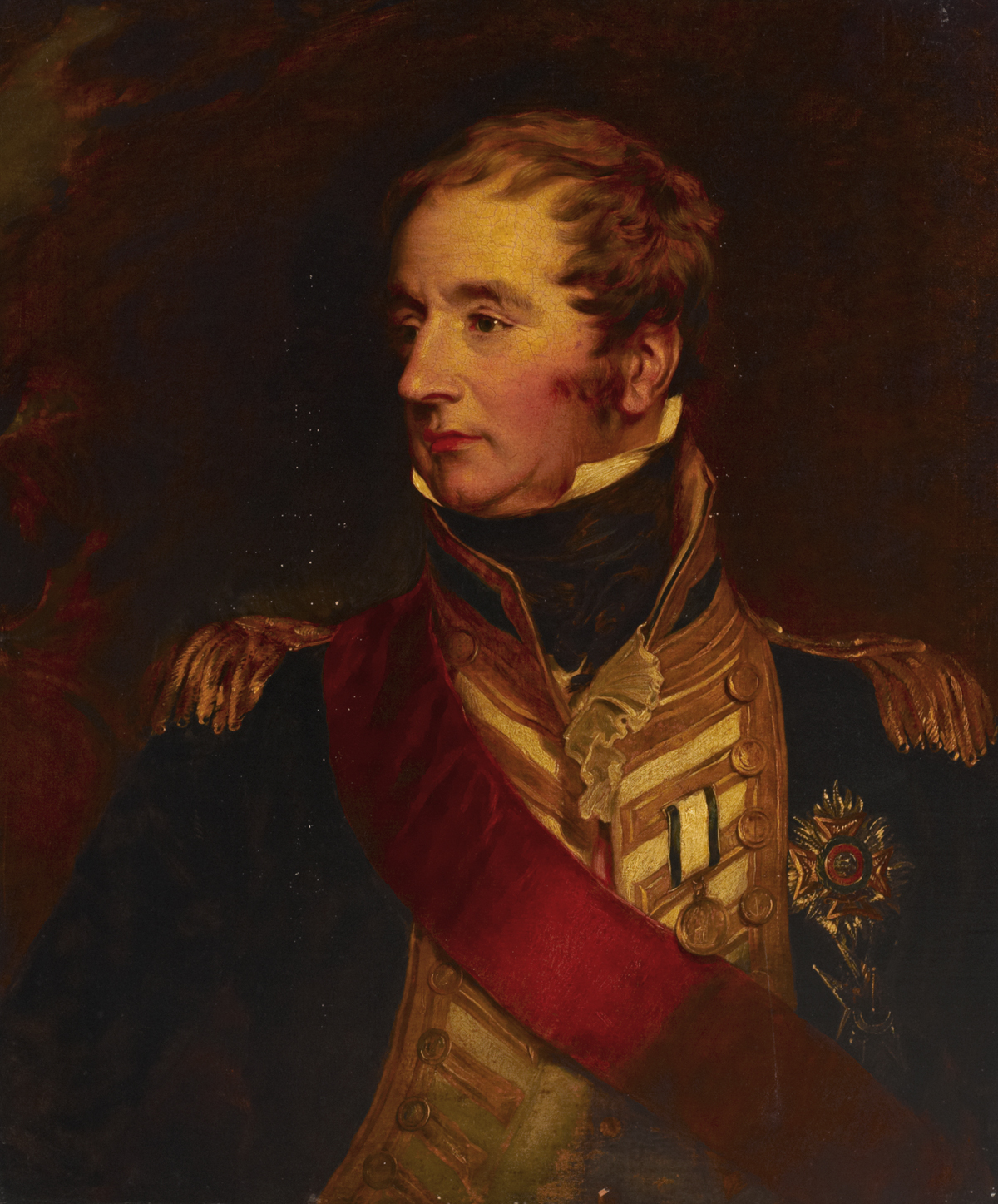
- Portrait by Charles Landseer
- Born: 1764
- Died: 28 July 1847 (aged 82–83); Berkeley Square, Westminster
- Military career
- Allegiance: Great Britain; United Kingdom
- Branch: Royal Navy
- Service years: 1776–1847
- Rank: Admiral of the Fleet
- Commands: HMS Tobago; HMS Preston; HMS Porcupine; HMS Magicienne; HMS Irresistible; HMS Northumberland; HMS Colossus; HMS Glory; HMS Barfleur; Portsmouth Command
- Conflicts: American Revolutionary War; Battle of Ushant (1778); Battle of Grenada; Battle of Martinique (1780); French Revolutionary Wars; Battle of Cape St. Vincent (1797); Napoleonic Wars; Battle of Cape Finisterre (1805)
- Awards: Naval Gold Medal; Knight Bachelor; Knight Grand Cross of the Order of the Bath; Knight Grand Cross of the Order of St Michael and St George; Knight of the Order of Saint Januarius

Admiral of the Fleet Sir George Martin, GCB, GCMG (1764 – 28 July 1847) was an officer of the Royal Navy who saw service during the American War of Independence, and the French Revolutionary and Napoleonic Wars. During his long naval career he took part in several significant battles, for which he was awarded a number of honours and promotions; he commanded ships at the battles of Cape St. Vincent and Cape Finisterre.

George Martin was born into an important naval dynasty, related to the Rowley family, and the grandson of Admiral of the Fleet Sir William Rowley on his mother's side, and great-nephew of Admiral Sir William Martin on his father's side. He spent his early career serving on ships commanded by his uncle, Captain, later Vice-Admiral, Joshua Rowley. He saw action in the West Indies, and had risen to command his own ship by the end of the war with America.

The years of peace temporarily left him unemployed, but the outbreak of war with revolutionary France in 1793 provided the opportunity to impress his superiors. Receiving command of several ships, he fought with Jervis at Cape St. Vincent, and afterwards participated in an action that saw the capture of one Spanish frigate and the destruction of another. He then served in the Mediterranean, at first at the blockade of Malta, and then off Egypt, before going ashore during the temporary peace.

The resumption of hostilities in 1803 saw him returning to service, and in 1805 he saw action at the Battle of Cape Finisterre under Robert Calder. Promoted to rear-admiral shortly afterwards, he provided his testimony for Calder's court-martial, and after a short spell ashore, returned to sea. He took part in the blockade of Cádiz and operations in support of British forces in Italy, before moving ashore towards the end of the wars. He received various promotions and honours, commanding at Portsmouth for several years, and being appointed to a number of chivalric orders. Martin became rear-admiral and then vice-admiral of the United Kingdom towards the end of his life before dying in 1847.

== Family and early life ==
George Martin was born in 1764, the son of William Martin, a captain in the navy, and his wife Arabella, the daughter of Admiral of the Fleet Sir William Rowley. George's great-uncle was Admiral Sir William Martin, who had fought in the War of the Austrian Succession under Admirals Norris and Vernon. His name was entered on the books of the yacht HMS Mary on 13 December 1771, but he did not actually enter the navy until 20 November 1776, when he became a captain's servant aboard his uncle, Joshua Rowley's ship, HMS Monarch. He remained in Rowley's service for several years, rising to able seaman and then midshipman.

== American War of Independence ==
Martin saw action at the Battle of Ushant on 27 July 1778, before transferring with now Rear-Admiral Rowley to the latter's new flagship, the 74-gun HMS Suffolk, on 8 December that year to serve under Captain Hugh Cloberry Christian. Suffolk went out to the West Indies and formed part of Admiral John Byron's fleet at the Battle of Grenada on 6 July 1779. Martin transferred to the 44-gun frigate HMS Actaeon, and then to the 14-gun sloop HMS Chameleon, before joining the sloop HMS Rover under Captain John Thomas Duckworth. Duckworth appointed Martin midshipman and second master's mate during his time on Rover, with Martin seeing action as part of Admiral Sir George Rodney's fleet at the Battle of Martinique and the subsequent engagements off the island during April and May. After these engagements Martin was transferred to Hart, under James Vashon until 15 July 1780, before being appointed as lieutenant aboard the 74-gun HMS Russell under Captain Thomas Hanwell the following day. Martin returned to serving with his old commander, John Thomas Duckworth, aboard the 98-gun HMS Princess Royal, and followed him when he moved to take command of the 44-gun HMS Ulysses on 26 June 1781.

He was then transferred to serve aboard the 90-gun HMS Sandwich, until moving ashore on 30 September 1781. Martin was then promoted to commander and appointed to his first command on 9 March 1782, taking over the sloop Tobago. A further promotion to post-captain followed soon after as he took command of the 50-gun HMS Preston on 17 March 1783. With the draw-down of the navy following the end of the war, Martin sailed Preston back to Britain, and paid her off on 2 April 1784.

== The peace, and the French Revolutionary Wars ==
=== West Indies ===
Martin spent five years without a ship, but returned to service with an appointment to command the 24-gun HMS Porcupine on 9 July 1789. He was active off the coast of Ireland until paying her off on 21 August 1792. The outbreak of the French Revolutionary Wars offered further opportunities for employment, and on 12 March 1793 he took command of the 32-gun HMS Magicienne and joined the squadron based at Jamaica. After his return to England Martin was transferred to take command of the 74-gun HMS Irresistible on 8 February 1795, after her previous captain, Richard Grindall, had been injured at the Battle of Groix. In November Martin was assigned to escort an expedition to the Leeward Islands under Vice-Admiral Sir John Laforey, with a military force commanded by Lieutenant-General Sir Ralph Abercromby. The expedition was forced back to port by violent storms, while a second attempt under Rear-Admiral Hugh Cloberry Christian in December suffered the same fate. The expedition sailed again in March the following year, and succeeded in reaching the West Indies in April, where Irresistible covered the landing of troops. Later that year Irresistible helped to chase the 36-gun French Perçante ashore off San Domingo.

=== Cape St Vincent ===
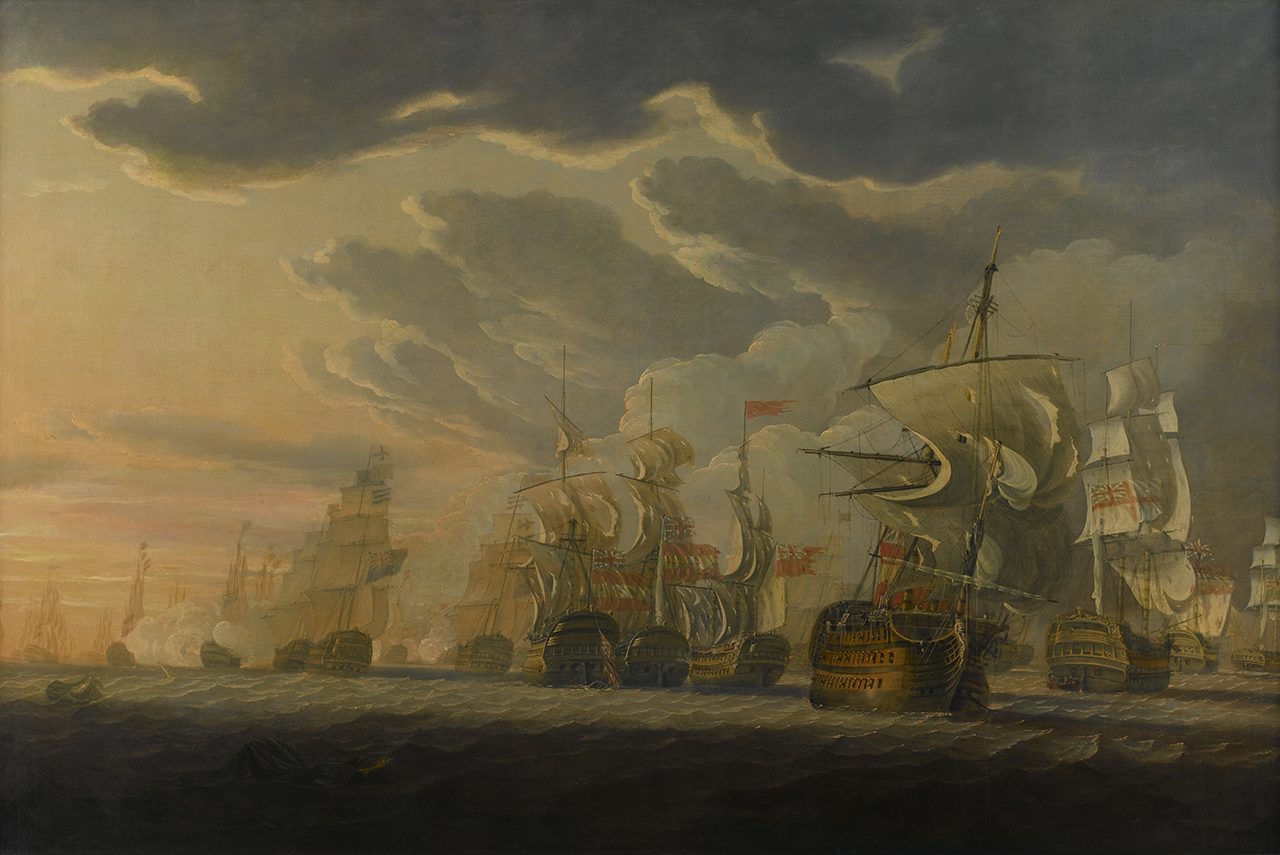
The Battle of Cape St. Vincent, which Martin fought in

Returning to British waters Martin was assigned to Sir John Jervis's fleet, and saw action at the Battle of Cape St. Vincent on 14 February 1797. During the battle Irresistible sustained casualties of five killed and 14 wounded. The 74-gun HMS Captain had been present at the battle flying the flag of Commodore Horatio Nelson. Captain had been badly damaged in the battle, and Nelson transferred his pennant to Irresistible the day after the battle. He remained aboard her until Captain had been repaired, and returned to sea aboard Captain in late March.

=== Ninfa and Santa Elena ===
Martin and Irresistible remained off the Iberian coast, enforcing the blockade of Cádiz. On 26 April 1798 two Spanish frigates, the Ninfa and the Santa Elena were spotted approaching the port. Irresistible, in company with the 36-gun HMS Emerald chased them into Conil Bay and brought them to action at 2 pm. After an hour and a half of fighting the two Spanish ships surrendered, with the Santa Elena being driven onshore and wrecked. The Ninfa was later added to the Royal Navy as HMS Hamadryad. Sir John Jervis was later to record that the skill and daring involved in chasing the Spanish ships past the dangerous reefs at the entrance to the bay made the action "one of the most notable that had ever come under his observation".

=== Mediterranean ===
Martin was assigned to serve with the Channel Fleet under Lord Bridport, after which he transferred to take command of the 74-gun HMS Northumberland on 14 July 1798, serving as the flagship of Sir John Colpoys. He served in the Mediterranean with Rear-Admiral Sir John Duckworth's squadron from June 1799, and the following year was part of the blockade of Malta. He helped to capture the 74-gun Généreux on 18 February that year, after which the Généreux was commissioned into the navy as HMS Genereux and joined the blockading forces. In May Martin became commander of the blockade and on 24 August 1800 the Northumberland, Genereux and HMS Success captured the French frigate Diane off Malta. The French garrison at Valletta surrendered to him in September, after which Martin moved to support Admiral Lord Keith's operations off Egypt. He received the Turkish gold medal in 1802 for his services in this campaign, and came ashore on 21 September with the end of the war following the Peace of Amiens.

== Napoleonic Wars ==
=== Finisterre and flag rank ===
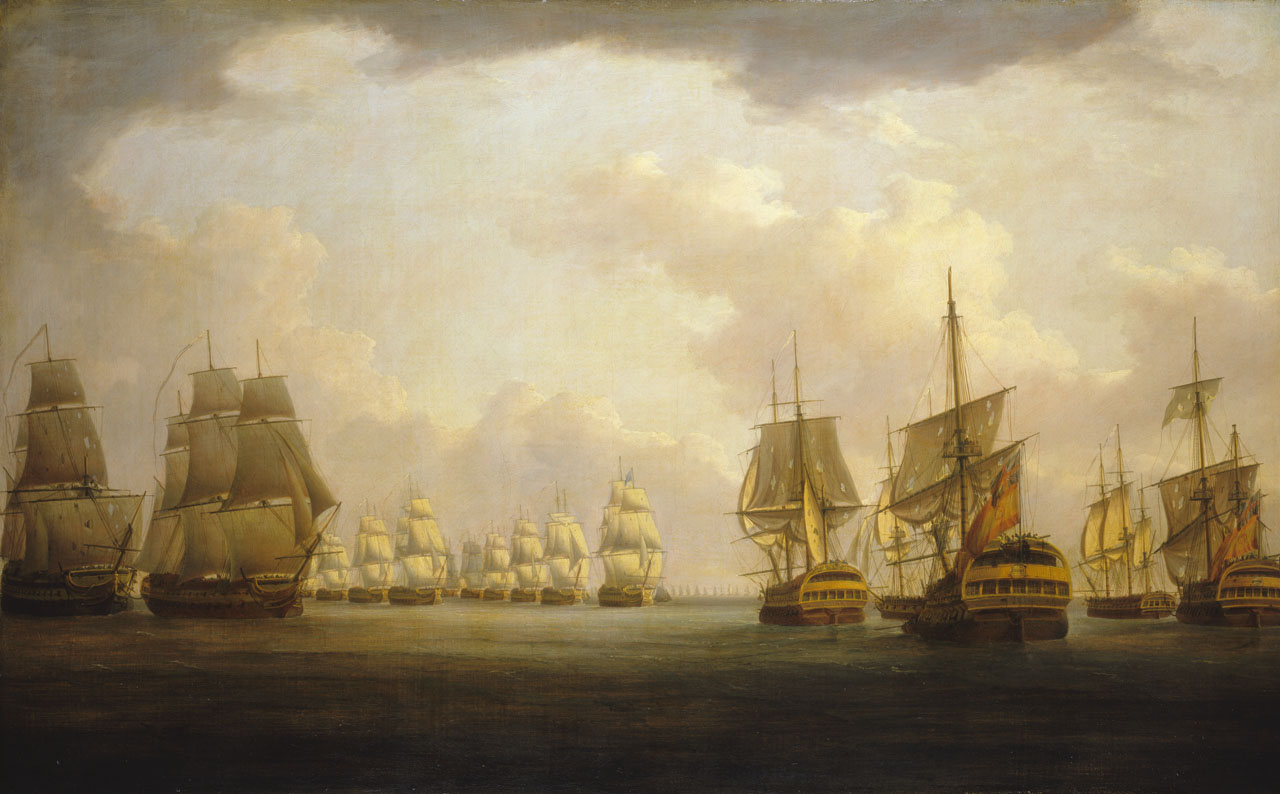
Admiral Sir Robert Calder's action off Cape Finisterre, 23 July 1805. Martin commanded HMS Barfleur during the battle.

Returning to service with the resumption of hostilities in 1803, Martin took command of the 74-gun HMS Colossus on 22 May and joined the Channel Fleet. He was nominated a Colonel of Marines on 23 April 1804, and the following day transferred to the 90-gun HMS Glory. He remained in her until taking command of the 90-gun HMS Barfleur on 21 November, and was still in command when he joined Sir Robert Calder's fleet and took part in the Battle of Cape Finisterre on 22 July 1805. He afterwards resigned his command, on 16 September, and moved ashore, receiving a promotion to rear-admiral on 9 November. He gave evidence in the court-martial in Calder's conduct at Finisterre towards the end of December, and on 17 January 1806 took up the post of second in command at Portsmouth. He held the position until 9 November 1806, when he returned to sea, joining Collingwood's fleet blockading the remnants of the French and Spanish fleet at Cádiz, before moving to the Italian coast. He hoisted his flag aboard the 74-gun HMS Montagu in 1807, and continued in the Mediterranean. He was also aboard the 90-gun HMS Queen.

=== Mediterranean command ===
Martin oversaw the capture of the Italian islands of Ischia and Procida in June 1809, and in October he and his flagship HMS Canopus were dispatched with a small squadron to chase several French ships that had escaped from Toulon under Rear-Admiral François Baudin. Martin and his force discovered the French and chased them to the harbour of Cette at the mouth of the Rhone, where two ships, the 80-gun Robuste and the 74-gun Lion ran aground. Martin made plans to attack them, but their crews abandoned and burnt them on 26 October before he could carry them out. After a promotion to vice-admiral on 31 July 1810 Martin took command of the naval forces at Palermo, which had been tasked with supporting Sir John Stuart's forces in Calabria. The King of Naples, Ferdinand I appointed Martin to the Order of Saint Januarius on 6 July 1811 for his good service during these duties.

=== Last years at sea ===
Martin returned to England and went ashore on striking his flag on 14 October 1810. He returned to sea in 1812, flying his flag aboard the 78-gun HMS Impetueux and took command of the forces off Lisbon. He remained in this role for the next two years, shifting his flag to HMS Stately and then HMS Rodney in 1813. He struck his flag on 24 June 1814 and the following day was nominated a Knight Bachelor on the occasion of the Prince Regent's visiting the fleet at Spithead. On 2 January 1815 he received a further honour, when he was appointed a Knight Commander of the Order of the Bath, and on 20 February 1821 he was further advanced to a Knight Grand Cross of the Order of the Bath.

== Postwar ==
Martin continued to serve in the navy after the end of the Napoleonic Wars. Advanced to full admiral on 19 July 1821, he was appointed Commander-in-Chief, Portsmouth on 27 March 1824, with his flag aboard the 100-gun HMS Victory. He stepped down from the position on 30 April 1827, and on 23 January 1833 was appointed Rear-Admiral of the United Kingdom. He became Vice-Admiral of the United Kingdom in April 1834, a post he held until November 1846. He was appointed a Knight Grand Cross of the Order of St Michael and St George on 17 May 1837 in recognition for his services against the French at Malta, and was promoted to Admiral of the Fleet on 9 November 1846. He briefly became Vice-Admiral of the United Kingdom again on 10 July 1847 until his death later that month. Martin also served for some time as the vice-president of the Naval Charitable Society.

== Personal life, and death ==
Martin married twice, the first time on 3 April 1804 to Harriet Bentinck, the sister of Vice-Admiral William Bentinck. Harriet died on 15 October 1806, and Martin remarried, uniting with Ann Locke on 2 June 1815. Ann died on 1 March 1842, neither marriages having produced any children. Admiral of the Fleet Sir George Martin died on 28 July 1847 in Berkeley Square, Westminster at the age of 83. His sword is currently held in the collections of the National Maritime Museum.

== See also ==
- O'Byrne, William Richard (1849). "Martin, George" . A Naval Biographical Dictionary . John Murray – via Wikisource.

Military offices
Preceded by Sir James Hawkins-Whitshed	Commander-in-Chief, Portsmouth; 1824–1827	Succeeded by Sir Robert Stopford
Honorary titles
Preceded by Sir Thomas Foley	Rear-Admiral of the United Kingdom; 1833–1834	Succeeded by Sir Robert Stopford
Preceded by Sir Edward Thornbrough	Vice-Admiral of the United Kingdom; 1834–1846	Succeeded by Sir Davidge Gould
Preceded by Sir Robert Stopford	Vice-Admiral of the United Kingdom; 1847	Succeeded by Sir Thomas Byam Martin
