= Action of 7 April 1800 =

- Part of the French Revolutionary Wars
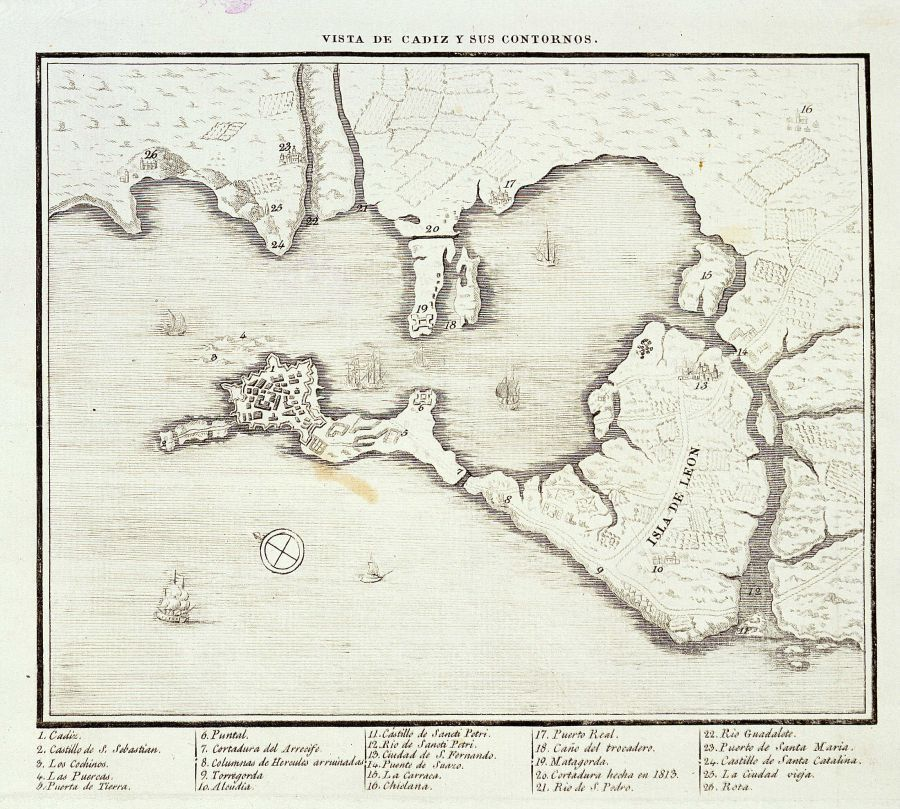
- Map of Cádiz Bay
Date	5–7 April 1800
Location	Bay of Cádiz, Spain
Result	British victory

Belligerents
Great Britain	Spain

Commanders and leaders
John Thomas Duckworth	Don Fraquin Porcel; Don Manuel Norates

Strength
Ships of the line HMS Leviathan and HMS Swiftsure frigate HMS Emerald	frigates Nuestra Señora del Carmén, Santa Florentina, Santa Sabina, 13 merchant ships

Casualties and losses
None	2 frigates, 9 merchant ships captured, 23 killed, 28 wounded

The action of 7 April 1800 was a minor naval engagement fought between a British squadron blockading the Spanish naval base of Cádiz and a convoy of 13 Spanish merchant vessels escorted by three frigates, bound for the Spanish colonies in the Americas. The blockade squadron consisted of the ships of the line HMS Leviathan and HMS Swiftsure and the frigate HMS Emerald, commanded by Rear-Admiral John Thomas Duckworth on Leviathan. The Spanish convoy sailed from Cádiz on 3 April 1800 and encountered Duckworth's squadron two days later. The Spanish attempted to escape; Emerald succeeded in capturing one ship early on 6 April. The British captured a brig the following morning and the British squadron divided in pursuit of the remainder.

Calm winds delayed both pursuer and quarry and it was not until the morning of 7 April that Leviathan and Emerald came up on the bulk of the Spanish convoy, which was still under escort from the Spanish frigate squadron. Swiftsure had been detached south in pursuit of the rest of the convoy. Two Spanish frigates, Nuestra Señora del Carmén and Santa Florentina mistook Duckworth's force for part of their convoy, came too close, and had to surrender after short but fierce resistance. The third Spanish frigate, Spanish frigate Santa Sabina managed to escape Emerald's pursuit but the rest of the convoy was left unprotected and the British seized four more ships. In all, the British captured and sent into Gibraltar 13 vessels of the 16-ship convoy.

== Background ==
By April 1800, the Kingdom of Great Britain and the Kingdom of Spain had been at war for three and a half years, following the Treaty of San Ildefonso that turned Spain from an enemy of the French Republic during the French Revolutionary Wars to an ally. The principal Spanish fleet was based in the large Southern Spanish port of Cádiz and had become an immediate target for the Royal Navy, which stationed a blockade fleet off the port to restrict Spanish movements and trade. This fleet, initially commanded by Vice-Admiral Sir John Jervis, won a significant victory over the Spanish at the Battle of Cape St. Vincent in February 1797.

The port of Cádiz was the principal maritime conduit for Spanish trade and communication, particularly regarding the extensive Spanish colonies in the Americas. Convoys carrying supplies and trade goods back and forth continued to use Cádiz and by 1800 in an effort to stop these the British Mediterranean Fleet was deploying smaller squadrons of frigates and ships of the line. In March 1800, command of the blockade was entrusted to Rear-Admiral John Thomas Duckworth sailing in the 74-gun ship of the line HMS Leviathan with Captain James Carpenter. Accompanying Leviathan was the 74-gun HMS Swiftsure under Captain Benjamin Hallowell and the 36-gun frigate HMS Emerald under Captain Thomas Moutray Waller. This force, accompanied by the small fireship HMS Incendiary had captured two merchant ships sailing from Cádiz in late March, the Spanish Parifama Concepieona bound for Tenerife on 20 March and the French Le Puy du Dome for Cayenne on 23 March. These prizes were sent to the fleet bases at Lisbon and Gibraltar, the latter accompanied by Incendiary.

During March the Spanish authorities in Cádiz prepared a convoy to sail to their American colonies consisting of 13 merchant vessels bound for Lima in the Viceroyalty of Peru, Buenos Aires and Montevideo in the Viceroyalty of the River Plate and Veracruz in the Viceroyalty of New Spain. Accompanying this convoy were three 34-gun frigates, Nuestra Señora del Carmén under Captain Don Fraquin Porcel, Santa Florentina under Captain Don Manuel Norates, and Santa Sabina. All three frigates had undergone extensive preparations for the voyage, with new copper sheathing on their hulls and full crews and stores for the long journey. They were also each carrying 500 quintals of quicksilver for use in the Peruvian silver mining industry.

== Battle ==
The Spanish convoy sailed on 3 April, and by the afternoon of 5 April was crossing the Bay of Cádiz when it was sighted by lookouts on Leviathan. The British force immediately gave chase, the Spanish scattering in an effort to escape. Calm weather delayed both forces, but by 03:00 on 6 April Waller could bring Emerald across the path of the small Spanish merchant ship Confiance, bound for Buenos Aires with trade goods. Confiance surrendered immediately and was taken to Gibraltar by a prize crew as the British force pressed on. The following morning calm winds prevented any movement at all, with allowed boats from Leviathan and Emerald to be launched against a Spanish merchant brig lying becalmed nearby. For 40 minutes the boats, commanded by Lieutenant Charles March Gregory, exchanged fire with the brig Los Angeles (apparently also known as Barcelona), before the Spanish vessel surrendered.

On the morning of 6 April no Spanish ships were in sight other than Los Angeles, but as the wind gradually increased sails were sighted to the east, west and south. Duckworth ordered his force to separate, Hallowell pursuing to the south while Leviathan went west and Emerald east. At 12:00 however Waller signalled that six sails were visible to the northeast and Duckworth reversed his decision, joining Emerald in pursuit of the main body of the Spanish convoy. By the time darkness fell, nine Spanish sail were visible to Leviathan's lookouts. During the day the British convoy had succeeded in overrunning two more Spanish ships, La Bastanesa and Nuestra Senora de las Delares, both carrying supplies to Buenos Aires.

Duckworth planned to sail north using a northwesterly breeze that should allow him to cut across the head of the Spanish convoy. At 12:00 on 7 April three sails were sighted and at 02:00 two were identified as Spanish frigates. Duckworth ordered his ships to follow parallel courses towards the Spaniards with the intention of bringing them to action at dawn. The Spanish captains had misidentified the new arrivals, believing them to be part of the scattered convoy, and it was not until dawn that they realised their mistake, by which time Duckworth's force was too close for them to escape. Duckworth hailed the nearest frigate, demanding its surrender in the face of overwhelming force, but the Spanish captain refused, raising all sail in an effort to escape. The second Spanish ship did likewise despite a volley of musket fire from the Royal Marines on Leviathan, and Duckworth instead attempted to smash the Spanish frigates' rigging with a broadside fired over their decks. This effort failed, but a second attack by Emerald was more successful despite ineffective counterfire from the Spanish ships. With their rigging damaged and escape impossible, and the frigates, Nuestra Señora del Carmén and Santa Florentina, surrendered rather than face another broadside from Leviathan.

== Aftermath ==
Duckworth remained with his prizes, effecting repairs and transferring prisoners, for the next two hours. Among the passengers on Nuestra Señora del Carmén was Pedro Inocencio Bejarano, Bishop of Buenos Aires. Duckworth directed Waller to pursue the third frigate, now visible, but Emerald's copper-bottom was in a poor condition however and Santa Sabina easily outpaced Waller's ship, which soon broke off pursuit and concentrated on the scattering merchant shipping. During the rest of the day, Emerald could chase down and capture four large merchant ships. Once the frigates were secure, Leviathan joined the chase but the distance was too great and the remainder escaped after dark. When combined with another capture by Swiftsure this meant that Duckworth's force had captured nine of the 13 merchant ships and two of three frigates from the convoy. The new captures, Jesus Nazareen, El Veneato, Providence, Cartagena and Madre de Dios were all laden with trade goods for the colonies and were taken to Gibraltar for assessment and sale.

The Spanish frigates had suffered a number of casualties in what historian William James called their "honourable resistance". Nuestra Señora del Carmén had lost 11 men killed and 16 wounded while Santa Florentina lost 11 killed and 12 wounded, the latter including Captain Norates. Both captured warships were sent back to Britain and purchased for service in the Royal Navy under the names HMS Carmen and HMS Florentina. None of the British ships reported any casualties. Shortly after this action, Duckworth was transferred to command of the Leeward Islands station, his place taken by Rear-Admiral Sir Richard Bickerton.
