= HMS Irresistible =

Four ships of the Royal Navy have been named HMS Irresistible. A fifth was planned but later renamed:

- HMS Irresistible (1782) was a 74-gun third-rate ship of the line launched in 1782 and broken up in 1806.
- HMS Irresistible was a prison ship, launched as HMS Swiftsure in 1787. She was captured by the French in 1801, and recaptured in the Battle of Trafalgar in 1805. She was renamed HMS Irresistible in 1806 and was broken up in 1816.
- HMS Irresistible (1859) was an 80-gun screw propelled second rate launched in 1859. She was used for harbour service from 1869 and was sold in 1894.
- HMS Irresistible (1898) was a Formidable-class battleship launched in 1898 and sunk by a mine in 1915 in Gallipoli, Turkey.
- HMS Irresistible was to have been an Audacious-class aircraft carrier. She was renamed HMS Ark Royal before being launched in 1950.
