= HMS Emerald (1795) =

Frigate of the Royal Navy, in service 1795-1836

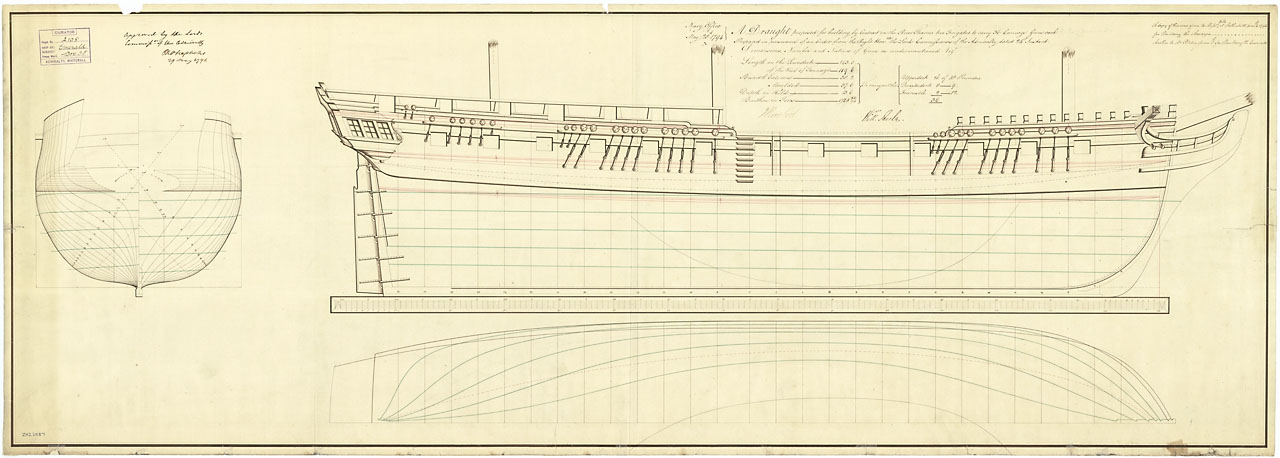
- Original profile plan of Emerald and her sister ship, Amazon, built to the same lines and dimensions.

History

Great Britain
- Name: HMS Emerald
- Ordered: 24 May 1794
- Builder: Thomas Pitcher
- Cost: £14,419
- Laid down: June 1794
- Launched: 31 July 1795
- Commissioned: August 1795
- Fate: Broken up, January 1836

General characteristics
- Class & type: Amazon-class frigate
- Tons burthen: 933 67/94 (bm)
- Length: 143 ft 2 1/2 in (43.6 m) (gundeck); 119 ft 5 1/2 in (36.4 m) (keel)
- Beam: 38 ft 4 in (11.7 m)
- Depth of hold: 13 ft 6 in (4.1 m)
- Propulsion: Sails
- Complement: 264
- Armament: Gundeck: 26 × 18-pounder guns; QD: 8 × 9-pounder guns + 6 × 32-pounder carronades; Fc: 2 × 9-pounder guns + 2 × 32-pounder carronades

HMS Emerald was a 36-gun Amazon-class fifth rate frigate that Sir William Rule designed in 1794 for the Royal Navy. The Admiralty ordered her construction towards the end of May 1794 and work began the following month at Northfleet dockyard. She was completed on 12 October 1795 and joined Admiral John Jervis's fleet in the Mediterranean.

In 1797, Emerald was one of several vessels sent to hunt down and capture the crippled Santisima Trinidad, which had escaped from the British at the Battle of Cape St Vincent. Emerald was supposed to have been present at the Battle of the Nile but in May 1798 a storm separated her from Horatio Nelson's squadron and she arrived in Aboukir Bay nine days too late. She was part of Rear-Admiral John Thomas Duckworth's squadron during the action of 7 April 1800 off Cádiz.

Emerald served in the Caribbean throughout 1803 in Samuel Hood's fleet, then took part in the invasion of St Lucia in July, and of Surinam the following spring. Returning to home waters for repairs in 1806, she served in the Western Approaches before joining a fleet under Admiral James Gambier in 1809, and taking part in the Battle of the Basque Roads. In November 1811 she sailed to Portsmouth where she was laid up in ordinary. Fitted out as a receiving ship in 1822, she was eventually broken up in January 1836.

== Construction and armament ==
Emerald was a 36-gun, 18-pounder, Amazon-class frigate built to Sir William Rule's design. (Note: The original Amazon-class frigates were 32-gun, 12-pounder, frigates of 677 tons (bm), designed by Sir John Williams and built between 1771 and 1782. In need of a larger frigate, in 1794, the Admiralty asked Rule to design a 36-gun, 18-pounder, Amazon-class frigate. Originally a series of four, by the time the first one had been launched in 1795, Rule had already drawn up plans for Naiad, an expanded version which was larger at 1,013 tons (bm), had a complement of 284 men and carried 38 guns. A third design was unveiled in 1796, also with 38 guns but larger still at 1,038 tons (bm) and with a crew of 300 men. Two were ordered, one in April 1796 and a second in February 1797.) She and her sister ship, Amazon, were ordered on 24 May 1794 and were built to the same dimensions: 143 feet 2 1/2 inches (43.6 m) along the gun deck, 119 feet 5 1/2 inches (36.4 m) at the keel, with a beam of 38 feet 4 inches (11.7 m) and a depth in the hold of 13 feet 6 inches (4.1 m). They measured 933 67/94 tons burthen.

Completed at Thomas Pitcher's dockyard in Northfleet at a cost of £14,419, Emerald was launched on 31 July 1795, twenty-seven days after Amazon. Her coppering at Woolwich was finished on 12 October 1795, and she was fitted-out at a further cost of £9,390.

Emerald was built to carry a main battery of twenty-six 18-pounder (8.2-kilogram) long guns on her gun deck, eight 9 pdr (4.1 kg) on the quarterdeck and two on the forecastle. She additionally carried eight 32 pdr (15 kg) carronades, six on the quarterdeck and two on the forecastle. (Note: The gun-rating of a vessel was the number of long guns it was designed to carry and did not always match its actual armament. Before 1817, carronades were not counted at all unless they were direct replacements for long guns. Carronades were lighter so could be manoeuvred with fewer men, and had a faster rate of fire but had a much shorter range than the long gun.) When fully manned, Amazon-class frigates had a complement of 264.

The Admiralty ordered a second pair of Amazon-class ships on 24 January 1795. They were marginally smaller at 92587/94 tons (bm) and were built from pitch pine. (Note: The second pair of Amazons were named Trent and Glenmore and were launched in 1796 on 24 February and 24 March, respectively.)

== Service ==
=== Mediterranean ===
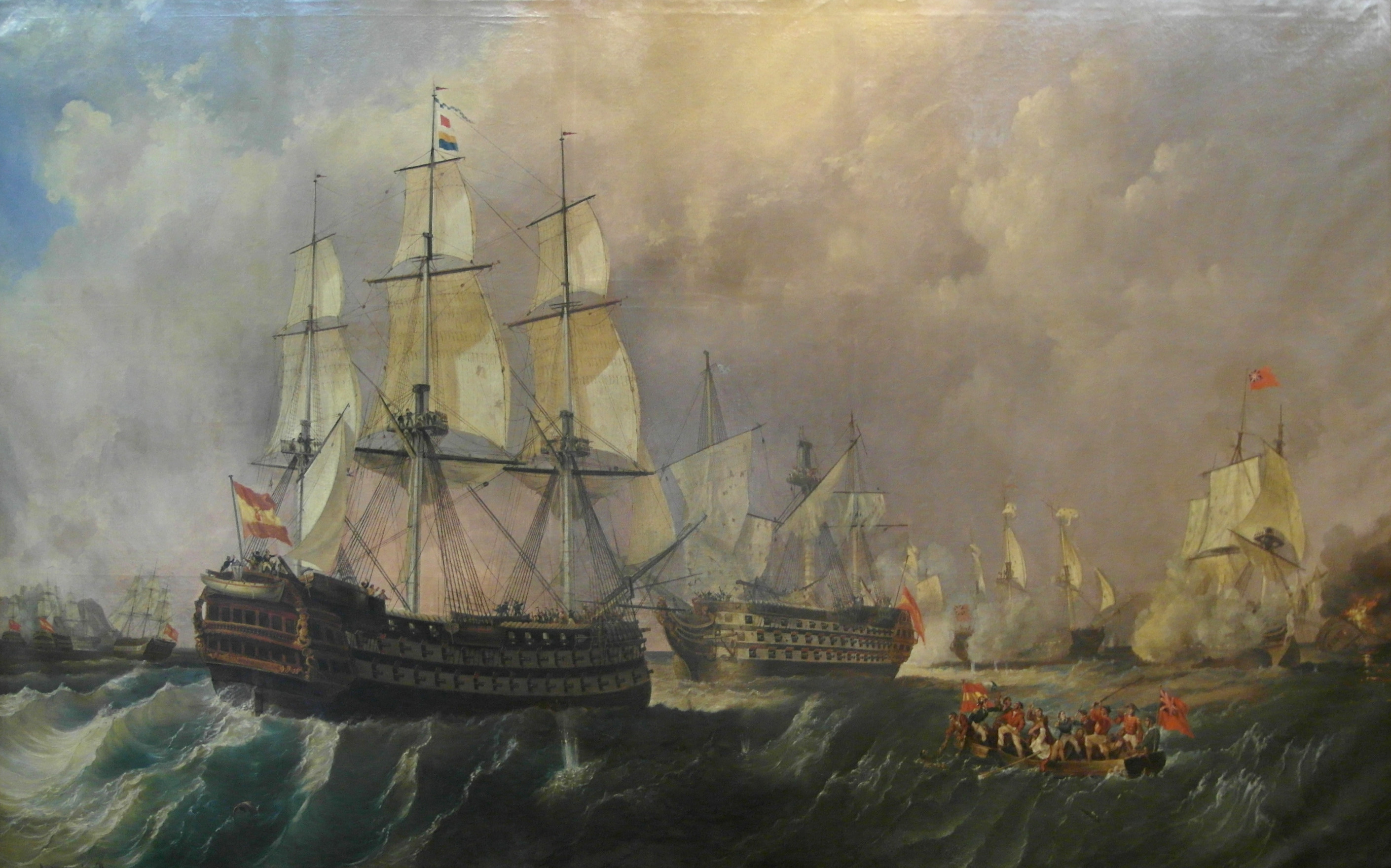
Santisima Trinidad being rescued at the Battle of Cape St Vincent. Emerald was one of the British frigates sent out to track her down afterwards.

Emerald was first commissioned in August 1795, under Captain Velters Cornewall Berkeley and following her fitting out, joined the Western Squadron at Portsmouth. While on a cruise in February 1796, she lost her mainmast in a storm off Ushant but was able to limp home for repairs. In April, she took a convoy to the River Tagus and continued to perform escort duties for some months after, before sailing to the Mediterranean in January 1797 and joining Admiral John Jervis's fleet at Gibraltar.

==== Battle of Cape St Vincent ====
Spain had become allied to France and declared war on Britain in October 1796. Early in 1797, a Spanish fleet of 27 ships of the line was at Cartagena with orders to join the French fleet at Brest. A storm blew the Spanish fleet off course, enabling Jervis's fleet of 15 ships of the line to intercept it off Cape St Vincent on 14 February. Although attached to the British fleet at the time, Emerald was not present at the battle; kept away by contrary wind. After making several attempts to join the action, she retired to nearby Lagos Bay with other vessels. Consequently, the crew was denied a share of the prize money. (Note: This decision upset the boatswain, Patrick Toben, so much that he suggested the crew should mutiny. He was reported for his remarks and later court-martialled. Found guilty, he was hanged from Emerald's yardarm on 19 August.)

On 16 February, the victorious British fleet and its prizes entered the bay. Jervis ordered the three frigates—Emerald, Minerve and Niger, of 40 and 32 guns, respectively—to search for the disabled flagship, Santisima Trinidad, which had been towed from the battle. Two smaller craft—Bonne-Citoyenne, a corvette of 20 guns, and the 14-gun sloop Raven—joined the frigates. The British squadron on 20 February sighted Santisima Trinidad under tow by a large frigate and in the company of a brig. Berkeley, considering the small squadron under his command insufficient, declined to engage and eventually the Spanish ships sailed from sight. (Note: Berkeley's reluctance to attack infuriated some of his fellow officers who asked for a court-martial. Minerve's captain, George Cockburn, however came down on Berkeley's side, opining to Jervis that, under a jury rig, Santisima Trinidad was still capable of making a defence. The 32-gun HMS Terpsichore, while cruising alone, later located Santisima Trinidad and engaged her but the out-gunned British frigate had to abandon her attack.)

==== Action of 26 April 1797 ====
Following the Battle of Cape St Vincent, the British pursued the remainder of the Spanish fleet to Cádiz, where Jervis began a long-running blockade of the port. On 26 April, while cruising in the company of the 74-gun Irresistible, Emerald helped to capture a 34-gun Spanish ship and to destroy another. The Spanish vessels were close to the coast when Jervis's fleet sighted them. Sent to investigate, Emerald and Irresistible, under Captain George Martin, discovered the ships were the frigates Santa Elena and Ninfa—the Spanish ships had been carrying silver from Havana to Cádiz, but had transferred their cargo the previous night to a fishing boat that had warned them of the proximity of the British fleet.

The Spanish ships sought shelter from the British north of Trafalgar in Conil Bay, the entrance to which was protected by a large rocky ledge. Irresistible and Emerald negotiated this obstacle at around 14:30 and engaged the Spanish ships, which were anchored in the Bay. The Spanish ships surrendered at approximately 16:00. Eighteen Spaniards were killed and 30 wounded during the fighting; one Briton was killed and one wounded. The remaining crew of Santa Elena avoided capture by cutting her cables and drifting her on shore so they could flee on foot. The British managed to drag Santa Elena off the beach but, badly damaged, she sank at sea.

The British took Ninfa into service as HMS Hamadryad, a 36-gun frigate with a main battery of 12-pounders, but were unable to retrieve the cargo of silver, which later arrived safely in Cádiz.

==== Second bombardment of Cádiz ====
Captain Thomas Waller took command of Emerald in mid-1797, and was stationed with Admiral Jervis's fleet off Cádiz. On 3 July, Jervis attempted to end the protracted blockade by ordering a bombardment of the town. A first attempt resulted in the capture of two Spanish mortar boats but achieved little else. During a second bombardment on the night of 5 July, Emerald, in the company of Terpsichore and the 74-gun Theseus, provided a protective escort for three bomb vessels, Thunder, Terror and Strombolo. This attack caused considerable damage; the next morning, the Spanish hurriedly moved ten of their line-of-battle ships out of range. The British cancelled a third bombardment, planned for 8 July, when the weather became unfavourable.

==== Attack on Santa Cruz ====
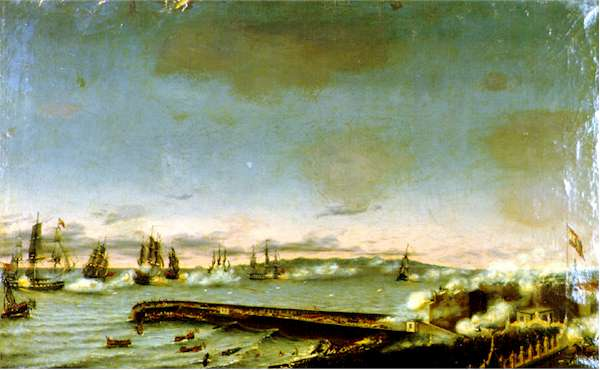
The British attack on Santa Cruz de Tenerife, painted in 1848 by Francisco de Aguilar

Later in July 1797, Emerald took part in an unsuccessful attack on Santa Cruz. A planned attack in April, proposed by Admiral Nelson, had been aborted as the troops required to execute it were unavailable. When Jervis was subsequently advised that the Spanish treasure fleet was anchored there, he revived Nelson's idea.

For the new attack, Nelson was to take three ships of the line, three frigates, including Emerald, and 200 marines, for an amphibious landing outside the Spanish stronghold. The frigates would then engage the batteries to the north-east of Santa Cruz while the marines stormed the town. However, a combination of strong currents and heavy Spanish fire forced the British to abandon the attack. Several further attempts were made between 22 and 25 July; although the British were able to land troops, Spanish resistance was too strong and the British had to ask for an honourable withdrawal. About 90 of Emerald's crew, including Waller, fought their way into the town alongside Thomas Troubridge; 17 died in the assault. Another 10 died before the landing; drowned when the hired-armed vessel, Fox, was sunk by a 24 lb (11 kg) cannonball.

After the attack, Nelson sent Emerald with his report to Jervis, who in turn sent her on to England with dispatches. Waller arrived at the Admiralty on 1 September, with the news of the failed attacks.

==== Alexandria ====
While serving with Jervis on the Lisbon station in December 1797, Emerald, under the temporary command of Lord William Proby, captured the 8-gun privateer, Chasseur Basque. Waller returned as captain in April 1798. In May, Jervis dispatched a squadron of five ships, including Emerald and commanded by Nelson in the 74-gun Vanguard, to locate a large invasion fleet that had left Toulon. (Note: In addition to Emerald and Vanguard, the squadron comprised Terpsichore, Bonne-Citoyenne and the 74-gun Orion. It left Gibraltar on 9 May 1798.) After receiving intelligence on 22 May, Nelson correctly predicted the French fleet's destination and set course for Alexandria where the British captured or destroyed all but two of the French ships at the Battle of the Nile, which occurred between 1–3 August 1798. Emerald missed the battle; having previously become separated from the rest of the squadron in a storm on 21 May, she arrived at Aboukir Bay on 12 August.

When Nelson left for Naples on 19 August 1798, he left behind a squadron—comprising three 74s Zealous, Goliath, Swiftsure, three frigates Emerald, Seahorse and Alcmene, and the corvette Bonne Citoyenne—under Samuel Hood to patrol the waters around the port and along the coast. On 2 September, it encountered and destroyed the French aviso Anémone. (Note: Anemone was the tartane Cincinnatus, which the French Navy had commissioned in June 1794 as an aviso, and renamed in May 1795. Her armament consisted of two 6-pounder and two 4-pounder guns, and four swivel guns. She had left Toulon on 27 July and Malta on 26 August.)

Emerald and Seahorse chased Anemone inshore, where she anchored in shallow water out of their reach. When they launched their boats to cut-out Anėmone, her crew cut the anchor cable and their ship drifted on to the shore; as the Frenchmen were attempting to escape along the coast, hostile Arabs captured them and stripped them of their clothes, shooting those who resisted. A heavy surf prevented the British boats from landing, so a midshipman from Emerald, the young Francis Fane, swam ashore with a line and empty cask to rescue the commander and seven others who had escaped naked to the beach. (Note: The Arabs captured some 17 to 20 survivors (accounts differ), and offered them to General Kleber, who ransomed them.) Anėmone had a crew of 60 men under the command of Enseigne de Vaisseau (Ensign) Garibou, and was also carrying General Camin and Citoyen Valette, aide-de-camp to General Napoleon Bonaparte, with dispatches from Toulon. Camin and Valette were among those the Arabs killed. (Note: Adjutant General Jean-Baptiste Camin (1760–1798), came from Calais. After his death, the French erected a small fort on the outskirts of Cairo and named it in his honour.) Emerald remained stationed off Alexandria for the rest of the year.

==== Action on 18 June 1799 ====
Emerald and Minerve, while cruising together on 2 June, took Caroline, a 16-gun French privateer, off the south-east coast of Sardinia. Later, Emerald assisted in the capture of Junon, Alceste, Courageuse, Salamine and Alerte in the action of 18 June 1799. The British fleet under George Elphinstone was some 69 miles off Cape Sicié when three French frigates and two brigs were spotted. Elphinstone engaged them with three seventy-fours, Centaur, Bellona and Captain, and two frigates, Emerald and Santa Teresa. The next evening, after a 28-hour chase, the French ships were forced into an action. The French squadron had scattered, enabling the British to attack it piecemeal. Bellona fired the first shots at 19:00 as she, Captain, and the two frigates closed with Junon and Alceste, both of which struck their colours immediately. Bellona then joined Centaur in chasing Courageuse. Faced with overwhelming odds, Courageuse also surrendered. Emerald then overhauled Salamine, and Captain took Alerte at around 23:30.

==== Action on 7 April 1800 ====
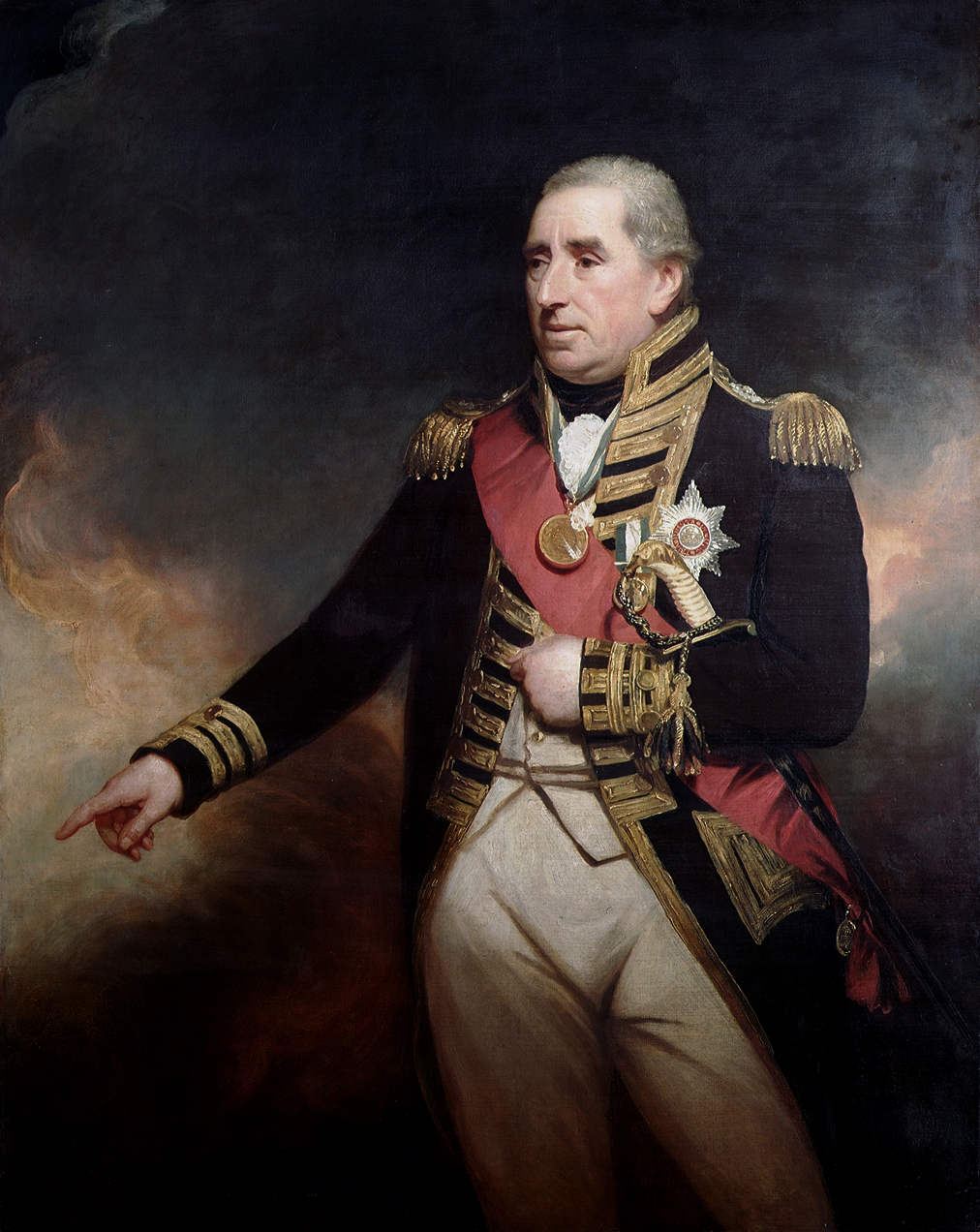
Rear-Admiral John Duckworth, commander of the squadron blockading Cádiz, of which Emerald was a part when she fought in the action of 7 April 1800

Emerald returned to blockade duty at Cádiz in April 1800, joining a squadron under Rear-Admiral John Thomas Duckworth that included the 74-gun ships Leviathan and Swiftsure, and the fire ship Incendiary. The squadron sighted a Spanish convoy on 5 April, which comprised 13 merchant vessels and three accompanying frigates, and at once gave chase. At 03:00 the following day, Emerald managed to overhaul and cross the bow of a 10-gun merchantman, which, having nowhere to go, immediately surrendered. By daybreak, the remainder of the Spanish convoy had scattered and the only ship visible was a 14-gun brig, Los Anglese. The absence of wind prevented the becalmed British vessels approaching her. Instead, Leviathan and Emerald lowered boats that rowed towards the brig, which they captured after a short exchange of fire.

Other sails were now spotted in the east, west and south, forcing the British to divide their force: Swiftsure went south, Emerald east, and Leviathan west. At midday, Emerald signalled that there were six vessels to the north-east, and Leviathan wore round to pursue. By dusk, the two British ships had nine Spanish craft in sight. Three ships were seen at midnight to the north-north-west, and by 02:00 the following morning, two had been identified as the enemy frigates Nuestra Señora del Carmén and Santa Florentina. Duckworth ordered Emerald to take a parallel course to the enemy frigates in anticipation of a dawn attack, and at first light, the British closed with their opponents.

The Spaniards had assumed the approaching vessels were part of their convoy, but by daybreak they had realised their error and vainly set more sail to escape. Being close enough to hail the Spanish crews, Duckworth ordered them to surrender. When the Spaniards ignored the demand, he ordered Leviathan and Emerald to open fire on the rigging of the Spanish vessels in order to disable them. Both Spanish frigates quickly surrendered. Nuestra Señora del Carmén had had 11 men killed and 16 wounded; Santa Florentina 12 killed and 10 wounded, including her first and second captains. The two Spanish frigates were each carrying 1,500 quintals of mercury.

A third frigate was visible on the horizon. Emerald immediately set off in pursuit but Duckworth recalled her and instead ordered her to locate the merchant ships; she secured four of the largest vessels by nightfall. The need to make the two captured frigates ready to sail delayed Leviathan, and by the time this was completed the third frigate had made her escape. Leviathan then returned to rendezvous with Emerald, managing to take a further enemy brig before night fell. The following day, both British vessels sailed for Gibraltar with their prizes. On arrival, they encountered Incendiary, which had made port the previous day with two captured vessels of its own. The small British squadron managed to secure nine merchant vessels and two frigates in total. In October 1800, Emerald returned to Portsmouth for repairs.

=== Caribbean ===
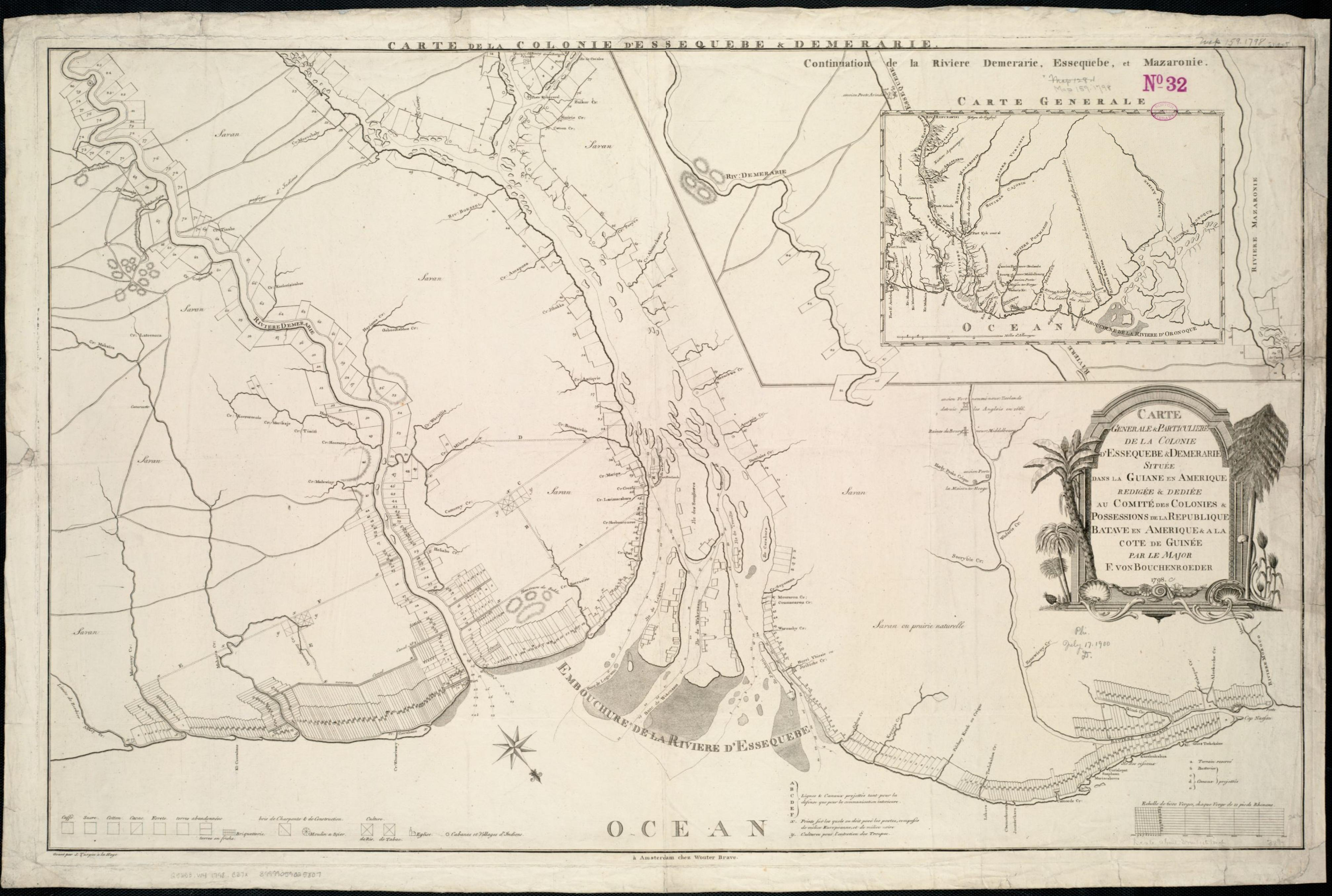
1798 map showing the Dutch colonies of Essequibo and Demarara

Emerald was recommissioned in December 1800 under Captain James O'Bryen and early in 1801, escorted a convoy of 110 ships to the West Indies Station, where she continued in service during the short-lived Peace of Amiens.

The ship struck a submerged reef in August. Emerald, flying a distress signal and firing her guns to attract attention was noticed by HMS Magnanime who sailed to her aid. In the meantime, in an attempt to lighten the load and float her off, O'Bryen had the ballast jettisoned and the cannons loaded into one of the ship's boats. Holed below the water line and taking on water at the rate of 1 3/4 inches (44.5 mm) per hour, Emerald was able to make it into English Harbour for repairs. The work took 3 months to complete. O'Bryen was court-martialled over the affair in January 1802 and found not guilty of negligence.

In April 1802, Emerald transported Lord Lavington, the governor general from Antigua to Bermuda. (Note: Also on board was Lavington's aide-de-camp and six servants, along with the Speaker for the Assembly of Antigua, the Treasurer and the Chief Justice.) The following month, she intercepted a schooner carrying refugees from Guadeloupe, who were taken on board and delivered to Antigua. War broke out again in May 1803, by which time Emerald had joined Samuel Hood's squadron in Barbados for an attack on St Lucia. Prior to the invasion on 21 June, she harassed enemy shipping, disrupting supplies to the island.

The invasion force left on 20 June. It comprised Hood's 74-gun flagship Centaur, the 74-gun Courageux, the frigates Argo and Chichester, (Note: Chichester was a large two-decker that had been converted for use as a troopship. She was lightly-armed with twenty-two 12-pound guns.) and the sloops Hornet and Cyane. The following morning, Emerald and the 18-gun sloop Osprey had joined them. By 11:00, the squadron was anchored in Choc Bay. The troops were landed by 17:00 and half an hour later the town of Castries was in British hands. In the island's main fortress, Morne-Fortunée, the French troops refused to surrender; the British stormed it at 04:00 on 22 June, and by 04:30 St Lucia was in British hands. Following this easy victory, the British sent a force to Tobago, which capitulated on 1 July.

Emerald was between St Lucia and Martinique on 24 June, when she captured the 16-gun French privateer Enfant Prodigue after a 72-hour chase. The French vessel was under the command of lieutenant de vaisseau Victor Lefbru and was carrying dispatches for Martinique. The Royal Navy took Enfant Prodigue into service as HMS St Lucia.

While in the company of the 22-gun brig HMS Heureux, Emerald intercepted and captured a Dutch merchant vessel travelling between Surinam and Amsterdam on 10 August. On 5 September, she captured two French schooners, and later that month took part in attacks on Berbice, Essequibo and Demarara.

In November 1803, Emerald ran aground again, this time off the north-east corner of English Harbour. Nearly 300 slaves from the local plantations and the 64th Regiment of Foot, were sent on board to supplement the crew at the pumps. After 6 days of continual pumping, the ship was able to get off and return to harbour, where she remained for several months while the necessary repairs were carried out.

==== Fort Diamond ====
Emerald's first lieutenant, Thomas Forest, commanded the 6-gun cutter Fort Diamond on 13 March 1804 when, with 30 of Emerald's crew aboard, she captured a French privateer off Saint-Pierre, Martinique. Contrary winds prevented the privateer, Mosambique, from entering St Pierre and she had sought shelter beneath the batteries at Seron. Because Emerald was too far downwind, Captain O'Bryen used boats and crew from Emerald to create a diversion and draw fire from the battery while Fort Diamond approached from the opposite direction, rounded Pearl Rock (some two miles off the coast), and bore down on Mosambique. Forest put the cutter alongside, with such force that a chain securing the privateer to the shore snapped. The 60-man French crew abandoned their vessel and swam ashore. The Royal Navy took Mosambique into service.

==== Capture of Surinam ====
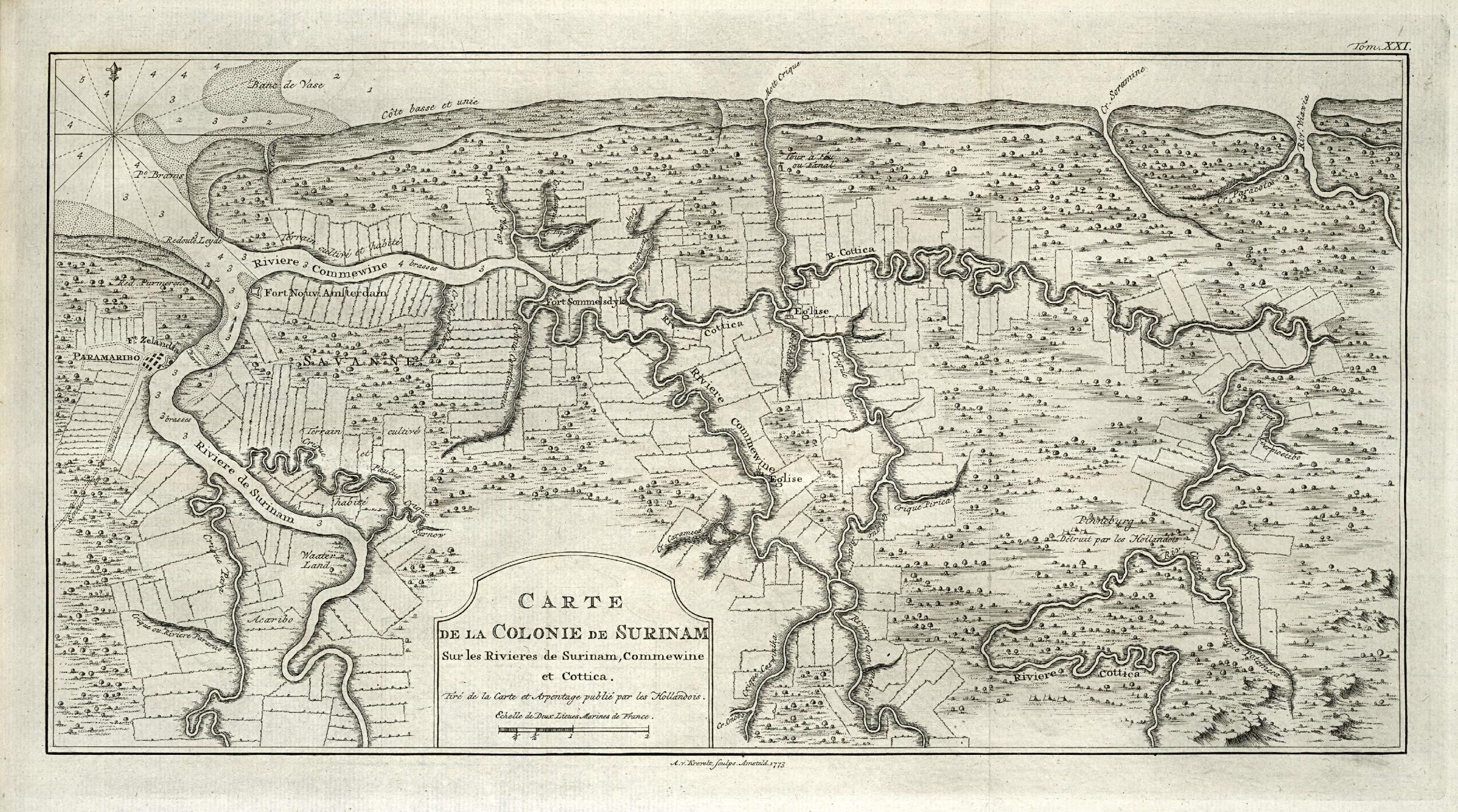
1773 map of the Dutch colony of Surinam showing the respective positions of the Surinam and Commewine rivers, Warapee Creek, Braam's point, and the forts Leyden and New Amsterdam

In the spring of 1804, Emerald and her crew took part in an invasion of Surinam. The invasion force consisted of Hood's flagship Centaur, Emerald, the 44-gun heavy frigates Pandour and Serapis, the 28-gun sixth-rate Alligator, the 12-gun schooner Unique, the 12-gun corvette Hippomenes, and the 8-gun Drake, together with 2,000 troops under Brigadier-General Sir Charles Green. The force arrived from Barbados on 25 April after a twenty-two-day journey. The sloop Hippomenes, a transport and a further three armed vessels, landed Brigadier-General Frederick Maitland and 700 troops at Warapee Creek on the night of 30 April. The following night, O'Bryen was ordered to assist Brigadier-General Hughes in the taking of Braam's Point. A sandbar initially prevented Emerald from entering the Surinam River but O'Bryen forced her across on the rising tide, with Pandour and Drake following. Anchoring close by, the three British ships quickly put the Dutch battery of 18-pounders out of action and captured the fort without loss of life.

Emerald, Pandour, and Drake then pushed up the river, sometimes in less water than the frigates required to float properly, until on 5 May they arrived close to the forts Leyden and Frederici. The British landed a detachment of troops under Hughes some distance away, which marching under the cover of the forests and swamps, launched an attack that resulted in the swift capture of the two forts. By this time, most of the squadron had managed to work its way up the river as far as Frederici, Maitland was advancing along the Commewine River, and with troops poised to attack the fort of New Amsterdam, the Batavian commandant, Lieutenant-Colonel Batenburg, duly surrendered.

Emerald captured the vessel Augusta, which was under American colours, on 22 August and sent her into Antigua with the cargo of wine that she had been carrying from Leghorn to Guadeloupe. Emerald left Tortola on 26 October as escort to a convoy of 50 vessels but a few days later on 29 October, she ran into trouble in a storm. At 06:00 the top section of the rudder snapped off and at 09:15 Emerald sent a signal of distress to the convoy when further damage forced the crew to cut the rudder away in its entirety. The signal was ignored but Emerald's carpenters were able to construct a replacement, row it into position and fit it. They reached the stopping off point, Madeira, in December and while moored in Funchal Bay, a merchant ship collided with Emerald, taking out the quarter gallery on the left-hand side and carrying away the cutter. A few days later, a similar accident resulted in the loss of her starboard quarter gallery. In order to finish the required repairs, O'Bryen had to put in to the Tagus and did not arrive home until 16 March 1805, when the ship paid off.

=== Service on the Home Station ===
Between February and June 1806, Emerald underwent a refurbishment at Deptford dockyard and was recommissioned under Captain John Armour on 6 June with Frederick Lewis Maitland assuming command on 28 November. Emerald spent much of her time under Maitland cruising in the Western Approaches and in the Bay of Biscay, off the Atlantic coast of France, where she preyed on enemy shipping. In January 1807, she was in the company of the 74-gun Renown and the 36-gun Santa Margarita, when two French vessels were seen off the Ile de Groix. One, a lugger, was driven on to the shore and the other, a ketch, captured. In April, Emerald's crew boarded a ship off Cape Finisterre. Formally the American vessel, Zulema, she had been captured by a French privateer ten days earlier while sailing from Philadelphia to Liverpool. She was sent into Plymouth, arriving under her master, Mr Howard, on 4 May.

While in the Basque Roads in April, Emerald captured the 14-gun privateer Austerlitz, a brig from Nantes under the command of Captain Gatien Lafont. Emerald, while escorting a Spanish polacca that she had taken, spotted and captured the privateer on 14 April after a ten-hour chase. Austerlitz had been out of port two days but had made no captures; the polacca was the Spanish ship Prince of Asturias, which had sailed from La Guayra with a cargo of cocoa, bark and indigo. Emerald sent both prizes into Plymouth, where they arrived on 22 April. Emerald herself set off in pursuit of another vessel from La Guayra. (Note: Prince of Asturias was sold as a prize with the buyer being "McCarthy". Subsequently, Lloyd's Register for 1806 gave her burthen as 239 tons, her master's name as R. Harvey, and her home port as London.)

During December, Plymouth received more of Emerald's captures. At the beginning of the month, Young Elias was detained. Her master, Monsieur Delance, had been sailing from Philadelphia to Bordeaux. On 26 December, Mr Seaton's vessel, Friendship was caught returning from France.

==== Apropos ====
Emerald's boats participated in a cutting-out expedition in Viveiro harbour on 13 March 1808. While cruising inshore at around 17:00, Emerald spotted a large French schooner, Apropos, (Note: Sometimes referred to as Apropus.) of 250 tons (bm), anchored in the bay. Apropos was armed with twelve 8-pounder guns, though pierced for 16, and had a crew of more than 70 men under the command of lieutenant de vaisseau Lagary.

The crews of the schooner and of the two batteries guarding the harbour had seen Emerald but Maitland still made plans to attack Apropos. He soon discovered it was not possible to place Emerald so as to engage both enemy batteries simultaneously, and instead sent landing parties to silence the guns, which had been firing on his ship since 17:30. The first landing party, led by Lieutenant Bertram and accompanied by two marine lieutenants and two master mates, stormed the outer fort. Maitland then positioned Emerald close to the second battery while a boat under the command of his third lieutenant, Smith, landed about a mile along the shore. This second landing party encountered Spanish soldiers, but drove them off and pursued them inland. By the time Smith's party returned to the beach, Emerald had already silenced the battery. In the darkness, Smith subsequently failed to locate the fort.

The crew of Apropos had run her ashore soon after Emerald had entered the harbour. The harbour batteries having been destroyed, Captain Maitland sent a further force under Midshipman Baird to secure and refloat the French ship. The original landing party under Lieutenant Bertram, which had already encountered and dispersed 60 members of the schooner's crew, met Baird's party on the beach. The British made several unsuccessful attempts to re-float the schooner before being forced to set her afire and depart. British casualties were heavy. Emerald had nine men killed, and 16 wounded, including Lieutenant Bertram. Maitland estimated that French casualties too had been heavy. In 1847 the Admiralty issued the clasp "Emerald 13 March 1808" to the Naval General Service Medal to the ten surviving claimants from the action.

Between May and August 1808, Emerald was employed as a supply ship, running provisions from Plymouth to the fleet blockading the French coast. A French schooner Amadea arrived in Plymouth on 15 December 1808 having previously been captured and sent in by Emerald.

==== Back in the Basque Roads ====
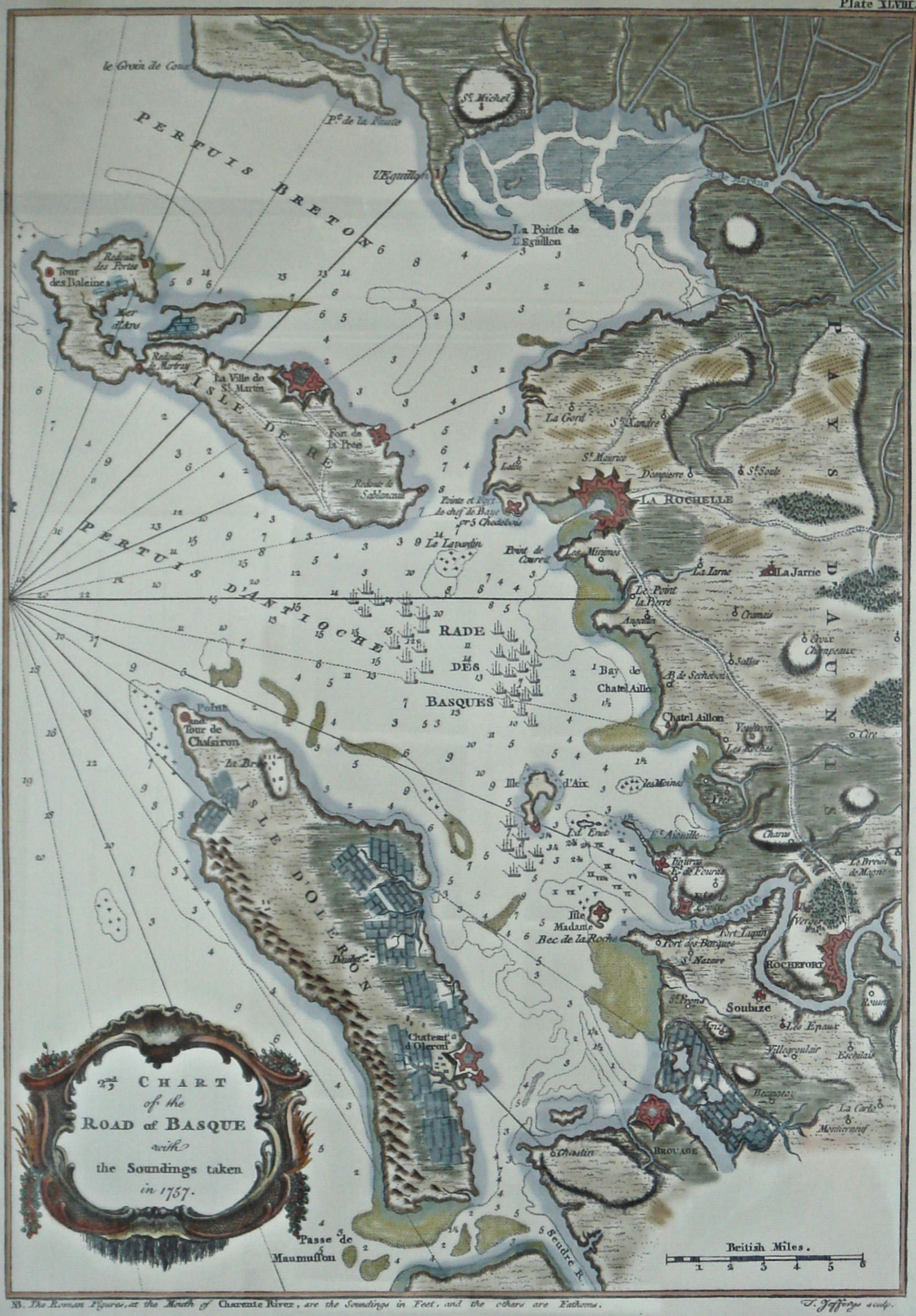
British chart of the Basque Roads, 1757

Back in the Basque Roads on 23 February 1809, Emerald was this time part of a squadron under Robert Stopford. Stopford's flagship, the 80-gun Caesar, was also accompanied by the seventy-fours Defiance and Donegal, and the 36-gun frigates Amethyst and Naiad. At 20:00, Stopford's squadron was anchored off the Chassiron Lighthouse, to the north-west of Ile d'Oléron, when the sighting of several rockets prompted him to investigate. About an hour later, sails were seen to the east which the British followed until daylight the following morning. The sails belonged to a French squadron that Stopford deduced to be out of Brest and which heaved to in the Pertuis d'Antioche.

The French force comprised eight ships of the line and two frigates, and Stopford immediately sent Naiad to apprise Admiral James Gambier of the situation. Naiad had not gone too far however when she signalled that there were three other vessels to the north-west. Stopford ordered Amethyst and Emerald to remain while he and the rest of the squadron set off in pursuit. The British frigate Amelia and the sloop Doterel also joined the chase. Caesar, Donegal, Defiance, and Amelia eventually drove the three French frigates ashore and destroyed them.

Emerald and Amethyst had more success in the spring of 1809 when on 23 March they captured the brigs Caroline and Serpent. In April, Emerald assisted Amethyst in the chase of a large 44-gun frigate off Ushant. Emerald sighted Niemen, with a main battery of 18-pounders and under the command of Captain Dupoter, at 11:00 on 5 April and immediately signalled Amethyst for assistance. Amethyst caught a glimpse of the French forty-four just as she turned away to the south-east and gave chase but by 19:20 had lost sight of both Niemen and Emerald. Amethyst fell in with Niemen again at around 21:30 and engaged her. Niemen was forced to strike when a second British frigate, Arethusa came into view and fired a broadside. The Royal Navy took Niemen into service under her existing name.

On 26 March, Enfant de Patria arrived at Plymouth. Patria, of 500 tons (bm), 10 guns, and 60 men, had sailed from France for Île de France when Emerald and Amethyst captured her. (Note: Marshall described Enfant de Patria as a letter of marque of 640 tons (bm), armed with eight guns, and carrying a crew of 60 men.) Two days later Emerald captured a second letter of marque, the 4-gun Aventurier, bound for the relief of Guadeloupe. She had a crew of 30 men.

==== Battle of the Basque Roads ====
Map illustrating the position of the anchored French fleet shortly before the British attack on the night of 11 April

Emerald was part of the fleet under Admiral Lord Gambier that fought the Battle of the Basque Roads in April 1809. The French ships were anchored under the protection of the powerful batteries on the Isle d'Aix when on 11 April Lord Cochrane attacked them with fireships and explosive vessels. Emerald provided a diversion to the east of the island with the brigs Beagle, Doterel, Conflict, and Growler. The fireships met with only partial success; the French, having anticipated such an attack, had rigged a boom across the channel. One of the explosive vessels breached the boom, leading the French to cut their cables and drift on to the shoals.

The following day, after much delay, Gambier ordered a battle squadron to reinforce Cochrane in the Basque Roads. The British ships anchored, with springs, in a crescent around some of the stranded French ships, and exchanged fire. (Note: A spring was a second rope attached to the anchor cable so that by pulling on it, the ship could be slewed round contrary to wind and tide, which would otherwise determine the angle of the vessel.) Emerald took up position ahead of Indefatigable and behind Aigle and Unicorn, and directed her fire mainly towards the French ships of the line, Varsovie and Aquilon, both of which struck at around 17:30.

At 20:00, Emerald, along with the other British frigates and brigs, weighed and anchored with the 74-gun HMS Revenge in the Maumusson passage to the south of Oléron while a second fireship attack was under preparation. Although the fireships were ready in the early hours on the 13th, contrary winds prevented their deployment. The British instead set Varsovie and Aquilon alight just after 03:00, on the orders of Captain John Bligh, after removing their crews. Emerald, and the other vessels moored with her, were recalled at 05:00 but owing to the lack of water, only the brigs were able to pass further up the river. Emerald therefore took no further part in the attack, which continued until 29 April when the last French ship was able to free herself from the mud and escape up the river to Rochefort.

=== Later service ===
Gambier received much disapproval for his inaction at Basque Roads and on 26 July 1809 was court-martialled. Maitland, who had been one of his critics, was by then serving with Emerald on the Irish station and did not attend the hearing. That same month, Emerald captured two French sloops. Deux Freres, en route for Guadeloupe from Rochelle when captured, arrived in Plymouth on 26 July. A week later, Emerald captured the French schooner Balance, which had been sailing to France from Guadeloupe. Both captures carried letters of marque. The first, of four guns, was carrying a small reinforcement for Guadeloupe's garrison. The second, also of four guns, was carrying a cargo of coffee and other colonial produce. (Note: Deux freres, a ketch of about 100 tons (bm), and Balance, a schooner of about 50 tons (bm), and their cargoes, were auctioned at Plymouth on 30 September 1809.)

While off the coast of Ireland on 8 October, Emerald rescued a British brig by capturing Incomparable, an 8-gun French privateer. The Frenchman was about to take the British vessel when Emerald intervened. Incomparable had a crew of 63 men and was four days out of Saint-Malo, but had not yet captured any other vessel. (Note: The report in Lloyd's List described Incomparable as being armed with 14 guns. French records show that she was commissioned in November 1807. She served under René Rosse until March 1808, Jean-Baptiste Dupuis from December, and from May 1809 made two cruises under Charles Tribalau. A third account gave her armament as eight 6-pounder guns and her crew as numbering 60 men.) Still in Irish waters on 6 November, Emerald took the 16-gun French brig Fanfaron, two days out of Brest and bound for Guadeloupe. After an all-night chase, Emerald caught up. Capitaine de fregate Croquet Deschateurs of Fanfaron resisted, firing several broadsides and a final double-shotted broadside. Unable to escape, Deschateurs prepared to board but Emerald evaded the manoeuvre and fired a broadside that dismasted Fanfaron, leaving Deschateurs no option but to surrender his vessel. The subsequent French court-martial not only absolved Deschateurs of any liability for the loss but also commended him for his conduct. Four days later Emerald arrived at Cork with Fanfaron and Luna. Fanfaron, with a crew of 113, had been carrying a cargo of flour, salt and other provisions, as well as iron, lead and nails, all for Guadeloupe. (Note: The report in Lloyd's List describes Fanfaron as being armed with 18 guns and having a crew of 135 men. Luna, of and from New York, Southwark, master, had been carrying cotton and rice for San Sebastián when Emerald detained her.)

At the beginning of February 1810, Emerald captured and sent into Plymouth, Commerce, Hanson, master, which had been sailing from Drontheim to Bordeaux. Then on 22 March, Emerald captured the 350-ton (bm) Belle Etoile in the Bay of Biscay. Caught after a twelve-hour chase during which she jettisoned much of her cargo; Belle Etoile, out of Bayonne, was pierced for 20 guns but only carried eight. Carrying a cargo of wine, flour, oil, and other merchandise to Île de France, she was sent into Cork with her 56-man crew. Emerald captured an American ship, Wasp, in July 1810. Wasp was carrying 91 passengers from New York to Bordeaux; they arrived at Plymouth on 30 July.

Emerald was still serving on the Irish Station on 11 April 1811 when she sent into Cork a French privateer. This was the 18-gun Auguste (or Augusta), which had been taken on 6 April. Shortly after this however, Emerald put into Portsmouth for a two-month refit prior to escorting a convoy to the Cape of Good Hope. The newly appointed governor of the colony, Lieutenant-General Sir John Craddock, his family and servants, joined Emerald for the journey. Following a stop-over at Madeira, Emerald left on 5 July, reportedly in the company of five East Indiamen (Note: The Indiamen were Minerva, Harleston, William Pitt, Lord Forbes, and Lady Lushington, all of which had arrived in Madeira three days earlier.) and was spotted by a transport ship on 18 July, escorting thirteen vessels off the coast of West Africa. (Note: The transport ship, Fanny was travelling from Rio de Janeiro to Portsmouth, and on her arrival reported Emerald and her convoy, "all well" at 13°2′N 24°0′W.)

== Fate ==
The journey to the Cape Colony, proved to be Emerald's last duty of note; she returned home in November 1811, and after transporting the captain's wine to the custom house in Portsmouth, was laid up in ordinary. She was fitted out as a receiving ship in 1822 but was eventually broken up in January 1836.
