= HMS Urchin =

There have been five ships of the Royal Navy to bear the name HMS Urchin after the Sea urchin:

- HMS Urchin (1797) was a gunvessel of 154 tons (bm), purchased in 1797 and stationed at Gibraltar. On 3 and 5 July 1797, she participated in an attack by Captain Horatio Nelson on Spanish gunboats during the Blockade of Cádiz (1797). Her commander, Lieutenant F. Browne, drowned in March 1799. His replacement apparently was Lieutenant William Davies. She was under the command of Lieutenant Thomas Pearson Croasdale and had a skeleton crew of only seven men when HMS Hector towed her in Tetuan Bay on 12 October 1800. Around midnight she capsized and sank, and although Hector lowered boats, they were only able to save two men.
- HMS Urchin (1800) was a gunboat of unknown origin. In December 1800 she shared with the frigate Florentina and the sloop Cynthia in the capture of three French merchant vessels carrying coffee, rice and sugar from Alexandria to France: the polacca Union (5 December), brig Bon Pasteur Retrouvé (7 December), and brig Heureuse Clairon (13 December). Then, under Lieutenant William Smith, she participated in Lord Keith's expedition to Egypt. Because Urchin served in the navy's Egyptian campaign (8 March to 2 September 1801), her officers and crew qualified to share in the prize money for the campaign, (Note: A first-class share of the prize money was worth £32 4s 4d; a fifth-class share, that of a seaman, was worth 3s 11½d.) and to receive the Naval General Service Medal with clasp "Egypt" that the Admiralty issued in 1847 to all surviving claimants. Urchin disappears from the record after 1801.
- HMS Urchin (1917) was a modified R-class destroyer built by Palmers Shipbuilding and Iron Company, launched in 1917 and sold in 1930.
- HMS Urchin was a U-class submarine, launched in 1940, and commissioned into the Polish Navy as ORP Sokół (1940). She was returned to Britain in 1946, reverting to the name HMS Urchin, and was scrapped in 1949.
- HMS Urchin (R99) was a U-class destroyer launched in 1943, and that served in the Second World War. She was converted into a Type 15 fast anti-submarine frigate and scrapped in 1967.
