= Spanish ship Conde de Regla =

Conde de Regla is the name of the following Spanish ships:

- Conde de Regla, a paddle steamer
- Conde de Regla, a 112-gun ship of the line launched in 1786

== See also ==
- List of historic Spanish Navy ships
- List of ships of the line of Spain
