= 8-pounder short gun =

French naval gun

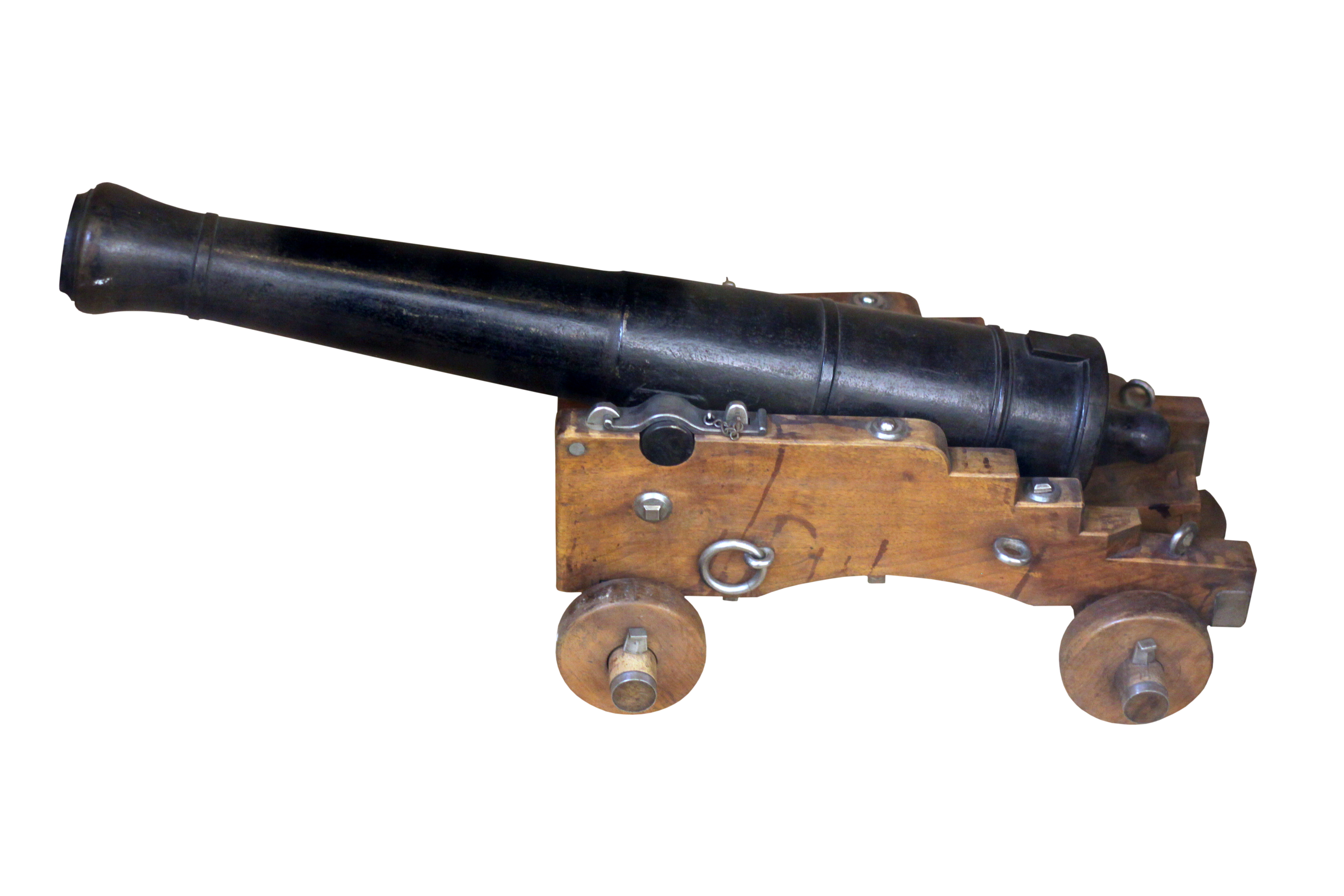
1/4the scale model of an 8-pounder short gun, 1786 pattern, with 1820 pattern mounting. On display at the Musée national de la Marine, Paris.

The 8-pounder short gun was a light calibre piece of artillery mounted on French warships of the Age of Sail. They were used as main guns on light ships of the early 19th century, and on the quarterdeck and forecastle of ships of the line. They were similar in design to the Canon de 8 Gribeauval.

== Usage ==
The 8-pounder was the heaviest of the light guns. As the short variant was relatively light, it could be mounted on the upper gun posts of ships of the line, where the timber of the deck was too light to support larger guns, and without jeopardising the stability of the ship. It was also used on frigates, xebecs and corvettes, as an addition to the larger guns of the main battery (usually 12- or 18-pounders, and sometimes 24-pounders).

Mounted on the sides of the ships, the 8-pounders reinforced the weight of the broadside. A long version of the same gun, the 8-pounder long gun, could be mounted at the bow or stern, parallel to the axis of the ship, and used as a chase gun.

== Sources and references ==
- (in French) Jean Boudriot et Hubert Berti, L'Artillerie de mer : marine française 1650-1850, Paris, éditions Ancre, 1992 (ISBN 2-903179-12-3) (notice BNF no FRBNF355550752).
- (in French) Jean Peter, L'artillerie et les fonderies de la marine sous Louis XIV, Paris, Economica, 1995, 213 p. (ISBN 2-7178-2885-0).
