= Spanish frigate Ninfa (1795) =

History

Spain
- Name: Ninfa
- Namesake: Nymph
- Launched: 1794 or 1795
- Completed: 1795
- Captured: 26 April 1797

Great Britain
- Name: HMS Hamadryad
- Namesake: Hamadryad
- Acquired: 26 April 1797
- Commissioned: June 1797
- Fate: Wrecked 25 December 1797

General characteristics
- Type: 36-gun frigate
- Tons burthen: 890 (bm)
- Propulsion: Sail
- Complement: 264
- Armament: Gun deck: 26 × 12-pounder guns; Quarterdeck: 8 × 6-pounder guns and 6 × 32-pounder carronades; Forecastle: 2 × 6-pounder guns and 2 × 32-pounder carronades

Ninfa was a 36-gun Spanish frigate built at Mahon, on the island of Minorca, between 1794 and 1795. She was captured by the British in an action on 26 April 1797 and taken into service as HMS Hamadryad. She sank in a storm on 25 December the same year.

== Construction ==
Ninfa was built at Mahon, on the island of Minorca, between 1794 and 1795. Her measurements were not recorded but she was known to be 890 tons burthen. As built, her armament comprised twenty-six 12-pounders on the main gundeck, eight 6-pounders and six 32-pound carronades on the quarterdeck, and two 6-pound guns with two 32-pound carronades on the forecastle.

== Capture ==
In April 1797, Ninfa and a similar frigate, Santa Elena, were bound for Cádiz with a cargo of silver and would have blundered into a large blockading fleet under Sir John Jervis, were it not for a fortuitous encounter with some Spanish fishermen on the night of 25 April. Having been warned of the danger, the captains decided to transfer the precious cargo into the fishing boat and for the Spanish frigates to try to sneak into port by hugging the coastline. The following morning the 74-gun HMS Irresistible and the 36-gun frigate HMS Emerald spotted the Spanish frigates and pursued them. Outgunned, Ninfa and Santa Elena chose to seek shelter in Conil Bay, hoping the hazard of Laja de Cape Rocha, a large rocky ledge in the entrance, would deter the British from following. However, the British vessels rounded the rocks and entered the bay to engage the ships anchored there. After an action lasting around 1 1/2 hours, both the Spanish frigates struck. Before she could be taken possession of however, Santa Elena cut her cable and drifted onto the shore where she was so badly damaged that when the British tried to refloat her, she sank.

== British service ==
After her capture, Ninfa was taken into Gibraltar where she was commissioned under Thomas Elphinstone as HMS Hamadryad. On 30 June 1797, she captured a Spanish privateer off the Rock, and on 3 July she captured another privateer in the Straits, Actaeon. Her British career was cut short however when she sank whilst trying to shelter from a storm in Algiers Bay, on 25 December 1797.
