= HMS Irresistible (1782) =

Ship of the line of the Royal Navy

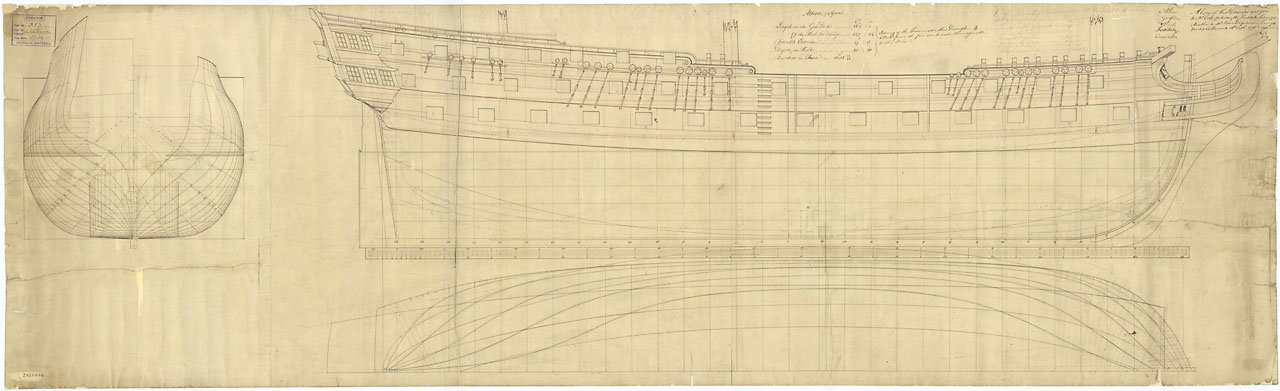

History

Great Britain
- Name: HMS Irresistible
- Ordered: 8 July 1778
- Builder: Barnard, Harwich
- Laid down: October 1778
- Launched: 6 December 1782
- Fate: Broken up, 1806
- Notes: Participated in: Battle of Groix; Battle of Cape St Vincent

General characteristics
- Class & type: Albion-class ship of the line
- Tons burthen: 1643 (bm)
- Length: 168 ft (51 m) (gundeck)
- Depth of hold: 18 ft 10 in (5.74 m)
- Propulsion: Sails
- Sail plan: Full-rigged ship
- Armament: Gundeck: 28 × 32-pounder guns; Upper gundeck: 28 × 18-pounder guns; QD: 14 × 9-pounder guns; Fc: 4 × 9-pounder guns

HMS Irresistible was a 74-gun third rate ship of the line of the Royal Navy, launched on 6 December 1782 at Harwich.

== Career ==
Irresistible captured the French privateer Quatre frères in April 1797 in the Mediterranean. The Royal Navy took her into service as HMS Transfer.

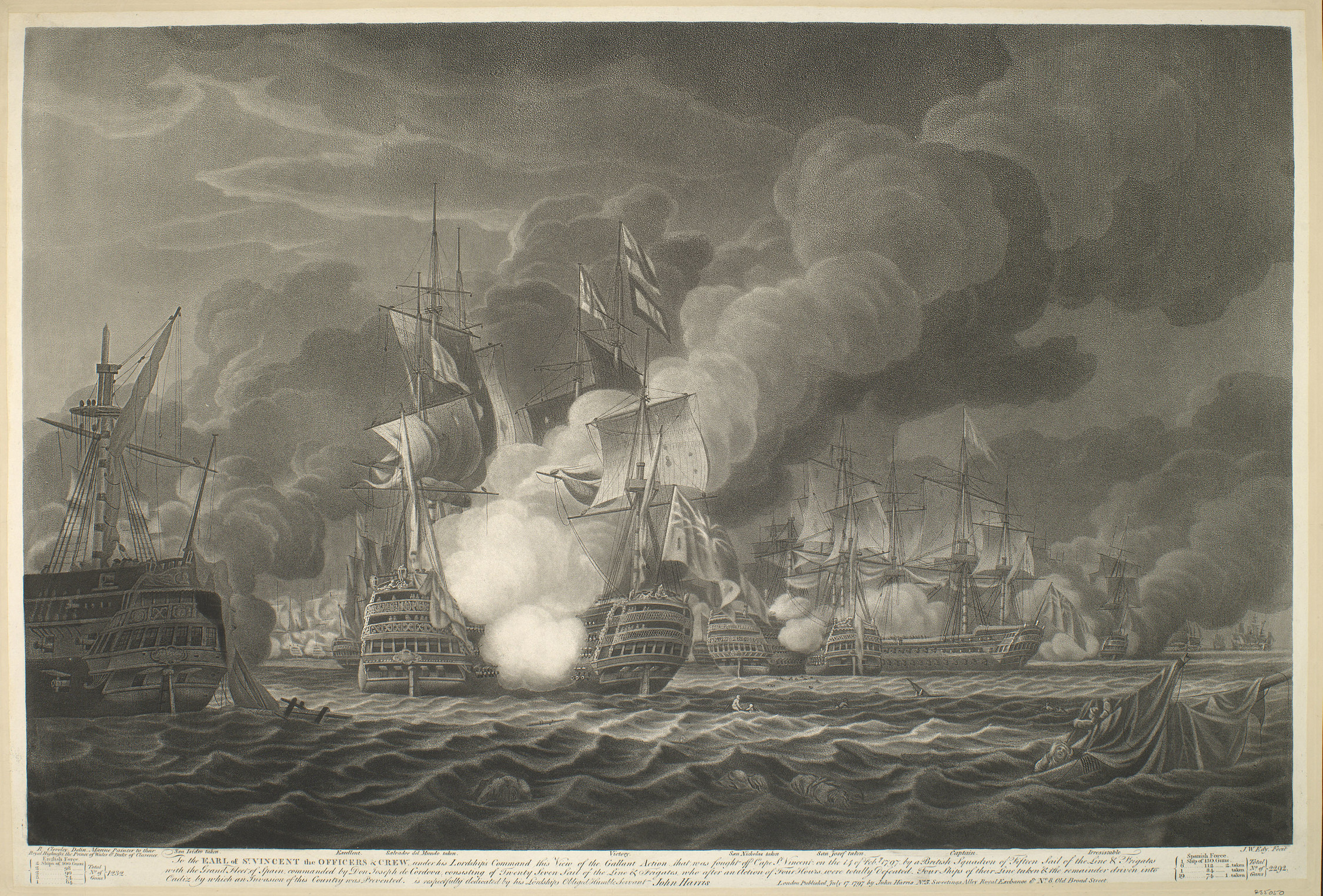
Shows Irresistible at Cape St Vincent, 1797

Irresistible fought at the Battle of Groix in 1795, and at the Battle of Cape St Vincent in 1797 and captured two Spanish frigates at the action of 26 April 1797.

== Fate ==
Irresistible was broken up in 1806.
