= Croisière de Bruix =

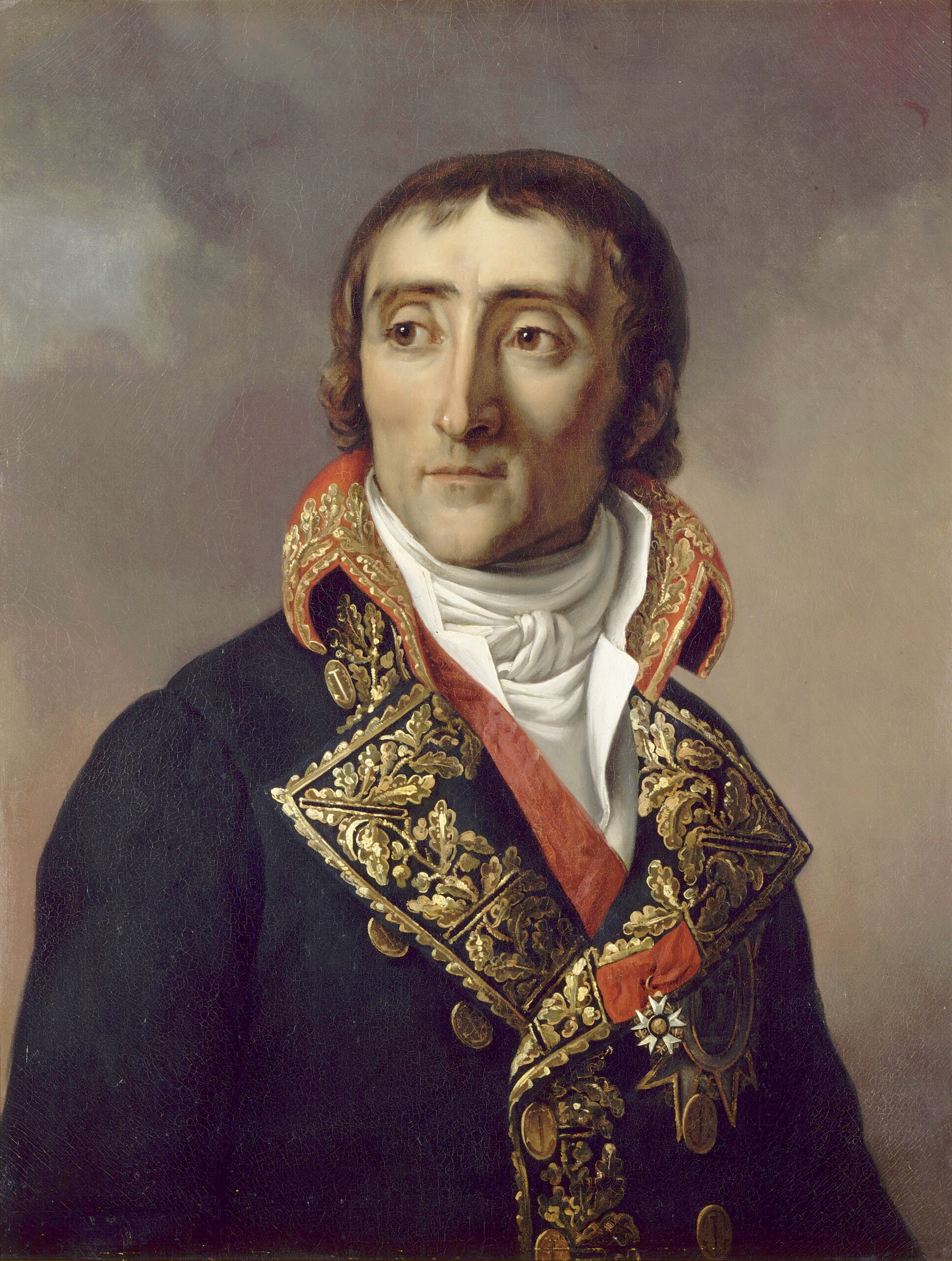
Étienne Eustache Bruix, the commander of the campaign

The Croisière de Bruix (also known as Bruix' expedition of 1799) was the principal naval campaign of the year 1799 during the French Revolutionary Wars. The expedition began in April 1799 when the bulk of the French Atlantic Squadron under Vice-admiral Étienne Eustache Bruix departed the base at Brest, evading the British Channel Fleet which was blockading the port and tricking the commander Admiral Lord Bridport into believing their true destination was Ireland. Passing southwards, the French fleet narrowly missed joining with an allied Spanish Navy squadron at Ferrol and was prevented by an easterly gale from uniting with the main Spanish fleet at Cádiz before entering the Mediterranean Sea. The Mediterranean was under British control following the destruction of the French Mediterranean Fleet at the Battle of the Nile in August 1798, and a British fleet nominally under Admiral Earl St Vincent was stationed there. Due however to St. Vincent's ill-health, operational control rested with Vice-Admiral of the Red Lord Keith. As Keith sought to chase down the French, the Spanish fleet followed Bruix into the Mediterranean before being badly damaged in a gale and sheltering in Cartagena.

Bruix successfully evaded Keith's pursuit, briefly putting in at Toulon and then operating off the Italian coast in June. Keith belatedly followed Bruix' trail, his progress obstructed by distant orders from St Vincent and disobedience from Vice-Admiral Lord Nelson who commanded a separate squadron at Palermo and refused to participate in the campaign due to his preoccupation with the political situation in Naples. By the time Keith reached Toulon the French admiral had sailed westwards once more, joining with the Spanish force at Cartagena to form a fleet of 40 ships of the line. In early July, unaware that Bruix had returned through the Straits of Gibraltar to the Atlantic, Keith was joined by a heavy reinforcement sent by Bridport and reprovisioned his force at Port Mahon and Gibraltar before renewing the chase. During late July and early August Keith pursued Bruix into the Atlantic and rapidly closed the gap between the fleets as they crossed the Bay of Biscay. Ultimately however Bruix reached Brest on 13 August, just one day ahead of Keith, unopposed by the remainder of Bridport's fleet which was stationed off Rochefort blockading a Spanish squadron from Ferrol anchored there.

Although Bruix achieved the union of the French and Spanish fleets, his operation made little difference to the ongoing strategic situation, the combined allied fleet remaining inactive at Brest for the next two years. During his time in the Mediterranean Bruix failed to exert any significant influence on the region: in June he escorted a supply convoy to the Northwestern Italian coast, but the smaller British and Russian forces operating off Malta, Corfu and Alexandria were left unmolested, and those blockades continued with minimal disruption. In the aftermath Keith was criticised for his failure to bring the French and Spanish fleets to action, although interference and disobedience among his fellow commanders also contributed heavily to Bruix' escape.

== Background ==
At the start of 1799 the Royal Navy exercised dominance in European waters during the French Revolutionary Wars. In Northern Europe the Channel Fleet blockaded the French Navy's Atlantic Squadron, with the squadron's base at Brest in Brittany especially targeted. Although the Brest fleet was strong, numbering 25 ships of the line with five more nearing completion, it had suffered a series of defeats that had left it demoralised. In June 1794 seven ships had been lost at the battle of the Glorious First of June when it sallied out to successfully protect a grain convoy, five more sank in winter storms during the disastrous Croisière du Grand Hiver operation early in 1795 and in June of that year three more were lost at the Battle of Groix. During the Expédition d'Irlande in December 1796 another two ships were lost, a ship was lost in the approaches to Brest itself at the Battle of the Raz de Sein in April 1798 and in October 1798 a belated attempt to influence the Irish Rebellion had been crushed at the Battle of Tory Island, with further losses. British squadrons patrolled the approaches to Brest and the other harbours along the Bay of Biscay, supported by the main body of the Channel Fleet, consisting of 19 ships of the line under the command of the 72-year-old Admiral Lord Bridport.

In Southern Europe the French position was altogether more desperate. In the summer of 1798 the French Mediterranean Fleet had departed its base of Toulon escorting a large fleet of transports carrying an army under General Napoleon Bonaparte for the Invasion of Egypt. The French had believed that their passage would be unopposed as the Royal Navy had abandoned the Mediterranean Sea in 1796 following the Treaty of San Ildefonso, under the secret terms of which the Kingdom of Spain had made peace with the French Republic and declared war on Great Britain. Retreating to the base at Lisbon, the British Mediterranean Fleet under Vice-Admiral Sir John Jervis had concentrated on blockading the main Spanish Fleet based at Cádiz. On 14 February 1797 the Spanish had suffered a defeat at the Battle of Cape St Vincent, for which Jervis was made Earl of St Vincent, and the Spanish retreated to Cádiz, remaining in harbour for the next two years.

To intercept the French expedition to Egypt, Lord Spencer at the Admiralty in London ordered Earl St. Vincent to dispatch a fleet of his own under Rear-Admiral Sir Horatio Nelson. Nelson tracked the French across the Mediterranean but was unable to discover the invasion fleet until after the troops were ashore. On 1 August 1798 Nelson attacked the French fleet anchored in Aboukir Bay near Alexandria. The ensuing Battle of the Nile was a crushing victory for Nelson: eleven of the 13 French ships of the line were captured or destroyed and Napoleon's army was trapped in Egypt. The destruction of the French fleet encouraged the allies to form a new coalition against the French and the War of the Second Coalition began soon afterwards. Royal Navy forces returned to the Mediterranean and blockades were imposed on the principal French bases, including Alexandria and Malta under the command of Nelson at Palermo with three ships on each station. The Spanish base at Port Mahon on Menorca was captured by a British expeditionary force in November 1798 and it was there that St. Vincent, suffering from a prolonged bout of ill-health, had retired, leaving command of the Cádiz blockade fleet to Vice-Admiral of the Red Lord Keith. Keith mustered 16 ships of the line and could potentially call on Nelson and the squadron under Rear-Admiral John Thomas Duckworth at Menorca should he require their assistance. The 19 ships of the Spanish fleet at Cádiz were the only remaining force in Southern Europe that could trouble British control of the Mediterranean.

== Expedition ==
=== Departure from Brest ===
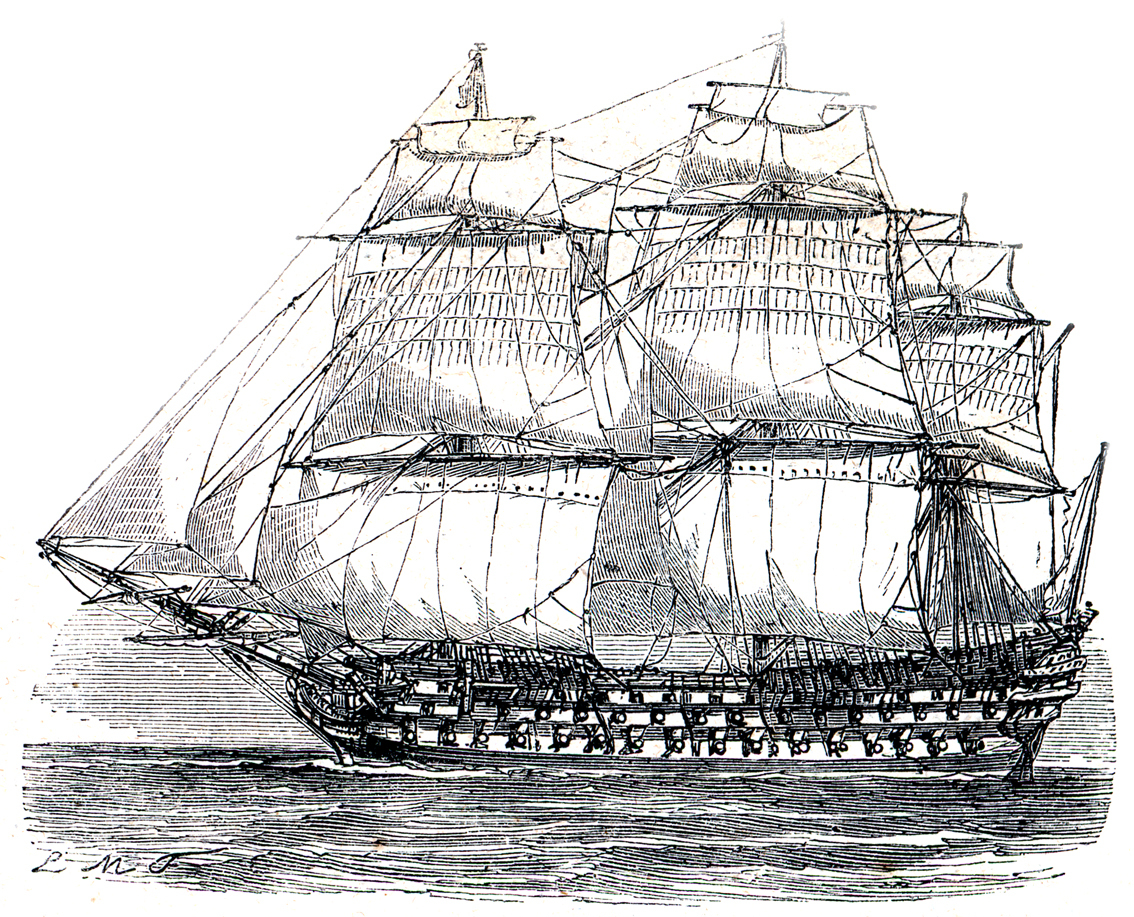
Océan, the flagship of the expedition

In early 1799 the French Directory ordered the commander of the Atlantic Squadron, Vice-admiral Étienne Eustache Bruix, to take his fleet to sea with the express intention of ending British naval dominance in the Mediterranean and relieving Napoleon's trapped army in Egypt. The force Bruix mustered was one of the most numerous and strongest fleets to sail during the French Revolutionary Wars. It included four ships of more than 100 guns, two 80-gun and nineteen 74-gun ships of the line accompanied by six frigates, two corvettes and two avisos. The ships were fully manned, the 100-gun ships carrying more than a thousand crew each and the total number of sailors estimated at 23,761 with an additional 100 soldiers. Unusually for a French fleet of this era, the crews were also experienced men; many having served in the squadrons of French gunboats that defended the coast against the blockade squadrons of the Royal Navy.

Bruix' orders were to reclaim the Mediterranean by relieving Malta and the island of Corfu which, unbeknownst to the French, had just fallen to a Russian expeditionary force. The fleet was then instructed to convoy supplies and reinforcements to the army in Egypt. The destination of this force was well hidden: French newspapers announced the intention of the fleet was to convey another expeditionary force to Ireland following the failure at Tory Island in October 1798. On 27 April 1799, when the French fleet was already at sea, the chasse-marée Rebecca allowed herself to be captured by the British hired armed lugger Black Joke. On board Rebecca was a French Navy captain who was carrying false dispatches that identified Ireland as the intended target. This information encouraged the British Admiralty to consider Ireland the most likely target. They consequently ordered Bridport to make the defence of Ireland his highest priority, although many naval officers questioned the circumstances in which Rebecca was captured, correctly guessing that the dispatches were fakes.

The blockade of Brest had been prosecuted since January 1799 by a large battle squadron while the majority of the Channel Fleet waited for the calmer spring weather: Bridport's main force departed the anchorage at St Helens on 13 April. On 16 April the blockade squadron sighted and chased a French resupply convoy, which reached Brest unmolested; Bridport arrived the following day. on 25 April he sent scouts to investigate Brest, discovering 18 ships of the line ready to sail. Due to strong northeasterly winds, Bridport then ordered his fleet to sail out of the Iroise Passage at the entrance to Brest Roadstead and hold station instead to the southwest of the island of Ushant. Bridport's movement had left a significant gap in the blockade: taking advantage of the empty Iroise, Bruix ordered his fleet to sea on the evening of 25 April passing through the Iroise and then southwards around the Saintes Rocks. On the morning of 26 April the patrolling British frigate HMS Nymphe under Captain Percy Fraser discovered the French fleet and immediately sailed in search of Bridport, discovering the Channel Fleet at 13:00 and signalling the presence of the French to HMS Dragon, which passed the message on to the admiral. Bridport's first reaction was to return to the Iroise and determine the truth of Fraser's report. On discovering that the French had indeed sailed, he sent messages to the Admiralty, Lord Keith and Earl St. Vincent and then turned his ships north with instructions for reinforcements to join him off Cape Clear. By 30 April he had mustered 26 ships of the line off the Irish Coast in anticipation of the arrival of the French force, which he still expected imminently despite warnings from British merchant captains that the French had been sighted sailing southwest.

=== Cádiz ===
Bruix was not sailing to Ireland. Passing far out into the Atlantic, the French fleet, described as "one of the best manned and best found fleets that ever issued from a French harbour", turned southwest on 30 April for the coast of Spain, passing the base at Ferrol. Bruix had hoped to bring out the five ships of the Spanish squadron in the port, but these ships had already sailed to Corunna in anticipation of Bruix' arrival and the two forces missed one another. Continuing southwards, Bruix' force sighted a sail on 1 May while 105 nautical miles (194 km) west of the Portuguese city of Porto. Bruix sent frigates in pursuit of the stranger but was unable to catch it, and the new arrival, the British frigate HMS Success under Captain Shuldham Peard was able to escape to the south at 16:00 on 2 May. Peard sailed directly for the Cádiz blockade fleet under Keith, which had just returned to its station after replenishing its supplies at Tétouan and on 3 May he notified the admiral of the size of the approaching fleet. Although Keith had only 15 ships under his command, he ordered his force to prepare for battle.

At 08:30 on 4 May the French fleet was sighted to the northwest. With the British fleet deployed in a line of battle between Bruix' force and Cádiz, the French admiral ordered his ships to tack to port towards the northeast. Keith, who later said that he was "between the devil and the deep sea", manoeuvred his forces so that his fleet was sailing parallel with the French, still blocking access to Cádiz in the face of a rising storm. Recognising that access to the port was blocked and that conditions made it impossible for the Spanish fleet, trapped in Cádiz by the wind, to join his force, Bruix followed his standing orders to avoid delay through battle and turned his fleet away to the southwest. By 17:00 the French force had disappeared, although four stragglers were sighted on the morning of 5 May. As Keith maintained station off the Spanish port, Bruix made use of the storm to blow his ships straight through the Straits of Gibraltar, from where they were sighted at 17:00 on 5 May. As they passed through the straits, two of the French fleet collided with one another and were badly damaged, concerning Bruix sufficiently to alter his plans and steer for Toulon. As the French pushed eastwards, Keith cast south for them on 6 May, cruising off Cape Spartel. The British fleet returned to Cádiz on 8 May and observed that the Spanish fleet was not ready to put to sea, although a French ship damaged in the storm, Censeur, had managed to enter the port for urgent repairs. On 9 May Keith received orders from St Vincent to abandon the Cádiz blockade and pursue Bruix into the Mediterranean and so he sailed for the Bay of Gibraltar. Due to the storm, dispatch vessels could not sail westwards through the Straits and St Vincent was forced to send the orders overland, arranging special diplomatic passage for a courier to Lisbon who made his way to Faro and from there procured passage to Cádiz Bay.

At Gibraltar, St Vincent had sent a flurry of instructions, recalling HMS Edgar from Tétouan and ordering the seriously ill Rear-Admiral Thomas Frederick to make it his flagship. Warnings were sent to the other British officers commanding stations in the Mediterranean, including Duckworth at Menorca, Nelson at Palermo, Alexander Ball at the Siege of Malta and Sir Sidney Smith off Alexandria. Additional support was also urgently requested from Bridport, although reinforcements from that quarter would take weeks to arrive. The only immediate response was from Nelson, who withdrew Ball's forces from Malta and took a station off Marettimo with seven ships, pledging that "the squadron under my command shall never fall into the hands of the enemy; and before we are destroyed the enemy shall have their wings so completely clipped they shall be easily overtaken by you." Keith's force arrived at Gibraltar on 10 May and by 11 May was reprovisioned and ready to continue the pursuit with St. Vincent now in command, passing through a severe gale on 17 and 18 May to unite with Duckworth's four ships off Menorca on 20 May. The only ship damaged in the storm was Edgar, which had grounded and was forced to make repairs in Port Mahon.

In early May the Spanish squadron at Ferrol, having missed Bruix at Corunna, came under observation by the large 44-gun frigate HMS Indefatigable under Captain Henry Curzon. On 8 May Curzon sailed in search of Bridport to warn him that the Ferrol squadron was at sea, and in his absence the Spanish sailed from Corunna, intending to anchor at Brest and await the French return. Concerned about meeting Bridport's fleet off the port however the Spanish squadron eventually put into Rochefort instead. On 1 June Bridport finally realised that the Irish invasion plan had been a ruse and detached a fleet of 16 ships under Admiral Sir Alan Gardner to join Keith in the Mediterranean. Bridport then stationed eight ships and four frigates off Rochefort under Rear-Admiral Charles Maurice Pole accompanied by three bomb vessels. On 2 July, Pole sent the bomb vessels and frigates into Basque Roads to attack the anchored Spanish squadron, which responded with a squadron of gunboats. Although the two sides bombarded one another throughout the day there were no casualties or serious damage, the British withdrawal allowing the French government to pronounce the engagement as a victory. The Spanish squadron remained under blockade throughout the remainder of the campaign, eventually slipping past Pole's force in September and, after an abortive attempt to reach Brest, retiring to Ferrol.

=== Toulon, Genoa and Cartagena ===
While Keith was entering the Mediterranean, Bruix used the favourable winds to carry him northeast unmolested, protecting his damaged ships and reaching Toulon safely on 13 May. On 22 May St Vincent's fleet of 20 ships sailed from Port Mahon, intending to pursue Bruix to Toulon. On 26 May however news reached St Vincent of a threat to his rear: the Spanish fleet at Cádiz had finally put to sea. The fleet had departed on 14 May under the command of Admiral Mazarredo with 17 ships, passing Gibraltar and turning northeast in search of Bruix. The Spanish ships were in poor condition however and the storm of 17 May inflicted enormous damage, with 12 ships no longer seaworthy. Hastily abandoning plans to follow Bruix, Mazarredo turned his fleet towards the safety of Cartagena, the principal Spanish Mediterranean naval base, arriving on 20 May. Perceiving the Spanish as the greater threat, St Vincent ordered his ships to hold station at Cape San Sebastian in Girona in case the fleets attempted to combine.

As St Vincent patrolled the Spanish coast, Bruix's fleet returned to sea on 27 May, accompanied by eleven smaller warships and two small ships of the line laden with stores and provisions armed en flute. The two damaged ships remained in harbour and so the force mustered 22 ships of the line. In Northern Italy French forces had been forced back by the Austrian Army and Bruix was ordered to resupply besieged French cities along the coast. Sailing eastwards unopposed, the fleet anchored off Vado Ligure on 30 May and the troops carried aboard were landed for service against the Austrian and Russian armies then engaged against the French in Northern Italy, relieving the besieged city of Savona. On 3 June the fleet arrived at Genoa, under siege with the defence led by General André Masséna. On 5 June the fleet disembarked the stores and provisions for General Jean Moreau's army, the general holding a conference on Bruix' flagship Océan. On 6 June, following reports that the British fleet had appeared off Toulon, Bruix sailed from Genoa, his fleet returning westward to Toulon.

While Bruix was supplying the French armies in Northern Italy, St Vincent's fleet had been augmented on 30 May by a squadron of five ships under Rear-Admiral James Hawkins-Whitshead. This reinforcement persuaded St Vincent to send Rear-Admiral Duckworth and four ships to join Nelson at Palermo in case he should come under attack by the French. On 1 June, St Vincent cast south off Barcelona in the hope of encountering the Spanish fleet and then, finding nothing, returned northeastwards towards Toulon. On 2 June St Vincent's health failed and he turned command over to Keith, taking his flagship HMS Ville de Paris back to Port Mahon. Keith continued to Toulon and on 3 June sent HMS Centaur and HMS Montagu to scout the port. These ships intercepted a coastal convoy at the entrance to the harbour, burning four settees and coming under ineffective fire from the Toulon batteries. From prisoners removed from the settees, it was learned that Bruix was at sea to the eastwards and Keith immediately acted on the information by setting off in pursuit. Off Fréjus Keith's force encountered the British armed brig Telegraph the commander of which reported that the French were off Vado Ligure. The following day the British fleet passed Antibes where batteries on offshore islands opened an ineffective fire on the attached brig HMS Espoir.

=== Return to the Atlantic ===
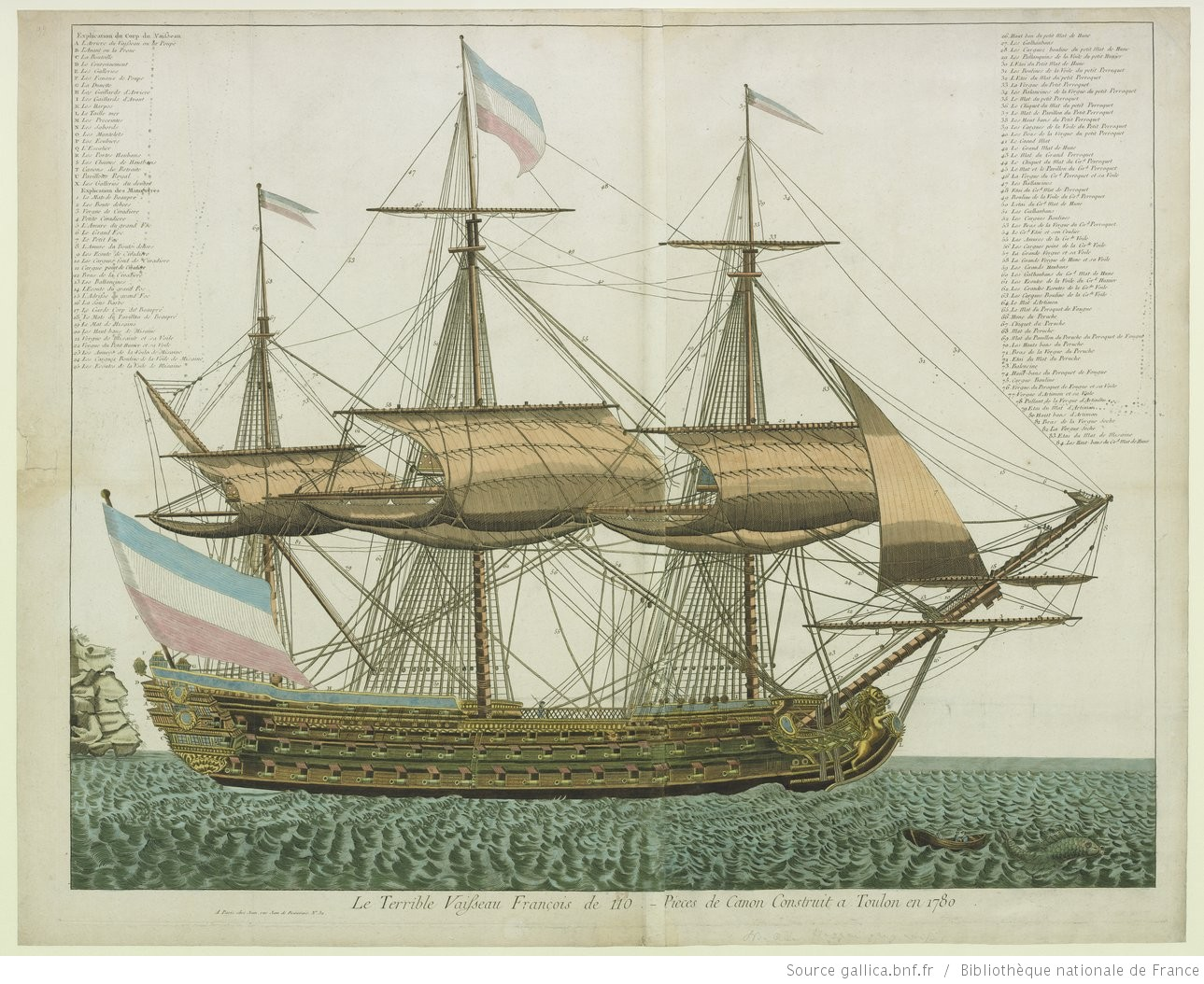
Terrible, which took part in the expedition

On 8 June, off Cape delle Melle, dispatches reached the fleet from St Vincent, who ordered Keith to abandon pursuit and return to Rosas to prevent a junction of the French fleet and the Spanish in Cartagena. Keith was also instructed to send two more ships to Nelson at Palermo with orders to take his squadron, now mustering 18 ships of the line including three Portuguese vessels by withdrawing Ball's blockade force from Malta, in search of the French fleet. Nelson angrily refused Keith's order. Since late 1798, Nelson had become embroiled in the politics of the Kingdom of Naples, having encouraged King Ferdinand to go to war with France. The Neapolitan army had been defeated, Naples fell to the French armies and the city became the centre of the short-lived Parthenopean Republic. Nelson had evacuated the Neapolitan royal family to Palermo and made a personal vow to Queen Maria Carolina not to leave them unsupported. He had also begun his notorious affair with Emma, Lady Hamilton, wife of the British ambassador to Naples Sir William Hamilton. To follow Keith's orders would have meant breaking his promise and abandoning both women in Palermo. He was also concerned for his reputation: the French force was significantly stronger than his own fleet both in number and size of ships and a battle could well have ended in defeat, while to refuse combat would have been heavily criticised in Britain.

Keith, concerned for the undefended base at Menorca, did not steer for Rosas immediately. Instead he first sailed via the island to collect Ville de Paris, which had left St Vincent at Port Mahon. On 13 June, Keith took over HMS Queen Charlotte as his flagship and on 15 June Ville de Paris rejoined the fleet, following which Keith turned northwards towards Cape Sicie near Toulon. On 19 June, 60 nautical miles (110 km) south of Toulon, the advance squadron of Keith's fleet encountered a squadron of French frigates. This force, consisting of the frigates Junon, Alceste and Courageuse and the brigs Alerte and Salamine was under the command of Contre-Amiral Jean-Baptiste Perrée, sailing to Toulon from Jaffa. The squadron had been protecting French coastal supply convoys during Bonaparte's Syrian Campaign: on 4 May Salamine had captured the 10-gun polacre HMS Fortune off Jaffa. Ordered to return to France, the squadron had departed Jaffa on 17 May and had almost reached Toulon when it was discovered.

Perrée's force was unable to outrun Keith's advance squadron of ships of the line HMS Captain, HMS Centaur and HMS Bellona with frigates HMS Emerald and HMS Santa Teresa in support. Faced with overwhelming opposition, the French squadron surrendered, all five ships subsequently being commissioned into the Royal Navy, although Junon, renamed HMS Princess Charlotte, was considered to be a more valuable prize than all of the others together. On 20 June Keith arrived off Toulon to find that the French fleet was not in the harbour. He remained off the port until 23 June in the hope of their arrival and then turned eastwards to investigate first Vado Ligure and then Genoa, where coastal forts fired on the scouting brig-sloop HMS Vincejo, which escaped by hosting a false Spanish flag. Learning off Genoa that the French fleet had departed over a month ago, Keith turned back towards Menorca.

Bruix had in fact stolen a considerable march on Keith's pursuit. Having left Genoa on 6 June, the French fleet passed Toulon on 9 June without stopping. As Keith waited off Menorca', Bruix sailed down the Spanish coastline and arrived off Cartagena on 22 June while Keith was watching Toulon. The Spanish fleet had conducted extensive repairs in the month since the storm in the Straits of Gibraltar and was almost ready for sea once more, the combined fleets now mustering 39 ships, having left Censeur at Cádiz and two more French ships at Toulon for urgent repairs. At Cartagena the combined fleet assisted in the loading of a troop convoy carrying 5,000 Spanish soldiers to reinforce the garrison at Mallorca and sailed on 24 June for Cádiz.

Keith's 19 ships arrived off Menorca once again on 6 July and the following day joined with the substantial reinforcement of 12 ships of the line commanded by Rear-Admiral Sir Charles Cotton and Rear-Admiral Cuthbert Collingwood. This force had been detached from the Channel Fleet by Lord Bridport following his realisation that the French fleet was not intended for Ireland. It had originally included 16 vessels, but four had detached under Admiral Gardner at Lisbon where he had encountered the convoy of prizes returning slowly from the Nile and the large annual merchant convoy from Portugal, both of which Gardner escorted back to Britain safely. Thus reinforced, Keith entered Port Mahon to procure water only to learn of the French arrival at Cartagena. By 10 July the British fleet was ready to sail, Keith twice ordering Nelson to detach ships from his squadron to protect Menorca. Nelson however had by this time abandoned his station at Marettimo without orders and was, at the request of Queen Maria Carolina, stationed in the Bay of Naples. Nelson had previously ignored Keith's orders to focus on his operations around Naples, but on 22 July eventually sent a small squadron to Menorca. Aware that the combined fleet would not stay at Cartagena, Keith sailed for Gibraltar directly, collecting more supplies at Tétouan on 26 July and entering the Straits on 29 July.

=== Retirement to Brest ===
The combined fleet was at this stage three weeks ahead of Keith's pursuit. During the night of 7 July Bruix' force had passed Gibraltar, the Spanish ships randomly firing on two Algerian ships as they passed. At Gibraltar St. Vincent, who was traveling back to Britain on the frigate HMS Argo and had paused in the port, ordered a ship to be sent to investigate the firing and dispatched the 18-gun hired armed cutter Penelope under Lieutenant Frederick Lewis Maitland. As dawn rose on 8 July, Maitland found that he had sailed into the Spanish division of the fleet. In calm conditions, Maitland managed to drive off the Spanish brig Vivo but was forced to surrender soon afterwards to the frigate Nuestra Señora del Carmén. In the hold the captors found a large cargo of specie that inadvertently had been left on board.

Between 10 and 12 July the combined fleet arrived at Cádiz, where the two ships left at Toulon rejoined the fleet, although Censeur was discovered to be damaged beyond repair and so was transferred to the Spanish Navy, the French receiving the ship of the line San Sebastian, renamed Alliance, in return. On 21 July, with no sign of the British blockade returning, Bruix' fleet put to sea again, although the 112-gun Spanish ships Mexicano and Santa Ana were forced to return after Santa Ana ran aground while leaving the harbour. Bruix's fleet now numbered 59 ships, of which 40 were ships of the line. The combined fleet turned north, passing up the Portuguese coast.

On 30 July, nine days after Bruix' departure, Keith's fleet sailed from Gibraltar. Over the next nine days the British fleet followed Bruix, although Keith was unsure of his location or destination. On 8 August off Cape Finisterre a Danish ship reported sighting the combined fleet two days previously to the northeast. The following day the frigate HMS Stag under Captain Joseph Sydney Yorke joined the fleet having sighted Bruix' force off Cape Ortegal sailing for the Bay of Biscay. On 12 August the British fleet was 80 nautical miles (92 mi; 150 km) from Ushant with no sign of the combined fleet and on 14 August Keith sent a scouting squadron to investigate the Roadstead of Brest. This force, consisting of HMS Impetueux, HMS Pompee, and HMS Ethalion under the command of Captain Sir Edward Pellew, closed with the anchorage and discovered the combined fleet there. Bruix had arrived only the day before.

== Aftermath ==
For all the vast effort expended by both sides, the Croisière de Bruix comprised a catalogue of failures. Bruix had successfully evaded pursuit by the main strength of the Royal Navy for more than three months, undermined British control of the Mediterranean and had united with the principal Spanish fleet to create the largest fleet anywhere in the world at that time: some 47 ships of the line. This force was now anchored in the strongest French Atlantic naval base which ostensibly controlled access to the English Channel. For the next two and a half years, until the Peace of Amiens brought the French Revolutionary Wars to a close, the fleet remained at anchor: Bruix' expedition was the last time during the war that either the French or the Spanish deployed their full naval force. A major cause of this reluctance to sail was daily visible from Brest: The British Channel Fleet. Aware that losing control of the English Channel could mean an invasion of Britain, the Admiralty ordered a rejuvenated St. Vincent to assume command of the fleet, now numbering 30 ships of the line. St Vincent ordered his fleet to remain on constant vigil, only retiring from the blockade in the very worst weather, and then only to an offshore anchorage in Torbay, not to their home port at Spithead. In the wider strategic situation of Northern Europe, the Croisière de Bruix had achieved nothing: the English historian Nicholas A. M. Rodger described it as a "brilliant failure", noting that "Tactical skill combined with irrational and unpredictable changes of strategy had baffled British pursuit, but [Bruix] had made nothing of his opportunities to change the course of the war at sea."

In the Mediterranean theatre too, little had been achieved. The convoy operation to Genoa in June could have been equally achieved with a small frigate escort rather than the full force of the Atlantic Squadron, while the smaller allied forces in the Eastern Mediterranean could have been easily swept away by Bruix' superior numbers had he deployed them: Nelson at Palermo had only ten ships to protect the blockade forces at Malta and Alexandria and the Russians at the recently captured island of Corfu. Had Bruix sought to relieve these blockades the British would have been powerless to stop him. By failing to directly challenge British control of the Mediterranean and by removing the Spanish fleet from the region, Bruix' expedition actually weakened the French position still further, allowing the Russians control of the Adriatic Sea and the British to capture Malta in 1800 and Egypt in 1801 without opposition at sea.

For the Royal Navy the campaign highlighted serious problems in the highest command of the Mediterranean theatre. The infirmity of Earl St. Vincent did not prevent him from attempting to interfere with Keith's operational command at a distance, a situation that may have caused Keith to miss the French fleet in early June, when St Vincent ordered Keith to return to Rosas rather than continue pursuit towards Toulon, although historian William Laird Clowes lays the blame for this error with Keith. Keith compounded this confusion by returning to Menorca against instructions to collect Ville de Paris, which ship St Vincent had removed from the fleet to take him to Port Mahon. William James opines that a frigate would have sufficed without weakening Keith's fleet, although Clowes points out that in these strategic pursuits at sea the more agile frigates were more valuable than lumbering first rates. Further problems were caused by Nelson's deliberate obstruction at Palermo, which had forced Keith to cover a much wider range of the Mediterranean that he had intended. Nelson's reputation in Britain, which had been so concerned to protect, had been seriously damaged as a result. In summarising the confusion, historian Noel Mostert notes that "in such a strategic situation, blame could fly in any direction." Given the delays and missteps it was remarkable and a testament to the skill of his crews and captains that Keith made up so much distance in the final days of the campaign, and had the combined fleet had a little further to travel, he might have caught them.
