= Action of 7 July 1799 =

- Part of the Napoleonic Wars
| Date | 7 July 1799 |
| Location | Bay of Gibraltar |
| Result | Spanish victory |

Belligerents
| Spain | Great Britain |

Commanders and leaders
| Unknown | Frederick Lewis Maitland (POW) |

Strength
| 1 Frigate (34 guns) | 1 Cutter (18 guns) |

Casualties and losses
| Unknown | 1 Cutter captured |

The action of 7 July 1799 was a minor naval engagement of the Napoleonic Wars in which the Spanish 34-gun frigate Nuestra Señora del Carmén captured the Royal Navy's 18-gun hired armed cutter Penelope, which was under the command of Lieutenant Frederick Lewis Maitland.

== Background ==
In June 1799, the French and Spanish fleets under Admirals Mazarredo and Bruix, amounting to forty sail of the line, and upwards of thirty frigates and smaller vessels, joined up at Cartagena. On 7 July lookouts at Gibraltar saw the combined fleet close to the Barbary shore.

Some of the Spanish ships amused themselves by firing at two vessels belonging to the Algerines. Admiral Jervis, Earl of Saint Vincent, who was on board the 44-gun ship HMS Argo, at anchor in the bay and on the eve of his departure for England, sent Lieutenant Frederick Lewis Maitland in Penelope to reconnoiter and ascertain the cause of the firing. Maitland set sail towards Ceuta.

== Action ==
Anxious to gain the most accurate information, he stretched across the Gut with very light winds during the night, that was so pitchy dark and calm, that the cutter was unperceived by the combined fleet and so close among them, that the words of command in French and Spanish could be distinctly heard.

At daybreak on 7 July 1799 he found himself nearly within gunshot of the enemy's advanced ships, whose boats were instantly ordered by signal from the Spanish Admiral Mazarredo, to tow the Vivo, a brig of 16 guns, alongside Penelope; but on their arrival within shot from the Penelope, the reception she astonished them with was so spirited, that the Spaniards dropped astern again and retired, and a faint hope of escape appeared between the British sailors, for there being no wind, the cutter's boats were kept ahead all the forenoon, towing to the southward. Then every ship in that fleet, except one frigate, actually turned their heads to the southward to give chase to the cutter.

A breeze now springing up, the Spanish frigate Nuestra Señora del Carmén, armed with 34 guns, sailed up and placing herself about a cable's length on the cutter's weather-beam, fired a broadside. Maitland told his crew to lie down upon the deck till the frigate had discharged all her guns, but the frigate's fire was so heavy that it destroyed Penelope's rigging, rendering her unmanageable.

When Penelope struck her colours, an officer from the brig Vivo boarded and demanded that Lieutenant Maitland give up his sword. Maitland refused, stating that he had struck to the frigate. A boat from Nuestra Señora del Carmén arrived shortly and sent away the boat from Vivo. Penelope had on board a large sum of money, intended for Menorca, that had not been unloaded in the rush quit Gibraltar. When her crew found there was no chance of escape from the combined fleets, they made an attempt to plunder the treasure, which Maitland prevented.

When her crew found there was no chance of escape from the combined fleets, they made an attempt to plunder the treasure, which Lieutenant Maitland most honourably and successfully resisted, alleging that, as public property, it was lawful prize of the captors.

A boat took Maitland to the first rate Principe de Asturias, which bore the flag of Admiral Gravina. The admiral received him into his cabin and treated him with the utmost kindness.

== Aftermath ==
The day after his arrival at Cadiz, Admiral Mazarredo sent his captain to tell Maitland that the admiral was occupied in refitting his ships and so could not to see him. However, the admiral had stated that in a few days, when the combined fleet left port, Maitland would be released without an exchange for a Spanish officer held prisoner by the British.

When the fleet departed the Spanish returned Maitland to Gibraltar, as promised. Maitland then accompanied St. Vincent when he returned to England in August 1799.
