= Hired armed cutter Penelope =

History

Great Britain
- Name: Penelope
- Commissioned: 29 January 1794
- Fate: Captured 7 July 1799

Spain
- Acquired: 1799 by capture

General characteristics
- Type: Cutter
- Tons burthen: 18756/94 (bm)
- Armament: 16 × 4-pounder guns

His Majesty's hired armed cutter Penelope served the Royal Navy from 29 January 1794 until the Spanish Navy captured her off Gibraltar on 7 July 1799. The Spaniards then employed her as a guarda costa.

== Service ==
Lieutenant Robert Keen was appointed to command Penelope in 1793 and was promoted to Commander in 1797. On 9 October 1795 Penelope shared with a number of British warships in the recapture of the ship Kent.

In April 1797, Penelope was in the West Indies under the command of Lieutenant Daniel Burdwood. On 18 April, Vice-Admiral Sir Hyde-Parker ordered Captain Hugh Pigot to take his frigate Hermione, as well as the frigates Mermaid and Quebec, the brig Drake and Penelope to cut out 14 vessels at Jean-Rabel, Haiti. The squadron rendezvoused on the 19th and then the boats went in on the night of the 20th. They succeeded in bringing out nine vessels, all merchant vessels that French privateers had taken as prizes.

In late November Penelope was still under Burdwood's command when she captured a small French privateer cutter off the Start, which is some 16 leagues west of the Isle of Portland, on the English coast. The privateer had made no captures. This was probably Maria, for which prize money was payable a year later.

On 24 January 1798, Penelope captured the French privateer cutter Venturer (or Aventurier), ten leagues off the Start. Venturer was pierced for eight guns but carried only two 3-pounders, plus six swivel guns, together with small arms. She was three days out of Plempoull and had not taken any prizes.

At some point Penelope and the hired armed cutter Constitution shared in the proceeds of the capture of the Danish brig Neptunus.

Penelope then sailed to the Mediterranean. By this time she was under the command of Lieutenant Daniel Hamline (or Hamlyn). In the Mediterranean she carried despatches. For instance, on 12 May 1799, Admiral Nelson sent her to Malta with instructions for the British naval forces there and for the Russian admiral, who Nelson also thought was there. Penelope also captured or participated in the capture of the Spanish vessel Gaviota on 11 April.

== Capture ==
On 6 July Admiral Jervis sent his flag lieutenant, Lieutenant Frederick Maitland, to Penelope, to order her out from Gibraltar to reconnoitre and count a fleet that had been spotted sailing through the Straits and that Jervis believed was French.

When Maitland arrived however, he found that Hamline was sick and unable to take command. Maitland took over and sailed Penelope out. Because of the urgency of the mission, there was not enough time to unload £8000 (in dollars) on her that is variously described as pay for the forces in Minorca or cargo from two prizes that Penelope had captured earlier.

At 0400 hours the next morning Penelope was off Ceuta and Maitland counted 43 ships. (This was Bruix' expedition of 1799 returning to Cadiz.)

The Franco-Spanish fleet sent two frigates and a brig to intercept Penelope. Winds were light so she hoisted French colours as a ruse de guerre and used her sweeps to try to escape her pursuers. Still, the pursuers were gaining so Penelope deployed her boat to help tow her in an attempt to gain distance. Unfortunately, by 0730 hours a breeze had developed enabling the pursuers to get close enough to fire their chase guns. Maitland cut his boat loose and told her crew to head for Gibraltar while he tried to sail towards the North African shore.

By about 1130 hours one frigate was close enough to fire a broadside while the brig and the second frigate were still nearby. Maitland was forced to strike his colours. The brig Vigo sent a boat over to accept his surrender, but Maitland dismissed the officer in charge, saying that he had struck to the frigate. She was the 34-gun Nuestra Señora del Carmén and she took possession of Penelope.

== Post-script ==
After the Spanish fleet left Cadiz, Admiral Mazarredo had Maitland returned to Gibraltar. Mazeredo had discovered that Maitland was Lord St Vincent's flag lieutenant, and being under an obligation to St Vincent, set Maitland free and returned him to Gibraltar without requesting an exchange. In July Maitland returned to Britain with Admiral Jervis, in the Argo. Mazarredo also returned the personal effects of General Oakes, though both sides agreed that Penelope's crew had plundered these before the Spanish had taken possession. The Spaniards did take possession of the specie, which they took to Mahón.

Admiral Sir Kieth pursued Bruix to Brest but was not able to bring him to action.

The Spaniards discovered that a 13-year-old midshipman and four sailors of Penelope's crew were Spaniards. Mazarredo ordered all five held until it could be determined how and why they had come to serve in the Royal Navy.

The Spaniards took Penelope into port. There the Spanish Royal Navy acquired her for service as a guarda costa at Puerto Cabello.
