= HMS Carmen =

Frigate of the Spanish Navy (1771–1800) and Royal Navy (1800-1802)

History

Spain
- Name: Nuestra Señora del Carmén
- Namesake: Our Lady of Mount Carmel
- Builder: Ferrol, Spain
- Laid down: 17 June 1769
- Launched: 24 November 1770
- Fate: Captured 7 April 1800

Great Britain
- Name: HMS Carmen
- Namesake: Truncation of Spanish name
- Acquired: By capture 7 April 1800
- Commissioned: December 1800
- Honours and awards: Naval General Service Medal (NGSM) with clasp "Egypt"
- Fate: Sold February 1802

General characteristics
- Tons burthen: 90767/94 (bm)
- Length: 147 ft 2 in (44.9 m) (overall); 119 ft 9 in (36.5 m) (keel)
- Beam: 37 ft 9 in (11.5 m)
- Depth of hold: 11 ft 0 in (3.4 m)
- Complement: At capture: 140; British service: 260
- Armament: At capture: 36 guns; British service; Upper deck: 26 × 12-pounder guns; QD: 6 × 6-pounder guns; Fc: 2 × 6-pounder guns

HMS Carmen (often referred to as El Carmen, or sometimes Carmine, in historical documents), was a British Royal Navy frigate captured from the Spanish Navy in the Action of 7 April 1800. She previously served in the Spanish Navy as Nuestra Señora del Carmén from 1771 to 1800.

In Spanish service, Nuestra Señora del Carmén was named for Our Lady of Mount Carmel, a Roman Catholic title of the Blessed Virgin Mary. Nuestra Señora del Carmén operated against North African pirates, took part in the invasion of Algiers in 1775, saw combat in the Anglo-French War of 1778–1783, participated in the bombardment of Algiers in 1783, and fought in the French Revolutionary Wars.

As HMS Carmen, the ship served in the Royal Navy for about a year during the War of the Second Coalition, operating in the Mediterranean Sea until she arrived in the United Kingdom in 1801. There the Admiralty had her laid up in ordinary in December 1801. She was sold in February 1802.

== Construction ==
Designed by the Spanish naval architect Francisco Gautier, Nuestra Señora del Carmén was constructed at Ferrol, Spain. Both her keel and that of her sister ship Nuestra Señora del Rosario were laid down on 17 June 1769. Nuestra Señora del Carmén was launched on 24 November 1770.

== Spanish Navy service ==
=== 1771–1800 ===
Nuestra Señora del Carmén departed Ferrol in 1771 in company with the 70-gun ship of the line San Julián and the 34-gun frigate Santa Catalina for a transatlantic voyage. The ships arrived at Montevideo (then in the Banda Oriental, now in Uruguay) on 16 November 1771. Nuestra Señora del Carmén then served at the Montevideo naval station. On 23 March 1772 she began a voyage to the Islas Malvinas (known to the British as the Falkland Islands) carrying a cargo of provisions, and returned to Montevideo after her stay in the islands. She departed Montevideo on 16 May 1773 to return to Spain, arriving at Cádiz on 13 August 1773 in company with the Spanish frigate, carrying treasure and other cargo.

With 182 sailors and 82 marines aboard, Nuestra Señora del Carmén participated in the Spanish invasion of Algiers in July 1775.

On 30 September 1776, Nuestra Señora del Carmén became the flagship of a division of frigates and xebecs under the command of Capitán de navío (Captain) Félix Ignacio de Tejada. Tejada's division encountered two Algerian privateers — one of 36 guns and the other of 24 guns — in the Mediterranean Sea off the coast of North Africa and attacked them, burning one and forcing the other aground in the bay at Melilla. The division also recaptured a Portuguese packet ship taken by the Moorish pirates, bombarded a Moorish artillery battery at Melilla, and at Algiers withstood the gunfire of Moorish coastal artillery to recover a Spanish merchant frigate from Barcelona which an Algerian xebec had captured 10 days earlier.

Nuestra Señora del Carmén underwent a refit at the Arsenal de La Carraca in San Fernando, Spain, in November 1777. She then made several voyages to the Azores.

After Spain entered the Anglo=French War of 1778–1783 on the side of France, Nuestra Señora del Carmén got underway from Cádiz on 23 June 1779 as part of a Spanish squadron under the overall command of Teniente generale (Lieutenant General) Luis de Córdova y Córdova bound for the English Channel to participate in an unsuccessful combined effort with a French Navy squadron to invade the British Isles in August 1779. After the expedition's failure, Nuestra Señora del Carmén was in port at Brest, France, with the rest of the squadron by December 1779. She got underway from Brest on 14 April 1780 to escort a convoy to Ferrol, which the convoy reached on 19 and 20 April. She then escorted several merchant ships from Ferrol to Cádiz.

Nuestra Señora del Carmén and the frigate Santa Perpetua captured the British Liverpool privateers Rockingham (of 24 guns) and Surprize (16 guns) off Cape Spartel at the western entrance to the Strait of Gibraltar on 17 June 1781.
During the Action of 6 September 1782 she was involved in the capture of H.M. Ordnance Storeship Calonne, a 26-gun frigate in the Strait of Gibraltar, and sent her as a prize to Cádiz under escort by the brig Caulicán.

Nuestra Señora del Carmén participated in the bombardment of Algiers of 4–8 August 1783 as part of a squadron under the overall command of Generale (General) Antonio Barceló. By 1786, she was assigned to the Ferrol department. In 1789 she was part of a squadron consisting of five ships of the line, five other frigates, and three brigantines. She was assigned to the Ferrol department again in 1790, and in early April 1790 departed Ferrol in company with the frigate Nuestra Señora del Pilar and the sloop-of-war Ventura to patrol the waters of the Azores. In May 1793 she captured the French brigantine Primavera in the Bay of Biscay.

In late September 1794, Nuestra Señora del Carmén set out from Ferrol for the Mediterranean, and later proceeded to Montevideo. She returned to Spain at Cádiz a became part of the squadron of Teniente generale (Lieutenant General) Jose de Mazarredo y Salazar.

In July 1795, Nuestra Señora del Carmén patrolled the waters of the Azores with the ship of the line Santo Domingo. She later made a voyage from Ferrol to Montevideo, which she reached on 20 November 1795 with the news that Spain had made peace with France in the War of the First Coalition, the first of the French Revolutionary Wars.

With the War of the Second Coalition raging, Nuestra Señora del Carmén departed Cádiz in May 1799 and joined Mazarredo's squadron — as well as the French squadron under Étienne Eustache Bruix — at Cartagena, Spain. The two squadrons sailed to Cádiz, and during the voyage Nuestra Señora del Carmén, supported by Vivo, captured the British hired armed cutter Penelope in the action of 7 July 1799. The two squadrons sailed from Cádiz on 12 July 1799 bound for Brest. While at Brest, Nuestra Señora del Carmén and Vivo sailed to Rochefort, France, carrying orders for Teniente generale (Lieutenant General) Francisco Javier de Melgarejo instructing him to bring his squadron to Brest. Accordingly, Melgarejo's squadron — with Nuestra Señora del Carmén in company — sailed from Rochefort, but as it approached Brest on 2 September 1799 it discovered that Brest was under a blockade by a British squadron of about 40 ships. Consequently, Melgarejo's squadron set course for Ferrol instead.

=== Capture ===
During March 1800 the Spanish authorities in Cádiz prepared a convoy made up of 13 merchant ships bound for ports in Spanish America — Lima in the Viceroyalty of Peru, Buenos Aires and Montevideo in the Viceroyalty of the River Plate, and Veracruz in the Viceroyalty of New Spain. Nuestra Señora del Carmén, under Capitán de fragata (Frigate Captain) Fraquin Porcel, and the 34-gun frigates Santa Florentina and Santa Sabina were assigned to escort the convoy, and all three of them had new copper sheathing on their hulls for the voyage. Each frigate also carried cargo for Lima, including quicksilver for use in the Peruvian silver mining industry. Nuestra Señora del Carmén's cargo consisted of 1,500 quintals of quicksilver, "sundries of Cards," and four 24-pounder (10.9 kg) field guns intended for use ashore, and Santa Florentina, commanded by Capitán de fragata (Frigate Captain) Manuel Norates, carried 1,500 quintals of mercury, sundry "Cards", and five 24-pounder (10.9 kg) field guns. All three frigates carried provisions for a four-month voyage. With the Archbishop of Buenos Aires, Pedro Ynsencio Bejarano, embarked as a passenger aboard Nuestra Señora del Carmén, the convoy sailed from Cádiz on 3 April 1800 bound for a stop in the Canary Islands

In April 1800, a British squadron under Rear-Admiral John Thomas Duckworth consisting of the 74-gun ships of the line HMS Leviathan and HMS Swiftsure, the 36-gun frigate HMS Emerald, and the fireship HMS Incendiary was on blockade duty off Cadiz. On 5 April the squadron sighted the Spanish convoy and gave chase, capturing Spanish merchant ships over the next two days. On 7 April, the British again sighted Nuestra Señora del Carmén and Santa Florentina, and eventually Leviathan and Emerald opened fire on their rigging to disable them; shortly afterward, both Spanish frigates surrendered. During the action, Nuestra Señora del Carmén's crew of 140 suffered 11 men killed and 16 wounded, while Santa Florentina's 114-man crew sustained casualties of 12 killed and 10 wounded, with Norates and her second captain among the wounded. The British reported no casualties.

When the action concluded, the British sailed for Gibraltar with their prizes. On arrival they encountered Incendiary, which had made port the previous day with two captured vessels of her own. In all, the British squadron captured nine merchant ships along with the two frigates between 5 and 7 April 1800.

== Royal Navy service ==
The Royal Navy took both captured frigates into service. Captain William Selby commissioned the former Nuestra Señora del Carmén as HMS Carmen in December 1800 for service on the Mediterranean Station. She then proceeded to capture a number of merchant vessels during 1801:

- On 3 April, the French brig Gentil Seconde, bound from Bayonne to Senegal laden with baled goods and wine.
- On 6 April, the Spanish schooner San Josef.
- On 23 May, the Spanish mistico Jean Baptiste, bound from Cádiz to Veracruz laden with baled goods, wine, and sundries "and since carried into Cádiz by the crew."
- On 28 May, the Spanish schooner Primivera y Concevida, bound from Magadore to Teneriffe (now Tenerife), laden with wool and sundries.
- On 21 June, a Spanish tartane of unknown name, bound from Algeciras to Málaga, Spain, in ballast.
- On 21 June, the Spanish polacre Nostra Senora de los Dolores, bound from Algeciras to Cartagena.
- On 21 June, the Spanish tartane Senora St. Anna, bound from Algeciras to Málaga with a cargo of coal.

On 22 July 1801, letters arrived at Plymouth, England, from Carmen, dated 4 June 1801. The letters reported that Carmen had captured four prizes, three of which arrived at Gibraltar, and that Carmen, the ships of the line HMS Superb and HMS Venerable, and the frigate HMS Cambrian had chased three French frigates into Cádiz Bay. Aboard the French frigates were two French contre-amiraux (counter admiral)s and seamen intended to crew 12 Spanish ships of the line readying for sea there. The Spanish squadron had been forced to delay its sailing because one of the storehouses full of naval stores in the dockyard had been destroyed by a fire. The four British vessels were waiting for the squadron of Rear-Admiral Sir James Saumarez's to arrive from Gibraltar to blockade the Spanish squadron.

Carmen and the brig HMS Morgiana arrived at Spithead in England on 9 November 1801 after a voyage from Egypt. On 2 December 1801, Carmen arrived at Portsmouth, England, where she was laid up.

== Disposal ==
The Principal Officers and Commissioners of His Majesty's Navy offered "El Carmen, 971 Tons, Copper-bottomed, lying at Portsmouth", for sale on 24 February 1802. She was sold there that month.

== Bibliography ==
- "No title given". Gaceta de Madrid (in Spanish). No. 51. Madrid. 17 December 1776. pp. 455–457.
- "Cádiz, 24 July 1781". Gaceta de Madrid (in Spanish). No. 62. Madrid. 3 August 1781. p. 623.
- "Cádiz,9 September 1782". Gaceta de Madrid (in Spanish). No. 75. Madrid. 17 September 1782. p. 772.
- Blanco Núñez, José María (2004). La Armada española en la segunda mitad del siglo XVIII [The Spanish Navy in the Second Half of the 18th Century] (in Spanish). IZAR, Construcciones Navales, S. A.
- Fernández Duro, Cesáreo (1973). La Armada Española, desde la unión de los reinos de Castilla y Aragón Tomo VIII [The Spanish Navy, from the Union of the Kingdoms of Castile and Aragon, Volume VIII] (in Spanish). Madrid: Museo Naval.
- González-Aller Hierro, José Ignacio (2004). La campaña de Trafalgar (1804-1805). Corpus Documental. 2 tomos [The Trafalgar Campaign (1804-1805): Documentary Corpus, 2 volumes] (in Spanish). Madrid: Ministry of Defense.
- Manera, Enrique (1999). El Buque en la Armada española [The Ship in the Spanish Navy] (in Spanish). Madrid: Editorial Sílex.
- Marshall, John (1823–1835). "Index" . Royal Naval Biography. London: Longman and Company.
- Montero y Aróstegui, José (1859). Historia y descripción de la ciudad y departamento naval del Ferrol [History and Description of the City and Naval Department of Ferrol] (in Spanish). Madrid: Imprenta de Beltrán y Viñas.
- Paula Pavía, Francisco de (1873). Galería biográfica de los Generales de Marina [Biographical gallery of Navy Generals] (in Spanish). Madrid.
- Rodríguez González, Agustín Ramón; Coello Lillo, José Luis (2003). La fragata en la Armada española. 500 años de historia [The Frigate in the Spanish Navy: 500 Years of History] (in Spanish). Madrid: IZAR Construcciones Navales, S.A.
- Winfield, Rif (2008). British Warships in the Age of Sail 1793–1817: Design, Construction, Careers and Fates. Seaforth Publishing. ISBN 978-1-86176-246-7.
- Winfield, Rif; Tredrea, John M.; García-Torralba Pérez, Enrique & Blasco Felip, Manuel (2023). Spanish Warships in the Age of Sail 1700—1860: Design, Construction, Careers and Fates. Seaforth Publishing. ISBN 978-1-5267-9078-1.
