= Assault on Cádiz (1797) =

1797 battle of the French Revolutionary Wars

Coordinates: 28°28′N 16°15′W

- Part of the French Revolutionary Wars
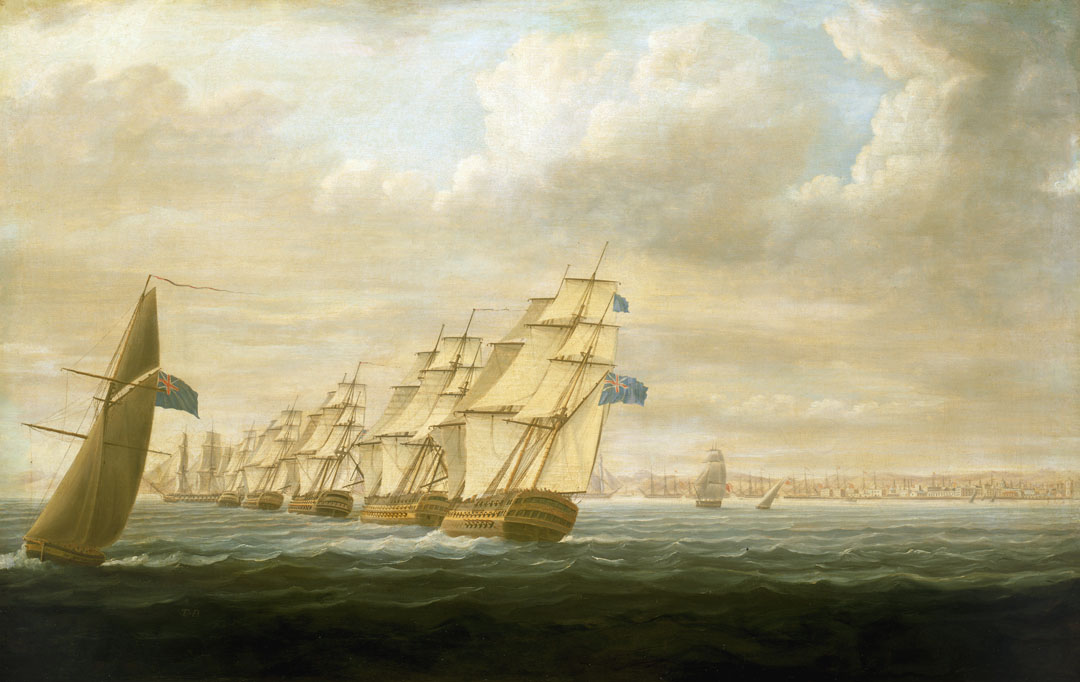
- Painting of the British blockade of Cádiz by Thomas Buttersworth
Date	June 1797
Location	Coast of Cádiz, Spain
Result	Spanish victory

Belligerents
Great Britain	Spain

Commanders and leaders
(Kingdom of Great Britain) Horatio Nelson (Kingdom of Great Britain) John Jervis	(Spain) José de Mazarredo (Spain) Federico Gravina

Casualties and losses
3 armed boats sunk Victory's launch driven ashore	3 armed boats captured

The assault on Cádiz was a part of a protracted naval blockade of the Spanish port of Cádiz by the Royal Navy, which comprised the siege and the shelling of the city as well as an amphibious assault on the port itself from June to July 1797. After the battle of Cape Saint Vincent the British fleet led by Lord Jervis and Sir Horatio Nelson had appeared in the Gulf of Cádiz. In the first days of June the city was bombarded, causing slight damage to the Spanish batteries, navy and city.

Nelson's objective was to force the Spanish admiral Jose Mazarredo to leave the harbour with the Spanish fleet. The Spanish response was to build gunboats and small ships termed fuerzas sutiles to protect the entrance of the harbour from the British. By early July, after a series of failed attacks led by Rear Admiral Nelson, and with the British ships taking heavy fire from the Spanish forts and batteries, they withdrew and the siege was lifted. The naval blockade, however, lasted until 1802.

== Background ==
In February 1797, the British routed a Spanish fleet near Cape St. Vincent but failed to strike a solid blow against the Spanish Navy in the uneven struggle. Admiral Sir John Jervis sailed for Lisbon after the engagement, frustrated at the escape of several valuable prizes including Santísima Trinidad. New orders from the Admiralty demanded him to blockade and subdue the Spanish port of Cádiz, where much of the battered Spanish fleet had sought shelter. The First Sea Lord had ordered the assault as he believed that Jervis' victory over José de Córdoba y Ramos guaranteed a successful attack on that strategic harbour.

== Blockade begins ==
The blockade of Cádiz, which had been begun by Jervis in 1797, had no intermission from that time until the peace of Amiens, and on the renewal of the war it was recommenced with all its former rigour. The fleet was distant from the town about 25 kilometres (15 miles); the Spanish fleet within the harbour, and the British in-shore squadron under the command of Rear Admiral Thomas Louis, closely watching their movements, and reporting every indication of their disposition to come to sea. Two frigates were at the mouth of the harbour, for the purpose of intercepting any supply of provisions for the enemy. Nelson said he knew no more certain means of bringing them out than starvation.

Having completed these arrangements, the admiral retired with the body of the fleet to the neighbourhood of Cape St. Mary's between 80 and 100 kilometres (50 and 60 miles) west of Cádiz, establishing a line of communication between himself and his advanced squadron, by means of three or four intermediate ships. By keeping at this distance from Cádiz, Nelson prevented the enemy from acquiring any accurate knowledge of his force.

== Battle ==
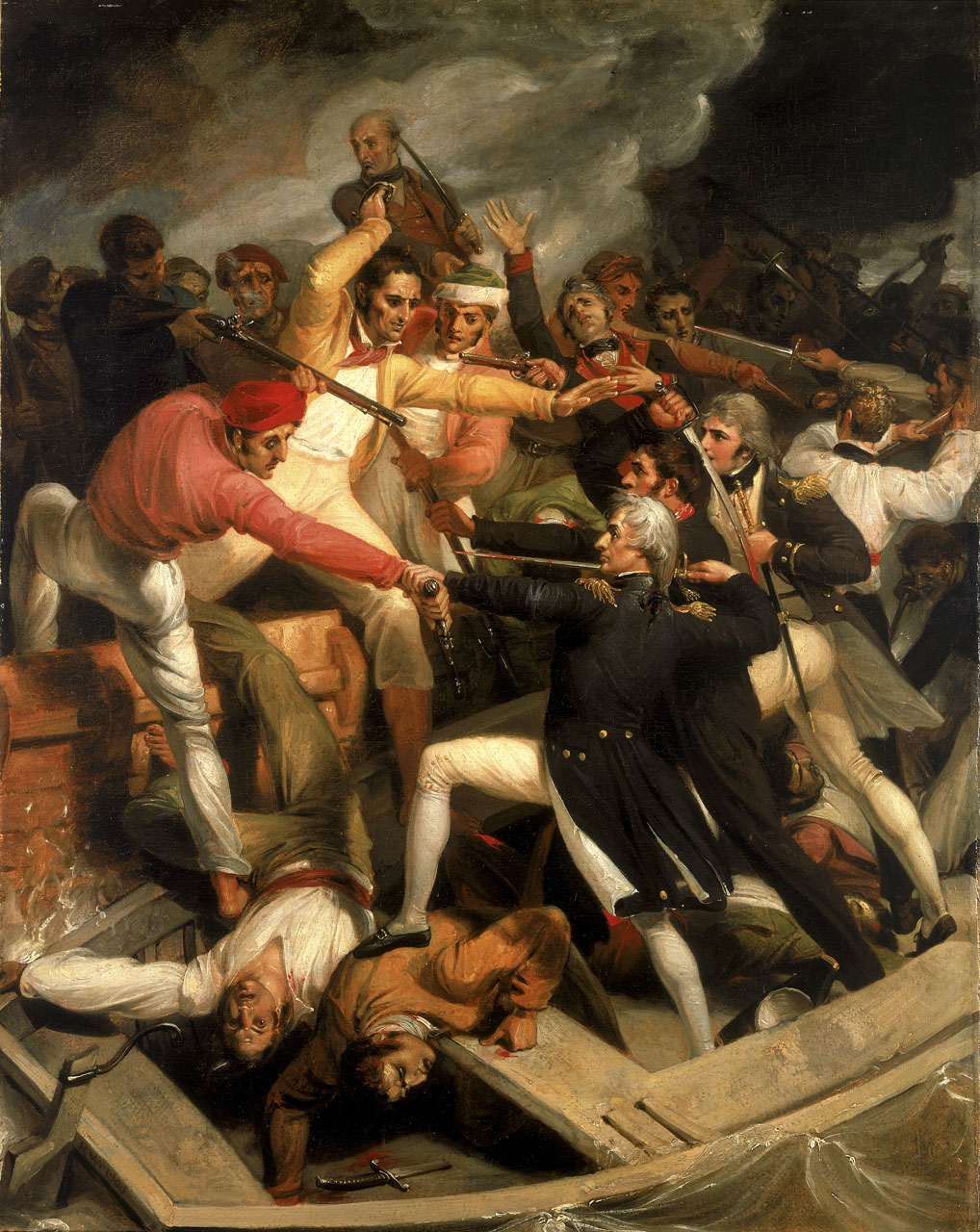
Nelson in conflict with a Spanish launch, 3 July 1797 (Richard Westall, 1806)

Nelson was appointed to the command of the inshore squadron blockading Cádiz. An order from Sir John Jervis directed the launches and barges of two divisions of the fleet to assemble on board HMS Theseus, between 9 and 10 o'clock every night, armed with carronades, spikes, cutlasses, broad axes, and chopping knives, a lamp in each boat with spikes, a sledge-hammer, and a coil of small rope, to tow off any armed brig, mortar or gun-boat, that should be carrier, and to follow the directions of Nelson for the night.

The Spaniards had equipped a number of gun-boats and large launches, in which they rowed guard during the night, to prevent the near approach of the blockaders. On these a vigorous attack was made in the night of 3 July by the British boats, headed by Nelson himself, which pursued the Spaniards close to the walls of Cádiz, and took two mortar-boats and an armed launch. In this conflict it was the admiral's fortune to encounter the barge of Don Miguel Tregoyen, the commander of the Spanish gun-boats. The struggle that ensued was one of the most perilous in which Nelson had ever been engaged. He fought hand to hand with the Spanish commandant, and it was his own opinion that he must have lost his life but for the devoted attachment of his faithful coxswain, John Sykes.

The Spanish garrison of Cádiz at this time consisted of more than 4,000 men. On the line wall facing the bay were mounted 70 pieces of cannon and eight mortars; near the Alameda were four other mortars; and from the Capuchins, at the back of the city, to the land point were three batteries of four guns each. Such was the strength of the place when Nelson was ordered to bombard it. The first attempt proved ineffective, as the large mortar had been materially damaged in earlier service. The second produced considerable effect in the town and among the shipping, as ten sail of the line, among them the ships carrying the flags of admirals Mazarredo and Gravina, warped out of the range of the shells with much precipitation on the following morning.

On the night of 8 July, Nelson meditated another operation under his own immediate direction; but the wind blew so strong down the bay, that it was found impossible to bring up the bomb vessels to the point of attack in time. On the following day, he informed Earl St. Vincent that, though he hoped enough had been done to force out the Spanish fleet, yet in case there had not, he would try them again.

The continuation of the blockade for most of the following three years, greatly curtailed the operations of the Spanish fleet from Cádiz until the Peace of Amiens in 1802, allowing the Royal Navy to establish its dominance in the Mediterranean.

== Aftermath ==
Nelson had some time before he proposed to the commander-in-chief an expedition against the town of Santa Cruz, in the island of Tenerife. Lord Jervis allowed Sir Horatio to select such ships and officers as he thought proper for this service. The expedition resulted in another defeat for him. The citizens of Cádiz composed a song about the failed assault:

¿De qué sirve a los ingleses
tener fragatas ligeras
si saben que Mazarredo
tiene lanchas cañoneras?

What good is it to the English
to have light frigates
if they know that Mazarredo
has gunboats?

== Bibliography ==
- Gardiner, Robert (2001). Fleet Battle and Blockade, The French Revolutionary Wars. Chatham Publishing. ISBN 1-84067-363-X.
- Knight, R.J.B. (2005). The Pursuit of Victory: The Life and Achievement of Horatio Nelson. Basic Books, New York. ISBN 978-0-465-03764-3.
- San Juan, Víctor (2005). Trafalgar: Tres armadas en combate. Silex Ediciones. ISBN 84-7737-121-0.
- Barker Henry, Matthew (1836). The life of Nelson revised and illustrated, by the Old Sailor. General Books, London. ISBN 1-4589-2623-0.
- Fernández Duro, Cesáreo (1902). Armada española desde la unión de los reinos de Castilla y de León, Vol. VI. Sucesores de Rivadeneyra, Madrid. (in Spanish)
- O'Flanagan, Patrick (2008). Port cities of Atlantic Iberia, c. 1500-1900. Aldershot: Ashgate Publishing, Ltd. ISBN 978-0-7546-6109-2.
- Pelham Brenton, Edward (1837). The naval History of Great Britain, from the Year MDCCLXXXIII to MDCCCXXXVI Vol II. London.
- Fisher, John Robert (1997). The economic aspects of Spanish imperialism in America, 1492-1810. Liverpool: Liverpool University Press. ISBN 0-85323-552-X.
