= Hired armed cutter Constitution =

History

Great Britain
- Name: Constitution
- Namesake: Constitution
- Commissioned: 6 November 1796
- Fate: Captured 9 January 1801

General characteristics
- Type: Cutter
- Tons burthen: 12161/94 (bm)
- Propulsion: Sails
- Sail plan: Cutter or schooner
- Armament: 12 × 4-pounder guns

History

United Kingdom
- Name: Constitution
- Commissioned: 4 May 1804
- Fate: Sunk 26 August 1804

General characteristics
- Type: Cutter
- Tons burthen: 12034/94 (bm)
- Propulsion: Sails
- Sail plan: Cutter or schooner
- Armament: 10 × 12-pounder carronades

Two vessels have borne the designation, His Majesty's hired armed cutter Constitution. The first served the British Royal Navy during the French Revolutionary Wars. The second served briefly at the start of the Napoleonic Wars and was sunk in 1804. The two cutters are similar enough that may have been the same vessel; at this juncture it is impossible to know.

== The first hired armed cutter Constitution ==
This vessel served on a contract from 6 November 1796 to 7 November 1801. She was of 12161/94 tons (bm) and carried twelve 4-pounder guns.

On 7 November 1798, Constitution, under the command of Lieutenant John Whiston, was among the vessels that participated in the capture of Minorca. Commodore Duckworth, the naval commander, mentioned Whiston's services in the letter Duckworth wrote on the campaign. She also shared in the prize money for the capture.

Constitution detained Zum Gutten Ensbrick, Wevers, master, which had been sailing from Rotterdam to St. Andero. The prize arrived at Plymouth on 24 April 1799.

When Unicorn captured the French brig St Antoine, on 9 June 1799, Constitution, was entitled to share in the proceeds.

On 31 August, the Danish ship Denmark, Kaften, master, arrived at Plymouth. She had been on a voyage from Havana to Hamburg with a cargo of sugar, coffee, indigo, and cotton, supposedly Spanish property, when Constitution detained her.

Constitution and the hired armed cutter Penelope shared in the proceeds of the capture of the Danish brig Neptunus.

Two French privateers, each of 14 guns, captured Constitution on 9 January 1801 off the Isle of Portland. Constitution, and her crew of some 40 men was under the command of Lieutenant W.H. Faulknor. After an engagement that left Constitution's rigging cut to pieces, the French boarded and captured her. Constitution suffered eight men killed or wounded; French casualties were 26 men killed or wounded. (One French vessel had a crew of 95 men and the other 85.) Although the French took Constitution's crew on board their two vessels, they left Faulknor aboard her. That same evening Harpy and the revenue cutter Greyhound recaptured Constitution. The subsequent court martial of Faulknor for the loss honourably acquitted him.

== The second hired armed cutter Constitution ==
This vessel served on a contract from 4 May 1804 to 26 August 1804, when she was sunk off Boulogne. She was of 12034/94 tons (bm) and carried ten 12-pounder carronades.

On 26 August 1804, Constitution was under the command of Lieutenant James Samuel Aked Dennis. Her master was Mr. Mowle.

Immortalite, Harpy, Adder, and Constitution attacked a French flotilla of 60 brigs and luggers off Cape Gris Nez. The British vessels were within range of shore batteries that fired on them.

Constitution was chasing a gun-brig, of 12 guns, and two lugger-rigged yachts, painted with white bottoms and green sides, and richly gilt, supposedly carrying some important officers. When Constitution got close enough to fire grapeshot from her carronades, the luggers lowered their sails and masts, and their crews rowed as fast as possible for the shore.

As Constitution pursued the luggers, a 13" shell fell into Constitution, falling through the deck and hull without exploding. Water started coming in faster than the pumps could handle and her crew abandoned her; the other vessels in the squadron rescued them.

A shell hit Harpy, also without exploding. It killed a seaman as it hit, and the crew speculated that his blood had extinguished the fuse. Another account had the shell breaking a beam, which tore out the fuse. When the shell came to rest, a seaman picked it up and plunged it into a bucket. Some shots hit Immortalite, wounding four men. The British succeeded in driving some vessels ashore, but the great bulk of the flotilla reached Boulogne. The British squadron engaged in some small skirmishes over the next two days, but without notable results.
