= Frederick Maitland (Royal Navy officer, born 1777) =

Royal Navy officer (1777–1839

Rear-Admiral Sir Frederick Maitland KCB
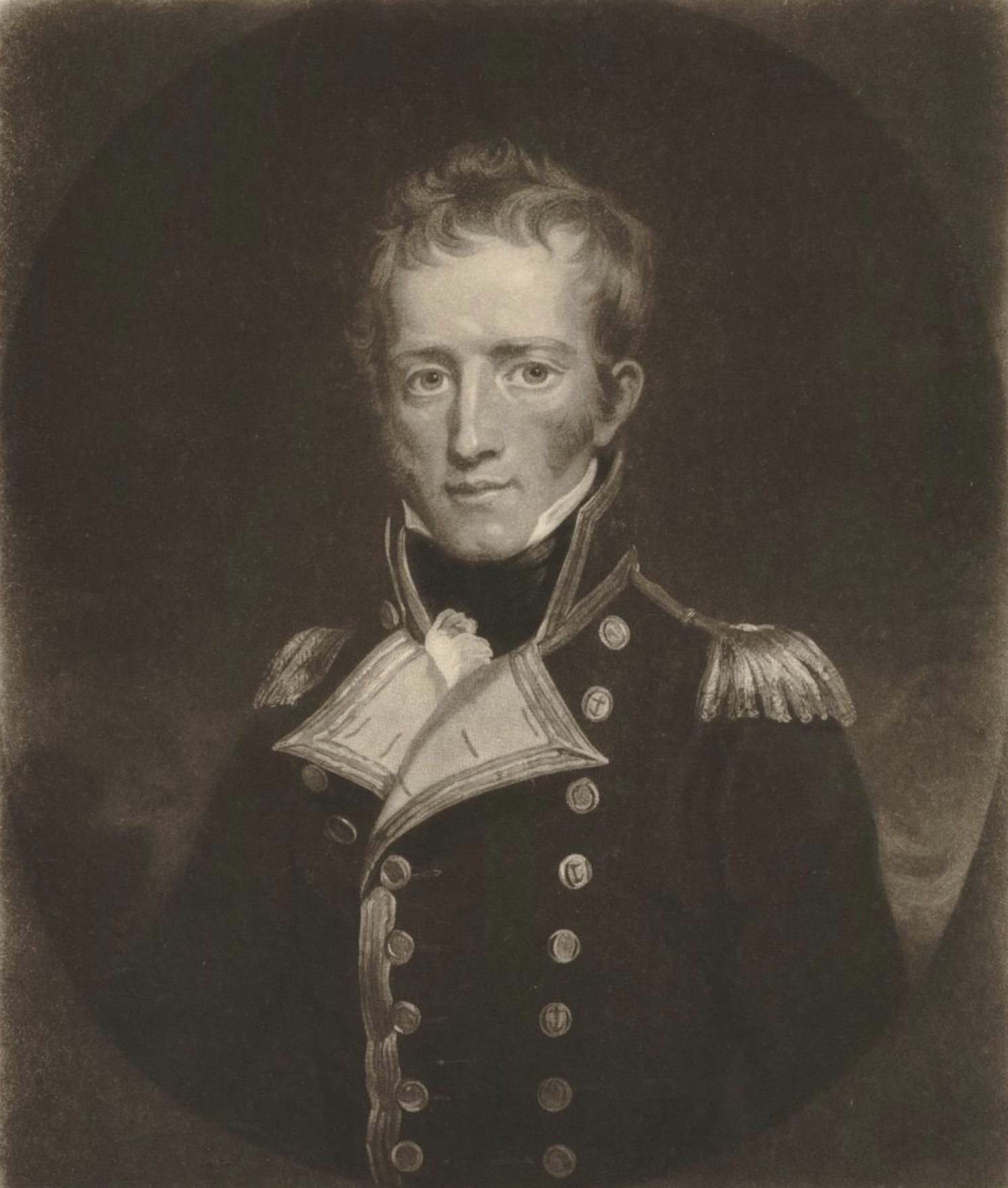
- Engraving by Henry Hoppner Meyer after a Samuel Woodforde portrait, 1816
- Born: 7 September 1777; Rankeilour, Fife
- Died: 30 November 1839 (aged 62); Aboard HMS Wellesley, off Bombay
- Relatives: Frederick Lewis Maitland (father)
- Military career
- Allegiance: Great Britain; United Kingdom
- Branch: Royal Navy
- Service years: 1785–1839
- Rank: Rear-Admiral of the Red
- Commands: HM hired cutter Penelope; HMS Cameleon; HMS Dragon; HMS Carrere; HMS Loire; HMS Emerald; HMS Goliath; HMS Boyne; HMS Bellerophon; HMS Vengeur; HMS Genoa; HMS Wellesley; East Indies and China Station
- Conflicts: French Revolutionary Wars; Glorious First of June; French invasion of Egypt and Syria; Battle of Alexandria (1801); Napoleonic Wars; Battle of the Basque Roads
- Awards: CB; KCB

Rear-Admiral Sir Frederick Lewis Maitland, KCB (7 September 1777 – 30 November 1839) was a Royal Navy officer who served in the French Revolutionary and Napoleonic Wars. He rose to the rank of rear-admiral of the red and held a number of commands. The most famous event of his career occurred when Napoleon surrendered to him aboard HMS Bellerophon, marking the end of the Napoleonic Wars.

== Family and early life ==
Maitland was born at Rankeilour, Fife, on 7 September 1777, as the third son of Frederick Lewis Maitland (1730–1786), himself a distinguished naval officer. Several other members of Maitland's family were serving officers in the army, including his uncle, General Sir Alexander Maitland, 1st Baronet and his cousin, General Frederick Maitland (1763–1848). Having received an education at the Royal High School, Edinburgh, Maitland followed his father into the Navy in 1785 at the age of eight, spending his first years aboard the sloop HMS Martin, under Captain George Duff, followed by a period aboard the frigate HMS Southampton with Robert Forbes. Whilst aboard Southampton, Maitland was present at the Glorious First of June in 1794.

== Promotion to lieutenant ==
Maitland was promoted to lieutenant on 3 April 1795 and appointed to HMS Andromeda. He soon moved to HMS Venerable, which was then in the North Sea, serving as the flagship of Admiral Adam Duncan. Maitland then moved to the Mediterranean in April 1797, joining the fleet under John Jervis, Lord St Vincent. Jervis appointed him to the sloop HMS Kingfisher. Maitland was part of several successful cruises, and assisted in the capturing of several privateers. He quickly became noted for his courage, and the ships' company subscribed £50 to present him with a sword. He did not spend long with Kingfisher though, as she was wrecked on 3 December 1798 as she was leaving the Tagus. Maitland had been in temporary command at the time, and received the customary court-martial. He was honourably acquitted and appointed to serve at Gibraltar as flag lieutenant to Lord St Vincent.

== A spell in captivity and first commands ==
The combined fleets of France and Spain were retiring from the Mediterranean by mid-1799, and on 7 July St Vincent ordered Maitland to go aboard the hired armed cutter Penelope with orders for her to carry out reconnaissance on the enemy fleets, as St Vincent put it, "to go, count and dodge them". When Maitland arrived however, he found out that Penelope's lieutenant was sick and unable to take command. Maitland took over instead and attempted to follow his orders. He was apparently hampered by the cowardice and disobedience of the crew of the cutter, and the next day the Spanish captured Penelope and brought her into Cádiz as a prize. There Maitland met Lieutenant-general Jose de Mazarredo y Salazar. Mazarredo discovered that Maitland was Lord St Vincent's flag lieutenant. Being under an obligation to St Vincent, Mazarredo set Maitland free and returned him to Gibraltar without requesting an exchange.

On his return, St Vincent promoted Maitland to commander and gave him the sloop HMS Cameleon, with the promotion being backdated to 14 June. Maitland commanded her off the coast of Egypt, under Sir Sidney Smith until the signing of the Convention of El Arish on 24 January 1800. Maitland was sent home overland with dispatches, but quickly returned to his command. He spent the rest of 1800 aboard the Cameleon, before Lord Keith moved him to the command of the storeship HMS Wassenar. The Wassenar was at that time moored at Malta, and had been deemed unfit for service. Maitland was given permission instead to accompany the expedition to Egypt. He was appointed to command the boats that were covering the landings and acquitted himself well. He then moved to support the army's right flank during operations on 13 March, and at the Battle of Alexandria on 21 March 1801. His service was specially acknowledged by the commanders-in-chief, and he was mentioned in Sidney Smith's report. These actions caused him to be rewarded with a promotion to post rank, dated to 21 March. He temporarily took command of the 74-gun HMS Dragon, but had moved to command HMS Carrere in August. He returned with her to England, and she was paid off in October 1802.

== Further action ==
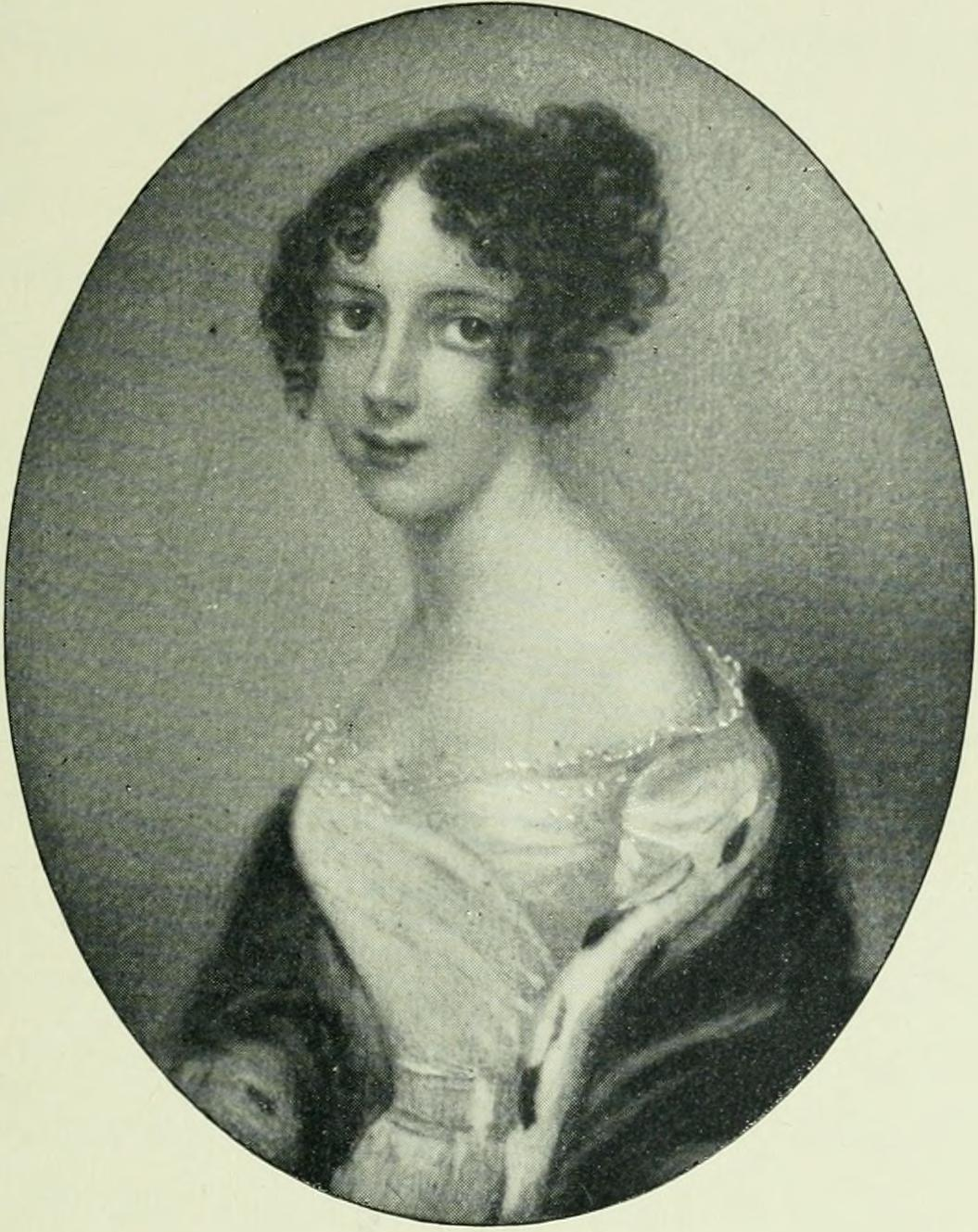
Maitland's wife, Catherine

Maitland married Catherine, the second daughter of Daniel Connor of Ballybricken, County Limerick, Ireland, in April 1804. They had only one child, which died in infancy. By this time Maitland's patron St Vincent had been made first lord of the Admiralty. With the outbreak of war he appointed Maitland to the 38-gun HMS Loire, which Maitland sailed off the west coast of France and the north coast of Spain. Maitland spent three years with the Loire, during which time he captured or destroyed a number of privateers and coastal batteries. He was involved in a particularly notable action on 4 June 1805 in Muros Bay, south of Cape Finisterre, for which he received the thanks of the City of London, the freedom of Cork, and a sword from the Patriotic Fund. He also took part in the capture of the French frigate Libre on 24 December 1805. His next command was the 36-gun HMS Emerald, which he took up in November 1806. The service was the same as the Loire's, and Maitland continued his successes aboard her. He was at the Battle of the Basque Roads in April 1809, but due to the confusion Emerald was one of the ships that were not sent in until 12 April.

== Aboard Bellerophon ==
Maitland was given command of the 58-gun HMS Goliath between 1813 and 1814, and was sent aboard her to the Halifax and West Indian stations. He was appointed to the 98-gun HMS Boyne in November 1814 and ordered to sail to North America. Maitland spent the early part of 1815 gathering a fleet of transports and merchants in Cork harbour in preparation for crossing the Atlantic, but found himself unable to set sail due to a succession of strong westerly winds. Before he could sail, news reached England of Napoleon's escape from Elba and his return as Emperor of the French. Maitland's orders were immediately countermanded, and he was moved to the 74-gun HMS Bellerophon. He sailed aboard her from Plymouth on 24 May, under the orders of Sir Henry Hotham.

Bellerophon was stationed off Rochefort in the Bay of Biscay, watching the French warships in the harbour. Whilst Bellerophon was off Rochefort, Napoleon was defeated at the Battle of Waterloo. News of this reached Maitland on 28 June, followed by a letter from Bordeaux that warned him that Napoleon was planning an escape to America from the French Atlantic coast, probably from Bordeaux. Maitland believed that Rochefort was the more likely point of escape, but took the precaution of sending two smaller craft to cover other ports, one to Bordeaux, and another to Arcachon. He kept Bellerophon herself off Rochefort. Hotham was aboard HMS Superb covering Quiberon Bay, whilst a string of British frigates, corvettes, and brigs were watching all along the coast. Hotham told Maitland that should he intercept Bonaparte, he was to take the former emperor to England.

== Maitland and Napoleon ==
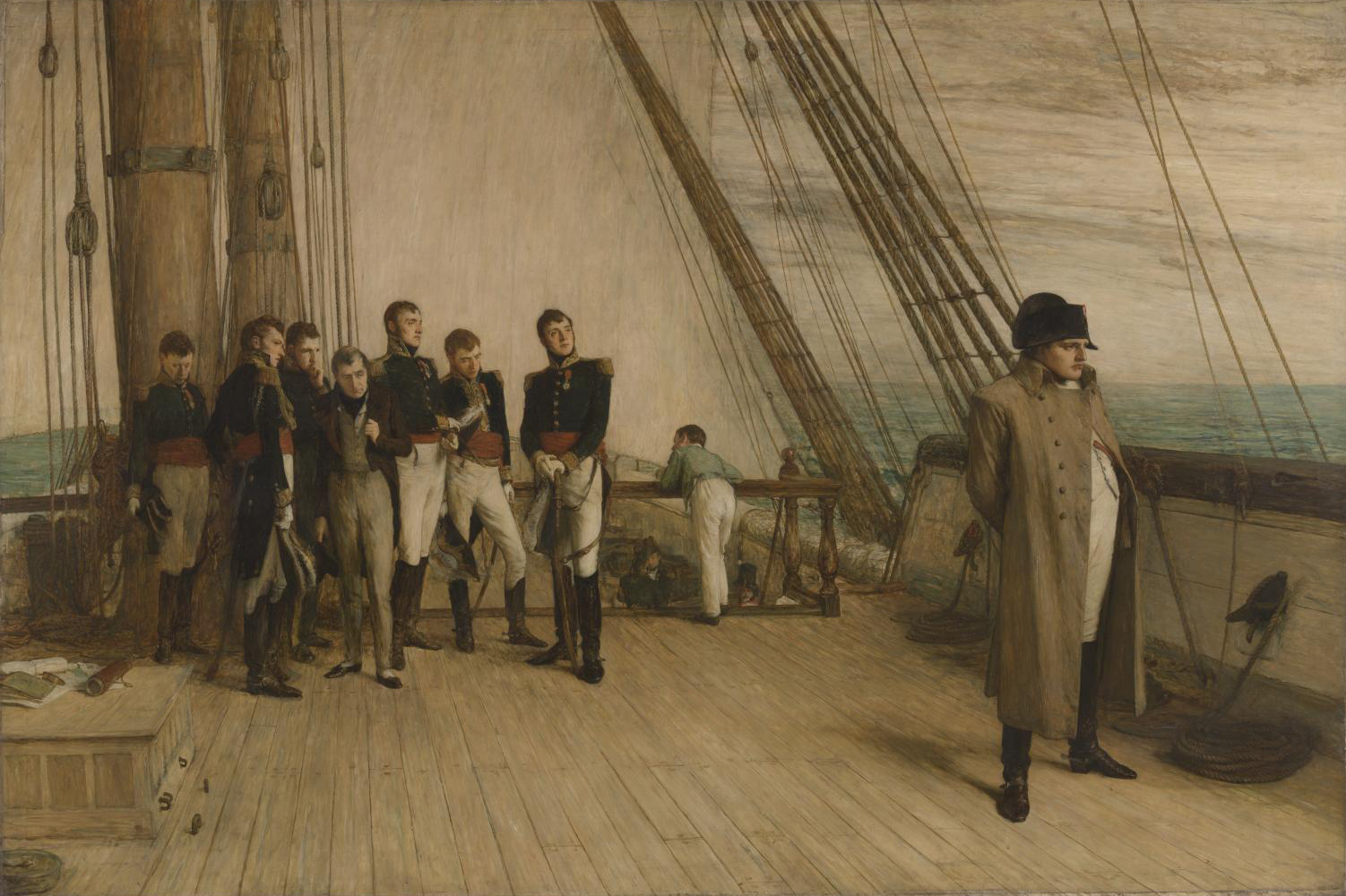
Napoleon on Board the Bellerophon by William Quiller Orchardson, 1880

Maitland's instincts proved correct, and Napoleon arrived at Rochefort in early July. By this time, Napoleon was in an untenable position. Napoleon could no longer remain in France without risking arrest; indeed, Prussian troops had orders to capture him dead or alive. However, the Bellerophon and the rest of Hotham's fleet were blocking every port. Therefore, Napoleon authorized the opening of negotiations with Maitland. The negotiations opened on 10 July. Maitland refused to allow Napoleon to sail for America, but offered to take him to England instead. The negotiations went on for four days, but eventually Napoleon acquiesced. He surrendered to Maitland on 15 July and embarked on the Bellerophon with his staff and servants.

Maitland placed his cabin at the former emperor's disposal and sailed the Bellerophon to England. She reached Torbay on 24 July, then was ordered to Plymouth, whilst a decision was made by the government over Bonaparte's fate. She sailed again on 4 August and whilst off Berry Head on 7 August, Napoleon and his staff were removed to HMS Northumberland, which conveyed him to his final exile on Saint Helena. Maitland later wrote a detailed narrative of Bonaparte's time on the Bellerophon, which he subsequently published in 1826.

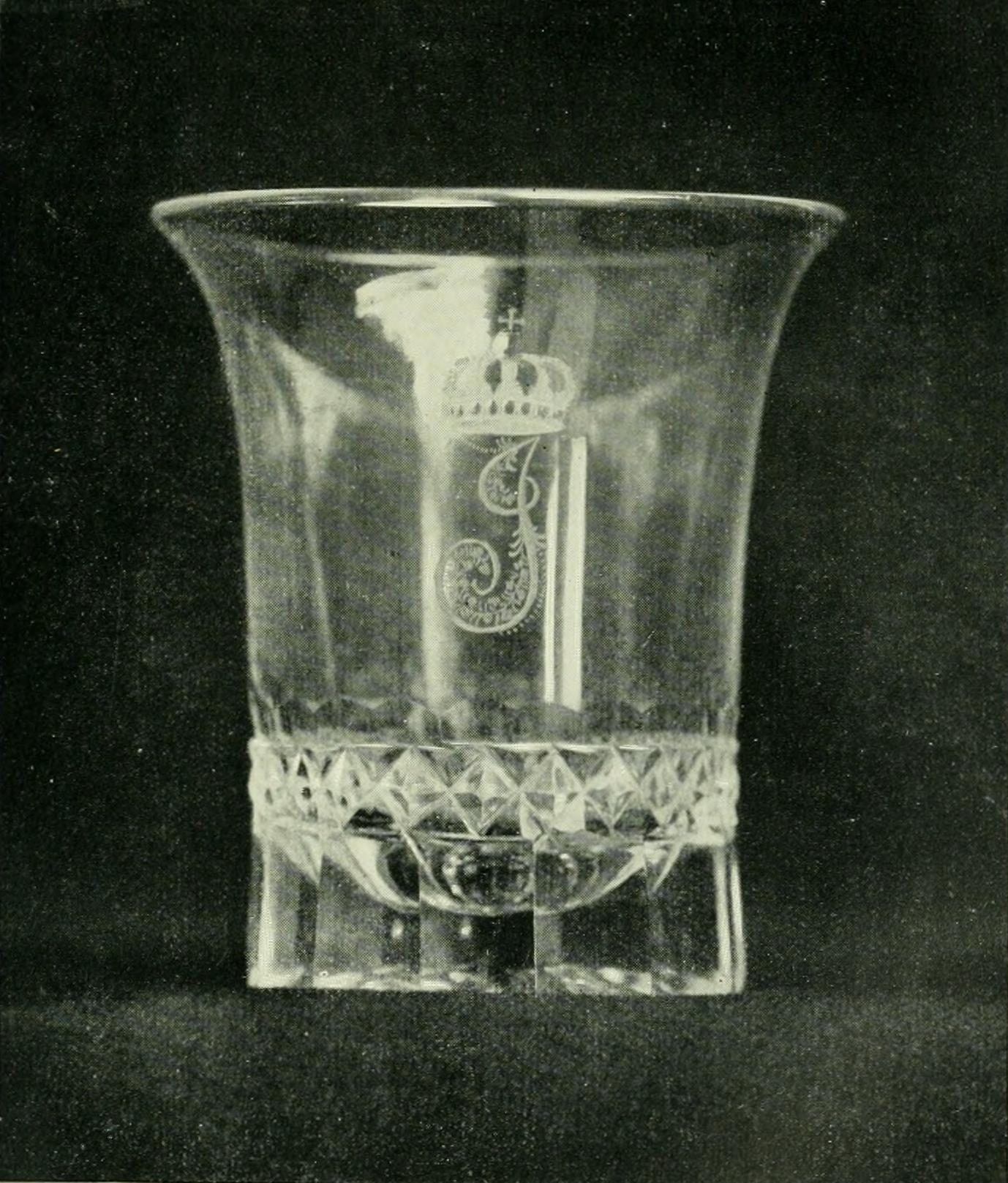
Tumbler given to Maitland by Napoleon

== Royal duties and rise to rear admiral ==
Maitland took command of the 74-gun HMS Vengeur in October 1818, and in 1819 sailed her to South America. He took Lord George Beresford from Rio de Janeiro to Lisbon in 1820, and then returned to the Mediterranean. He then carried Ferdinand I, king of the Two Sicilies from Naples to Livorno. The passage was rough and lasted seven days, but they arrived safely on 20 December. As a token of gratitude the king invested Maitland with the insignia of a knight commander of the Order of St Ferdinand and Merit, and presented him with his portrait, set with diamonds, in a gold box. Maitland then returned to England, and was appointed to command the 74-gun HMS Genoa, the guardship at Portsmouth. He spent three years aboard her, leaving her in August 1823. He commanded HMS Wellesley in the Mediterranean between 1827 and 1830, and was promoted to Rear-Admiral of the Blue on 22 July 1830, and Rear Admiral of the Red on 10 January 1837. He had been appointed a Companion of the Order of the Bath (CB) on the restructuring of the Order in 1815, and on 17 November 1830 he was advanced to Knight Commander (KCB). He was appointed a Deputy Lieutenant of the County of Fife on 5 March 1831.

== Indian service ==
He was admiral superintendent of the dockyard at Portsmouth between 1832 and 1837. He was appointed commander-in-chief in the East Indies and China Station in July 1837, and raised his flag in the Wellesley again. He co-operated with the army during its advance from Bombay towards Afghanistan in February 1839, and captured the town and fort of Karachi, going on to oversee the landing of troops and supplies. News then reached him of disturbances at Bushehr, so he set off to investigate. He landed Marines and evacuated the resident and his staff, without punishing the rioters. The Anglo-Indian press subsequently criticised this action as being injudiciously lenient.

== Death ==
Maitland died on 30 November 1839 whilst at sea on board the Wellesley, off Bombay. He was buried at Bombay. A monument was later erected by subscription to his memory in St. Thomas Cathedral. His wife, Lady Maitland, died in 1865 at Lindores, Fife.

== Notes ==
Military offices
| Preceded by Sir Thomas Capel | Commander-in-Chief, East Indies and China Station; 1837–1840 | Succeeded by Sir Gordon Bremer |
