= José de Mazarredo y Salazar =

Spanish Navy officer (1745–1812)

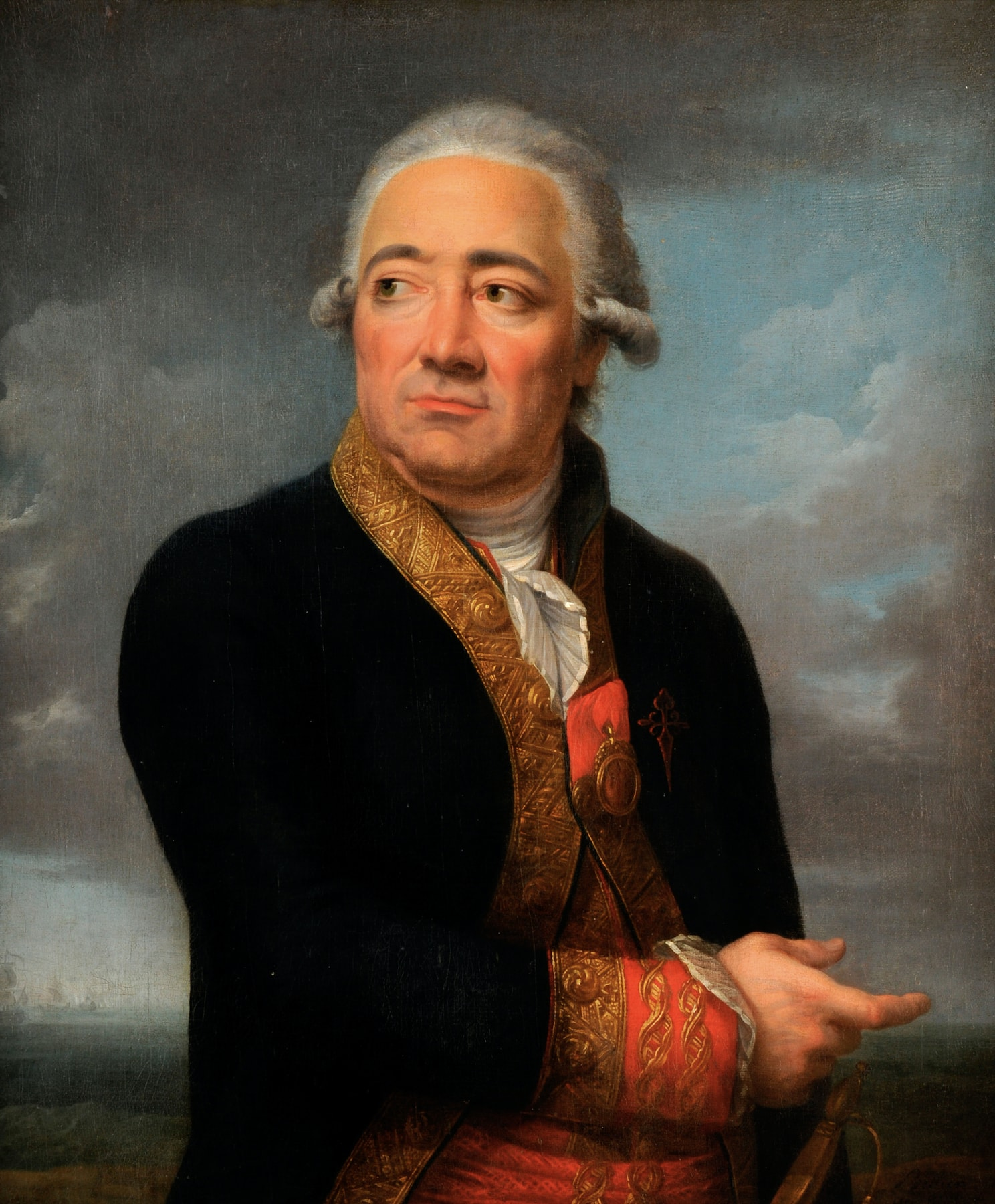
- Portrait of Mazarredo by Jean François-Marie Bellier
- Born: March 8, 1745; Bilbao, Spain
- Died: July 29, 1812 (aged 67); Madrid, Spain
- Military career
- Allegiance: Spain
- Branch: Spanish Navy
- Service years: 1771–1805
- Rank: Lieutenant general
- Nickname: El Bilbaíno
- Conflicts: American Revolutionary War; Armada of 1779; Action of 9 August 1780; Battle of Cape Spartel; French Revolutionary Wars; Siege of Roses (1794–1795); Assault on Cádiz (1797); Action of 7 July 1799; Napoleonic Wars

Lieutenant-General José de Mazarredo Salazar de Muñatones y Gortázar (8 March 1745 – 29 July 1812) was a Spanish Navy officer, cartographer, diplomat and astronomer who served in the American Revolutionary War and French Revolutionary and Napoleonic Wars. A professor of naval tactics, he was considered to be one of the best Spanish naval commanders of the period.

== Early career ==
His inclination toward the sea began at a young age; at 14 he enlisted himself aboard the sloop Andaluz. After 12 years of service in the Spanish navy, he was promoted to assistant of the maritime department of Cartagena. In 1772 Mazarredo went to the Philippines aboard the Frigate Venus. In 1774 he was transferred to the frigate Rosalía and took part in a hydrographic campaign in South America.

In 1775 he took part of the Spanish attack on Algiers. The decisions on navigation, anchorage and disembarkation of the twenty thousand men of the Spanish army were made by him. Shortly after, Mazarredo developed a tabular system for the use by the Spanish Navy. In 1778, as commander of the ship of the line San Juan Bautista, he completed hydrographic surveys in the Iberian Peninsula, contributing to the creation of a Maritime Atlas.

== Tactics ==
Mazarredo was an original theorist. The Spanish Navy entered the American Revolutionary War with a system of tactics devised by him, Teniente de navío de la Real Armada, and expounded in Rudimentos de Táctica Naval para Instrucción de los Officiales Subalternos de Marina, printed at Madrid in 1776, dedicated to King Charles III. Despite bearing some evidence of the influence of Paul Hoste and Sébastien Morogues, it was a text book for junior officers, though it could clearly have been read with profit by all alike. In common with the French writers, Mazarredo said very little about fighting the enemy. Broadly speaking, his tone was sophisticated and undogmatic.

Mazarredo did introduce a new variation of a sea-warfare idea; the use of fire ships by the windward fleet, if threatened with doubling as a means of covering its retreat to windward. [He] also showed himself an innovator in his treatment of breaking the enemy line. He proposed that, when the fleet was to windward, the centre should break through the enemy centre. In the process of breaking through, the enemy's centre ships immediately astern of the break would be forced away to leeward, so disorganising the enemy rear and isolating it. Meanwhile, the enemy van would have no choice but to stand on to avoid being put between two fires, and it would thus become completely separated from the remainder of the fleet.

Exactly the same movement might be executed from leeward, though in that case the enemy's rear would be forced to give way to windward, thus exposing itself to the fire of the centre and rear ships of the attacking fleet. Mazarredo also drew up a signal book, specifically for Córdova's fleet, which was printed in 1781. It was used in the operations against Minorca and Gibraltar, and it does not seem unreasonable that Córdova's signalling system was somewhat similar when he first joined comte d'Orvilliers in 1778. Mazarredo's signal book of 1781 is an improvement on Chevalier du Pavillon's. Like the latter, it employed a tabular system, but much less complex. It employed tables 20 by 20, each permitting 400 signals.

This signal book was prepared for Franco-Spanish cooperation, as it begins with special signals for indicating Spanish and French squadrons, divisions, frigates, the reserve corps, etc. The 400 signals for use at anchor covered not only every feature of fleet administration, as in the manner of Morogues, but also shore bombardments and landings. Twenty special signals allowed for reporting the movements of ships, to be made by privateers. The signals for use under sail by day, made with a combination of 'cornets', which were swallow-tail flags, other flags, and flags from the table, included a series of battle signals. No-one studying this book could criticise the Spanish either for a lack of useful signals for battle and general purposes, or for over elaboration of signalling technique. Although still tied to the tabular system, their arrangement was brilliantly simple compared with that of the French.

== American Revolutionary War ==
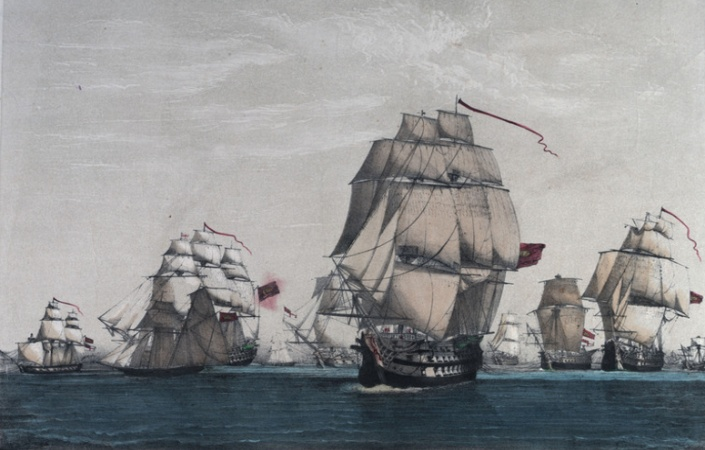
Spanish warships towing British prizes after the action of 9 August 1780

Mazarredo achieved his greatest military success as Cordova's chief of staff. Thanks to his proposal of a bold manoeuvre, which his colleagues considered reckless, Cordova's fleet of 31 ships of the line and six frigates overcame a British convoy of 63 merchant ships escorted by a ship of the line and two frigates in the action of 9 August 1780. The fleet captured 55 British merchant ships, including five East Indiamen. Among the cargo captured were 80,000 muskets, numerous artillery pieces, 300 barrels of gunpowder, more than £1,000,000 in gold and silver, equivalent to £155,000,000 in 2025, and uniforms for more than a dozen regiments. Moreover, 3,000 soldiers and sailors were also captured. Two years later he took part in the indecisive Battle of Cape Spartel. At the end of the American Revolutionary War he was sent to Algiers as ambassador, in order to negotiate peace after the Spanish bombardments of Algiers.

== French Revolutionary Wars ==
In 1793 Mazarredo received the military Order of Santiago. During the French Revolutionary Wars Mazarredo's fleet from Cádiz joined Lángara's Squadron in the Mediterranean. During those months Mazarredo, who had relieved Lángara carried out several operations in the Mediterranean Sea, one of which was the evacuation of soldiers and civilians from Roses, that was being besieged by the French.

Shortly after, Mazarredo had written to warn Godoy of the dangers of a Spanish naval decline, accusing the government of bad administration. This cost him his rank, being dismissed and sent to Ferrol weeks later. But after the Spanish defeat at the Battle of Cape St Vincent in 1797, the admiralty requested his reinstatement. Mazarredo then took command at Cádiz where a British fleet, led by Lord Jervis and Sir Horatio Nelson, appeared on 5 July and proceeded to blockade and bombard the city. But Mazarredo had already organised its defences for such an attack. The Spanish garrison and naval forces put up such a spirited resistance that the British fleet failed to produce any significant losses to the Spanish and went away two days later.

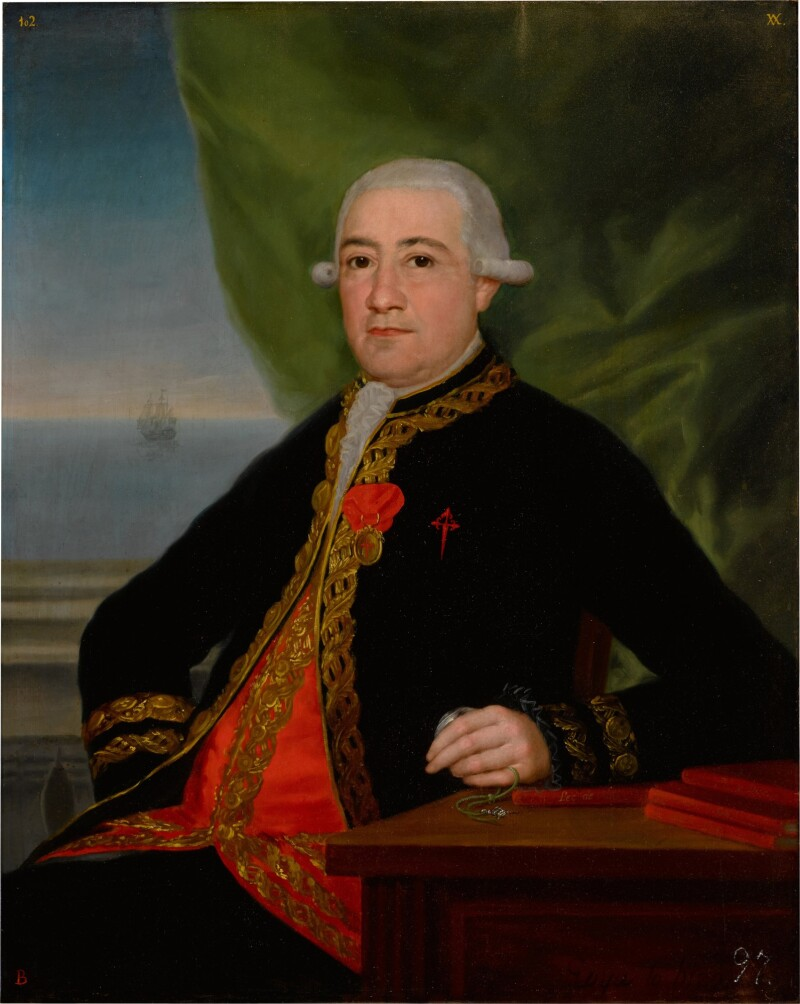
c. 1785 portrait of Mazarredo by Francisco Goya

In 1799 Mazarredo left Cádiz and sailed to Cartegena. Among the news that Napoleon learned that the French Atlantic Squadron, commanded by Admiral Étienne Eustache Bruix, had entered the Mediterranean and was at Toulon, Bonaparte learned that a Spanish squadron under Mazarredo had left Cádiz and was at Cartagena. This last bit of news, which presaged a joint Franco-Spanish action in the Mediterranean, should perhaps have induced Bonaparte to remain in Egypt in order to await its issue. Bruix instructions were to co-operate with the Spanish fleet supplying beleaguered Malta and Corfu and then to bring supplies and several thousand reinforcements to Alexandria.

On 21 June 1799, after Bruix helped to evacuate the French from various Italian ports, he joined Mazarredo at Cartagena. The combined Franco-Spanish fleet comprised forty-two battleships. Since the sixty British ships of the line in the Mediterranean were scattered among several squadrons, Bruix had a unique opportunity to expel the British from that sea and take his fleet to Egypt. Mazarredo refused to co-operate with the French in any enterprise save the reconquest of Minorca from Britain. On 30 March the Franco-Spanish fleet sailed from Cartagena to Cádiz. In June 1799, the French and Spanish fleets under Mazarredo and Bruix, amounting to forty sail of the line, and upwards of thirty frigates and smaller vessels, formed a junction at Cartagena, and on 7 July 1799 after an order sent by him, the chasing ships of his Spanish squadron captured the 18-gun British hired armed cutter Penelope, commanded by Lieutenant Frederick Lewis Maitland. After this short action, he proceed from Cádiz to Brest without opposition.

== Later years ==
In 1804 he was sent as ambassador from Spain to France having previously given up the command of the Squadron at Brest to Don Federico Gravina in 1801. His frank bearing and firmness of character were little agreeable to the First consul, who required more flexibility in the agents employed by other powers, with greater deference to his own views and pretensions. It was imperative upon the Spanish court to conciliate the rising power of Napoleon, and Mazarredo soon heard of his recall. Mazarredo had greatly displeased Napoleon by his outspokenness and lack of flexibility, thus he was dismissed to soothe the angry Napoleon, and the subordination of Spanish interest to those of France was complete.

Mazarredo called Napoleon's plans "imperialistic and despotic".

Despite his open criticism of the naval systems at the end of his career, Mazarredo had a well-rounded record of sea time, ship command, commander-in-chief of the corps of marines, and responsible posts as aide to senior Spanish commanders at sea. He conducted several comparative sea trials to perfect ship-handling methods and ships' signalling routines in the San Ildefonso-class.
