= Étienne Eustache Bruix =

French Navy officer and politician

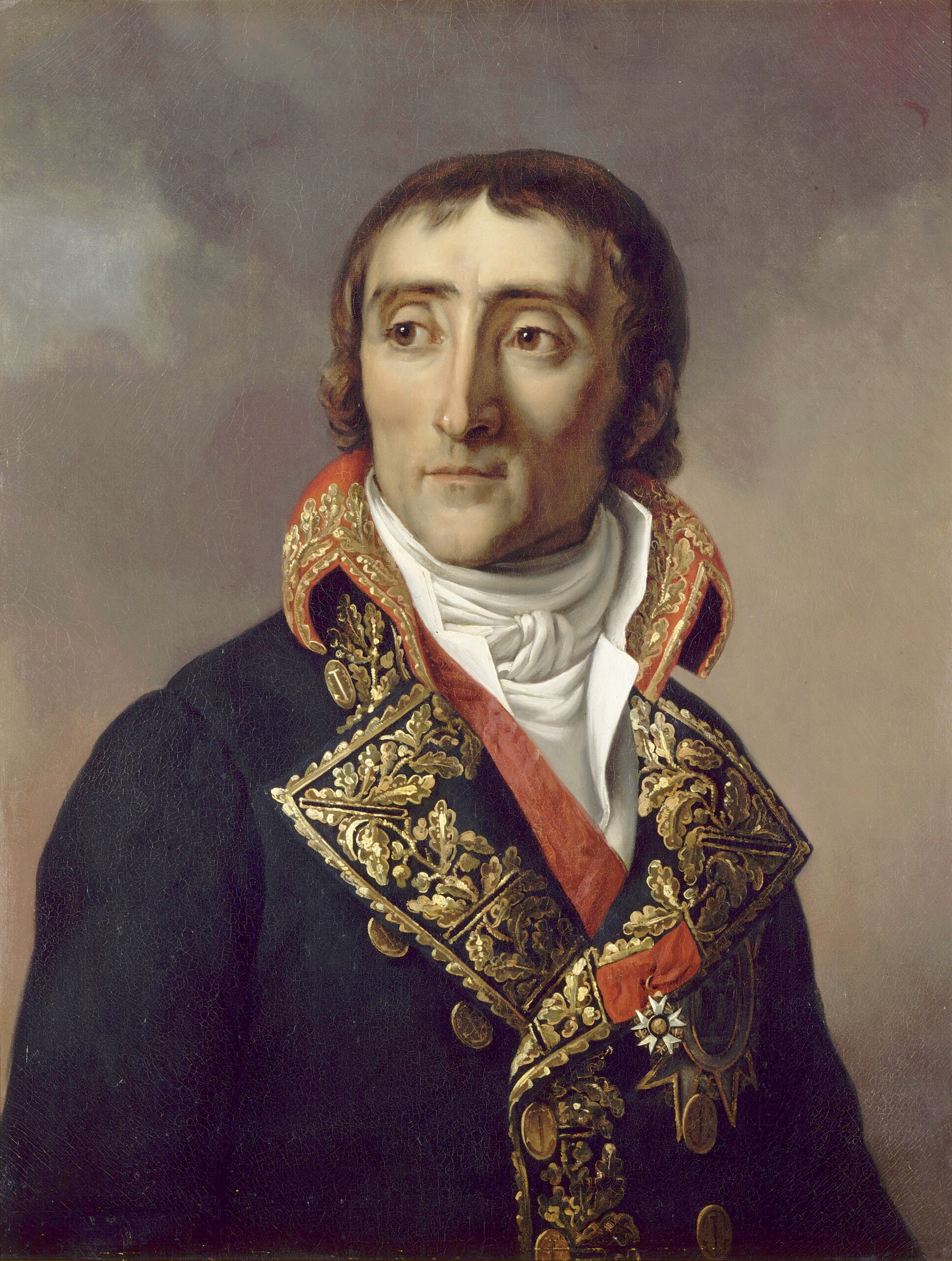
- Portrait by Jean-Baptiste Paulin Guérin, 1837
- Born: 17 July 1759; Fort-Dauphin, Saint-Domingue
- Died: 18 March 1805 (aged 45) Paris, France
- Allegiance: Kingdom of France; French First Republic; First French Empire
- Branch: French Navy; French Imperial Navy
- Service years: 1778–1805
- Rank: Admiral
- Commands: Pivert; Indomptable; Éole
- Conflicts: American Revolutionary War; Battle of Fort Royal; Invasion of Tobago; Battle of the Chesapeake; Battle of Saint Kitts; Battle of the Saintes; French Revolutionary Wars; French expedition to Ireland (1796); Croisière de Bruix; Napoleonic Wars; Napoleon's planned invasion of the United Kingdom

Admiral Étienne Eustache Bruix (English: /bruːˈiː/ broo-EE, French: [etjɛn ystaʃ bʁɥi]; 17 July 1759 – 18 March 1805) was a French Navy officer and politician who served as Minister of the Navy and the Colonies from 1798 to 1799.

== Early life ==
Étienne Eustache Bruix was born on 17 July 1759 in Fort-Dauphin in the French colony of Saint-Domingue into a family from Béarn. He began his career at sea onboard a slave ship captained Jean-François Landolphe. In 1778, Bruix joined the French Navy as a Garde-Marine. He served on the frigates Fox and Concorde, taking part in the Battle of Fort Royal on 29 April 1781, the invasion of Tobago between May and June, the Battle of the Chesapeake on 5 September, the Battle of Saint Kitts on 25 January 1782 and the Battle of the Saintes on 12 April 1782. He was promoted to ship-of-the-line ensign in November 1781. Bruix was given command of Pivert and tasked with surveying Saint-Domingue's coasts and harbours. He was aided in the task by Louis Pierre de Chastenet de Puységur. Bruix was promoted to ship-of-the-line lieutenant in May 1786.

== French Revolutionary Wars ==
Bruix was elected member of the Académie de Marine in 1791, and promoted to ship-of-the-line captain on 1 January 1793 and given command of Indomptable. However, he was dismissed from the service in October 1794. Retiring to the outskirts of Brest, he wrote a memorandum titled Means of provisioning the navy solely with products from French territory. This advocacy of naval autarky as a way to defeat British blockades attracted notice, and Minister of the Navy and the Colonies Laurent Jean François Truguet recalled Bruix in 1795 to appoint him to the command of Éole. He held this command up to the moment he was sent to join Vice-admiral Louis Thomas Villaret de Joyeuse's squadron as a chief of staff.

Bruix commanded a squadron in the fleet of Vice-admiral Justin Bonaventure Morard de Galles during the failed French expedition to Ireland in 1796. This brought to Bruix to the attention of Lazare Hoche, who promoted him to counter admiral in May 1797. Bruix was appointed Minister of the Navy and the Colonies on 27 April 1798 and held the office until 4 March 1799. He was promoted to vice admiral on 13 March 1799 and during this period also became commander of the Atlantic Squadron in Brest. In early 1799, the French Directory ordered Bruix to sail the Atlantic Squadron into the Mediterranean to end British naval dominance there and relieve the trapped Army of the Orient in Egypt. Favourable winds and fog allowed him to evade British blockaders and Bruix sailed southwards with 25 ships of the line.

Off Cádiz, Bruix encountered a blockading British fleet of 15 ships of the line under Lord Keith. Despite his numerical superiority and the 28 Spanish ships of the line in Cádiz, Bruix refused to attack Keith's fleet and continued into the Mediterranean. Having made a detour to Toulon for repairs, Bruix received orders to assist the besieged French garrison in Genoa. He rerouted his fleet to the Gulf of Genoa to resupply the garrison but was driven back by poor weather. In the meantime, Keith had followed him into the Mediterranean and gathered together the scattered British squadrons in the area at Minorca. Bruix abandoned his venture, eluded the Royal Navy and returned to the Atlantic, where he joined forces with a Spanish Navy squadron before returning to Brest. Following the expedition, which became known as the Croisière de Bruix, he took command of a fleet at the Île-d'Aix which was intended to sail to Spain. However, the British reinforced their blockade, Bruix fell ill and the Peace of Amiens between France and Britain in 1802 prevented the fleet from leaving port.

== Later life and death ==
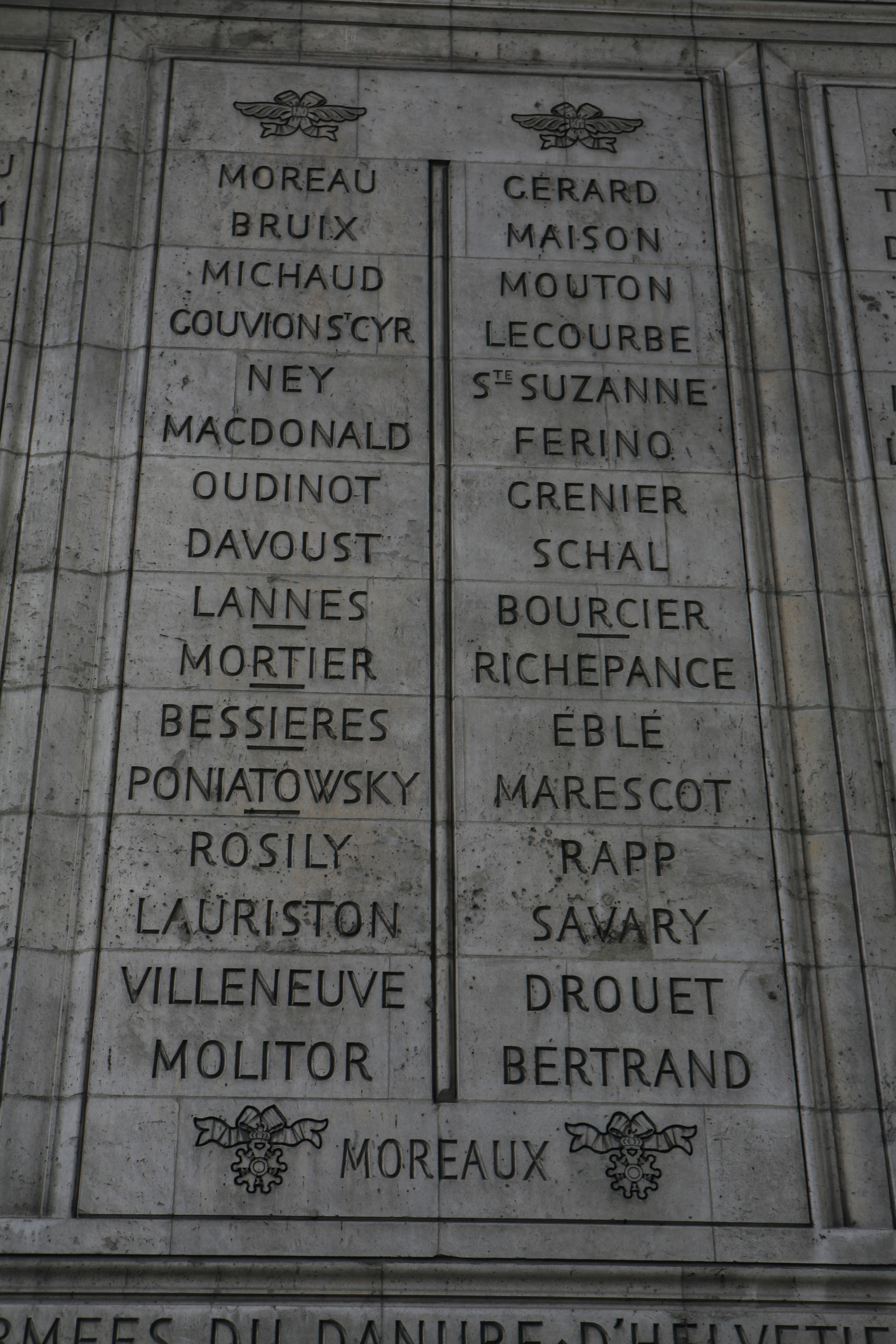
Bruix's name on the Arc de Triomphe

Bruix was privy to the Coup of 18 Brumaire on 9 November 1799, which brought Napoleon to power as First Consul. In 1801 Napoleon promoted Bruix to admiral and appointed him as a councillor of state the following year. In March 1803 the Napoleonic Wars broke out and Bruix was subsequently placed in command of the invasion flotilla assembled at the Camp of Boulogne as part of Napoleon's planned invasion of the United Kingdom. In July 1804 Bruix refused to obey orders from Napoleon to take the flotilla out of harbour for a review due to a developing storm. A furious Napoleon reprimanded Bruix and came close to striking him; one of Bruix's subordinates carried out the order but at the cost of 200 lives. Following this incident Bruix fell ill with tuberculosis and returned to Paris, where he died at the age of 45.

== Legacy ==
Boulevard de l'Amiral-Bruix in Paris is named in his honour.

== Citations ==
Political offices
Preceded by Georges René Le Peley de Pléville	Minister of the Navy and the Colonies; 27 April 1798– 4 March 1799	Succeeded by Charles Maurice de Talleyrand-Périgord
