= Amazon-class frigate (1795) =

Frigate class of the Royal Navy

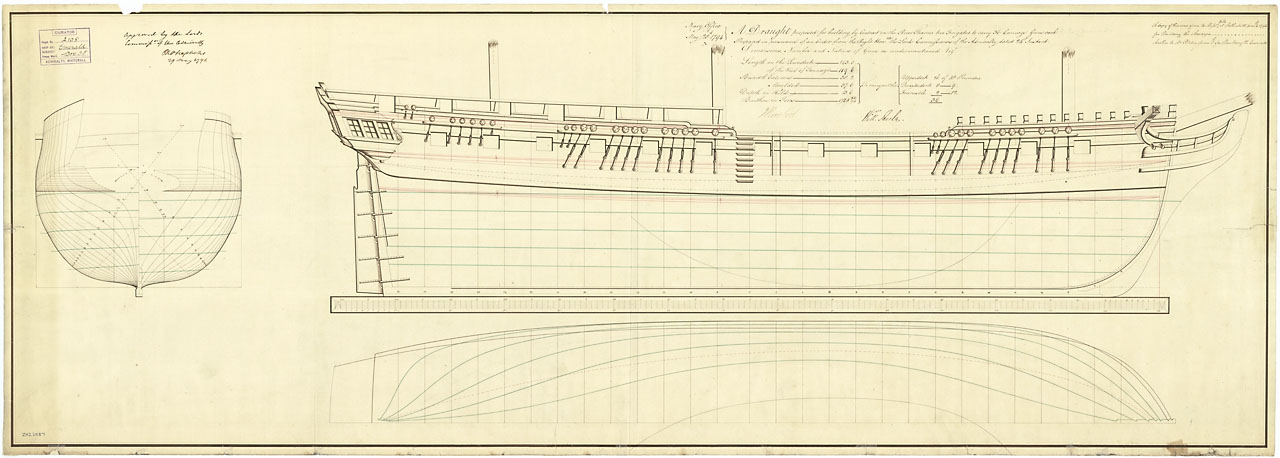
- Original profile plan of Emerald and her sister ship, Amazon, the first pair of the 1795 Amazon class.

Class overview
- Name: Amazon class of 1795
- Operators: Royal Navy

General characteristics
- Type: Fifth-rate frigate
- Tons burthen: 925 87/94 (bm)
- Length: 143 ft (43.6 m) (gundeck); 119 ft 6 in (36.4 m) (keel)
- Beam: 38 ft 2 in (11.6 m)
- Depth of hold: 13 ft 6 in (4 m)
- Sail plan: Full-rigged ship
- Complement: 264
- Armament: Gundeck: 26 × 18-pounder guns; QD: 8 × 9-pounder (later 12-pounder) guns + 6 × 32-pounder carronades; Fc: 2 × 9-pounder (later 12-pounder) guns + 2 × 32-pounder carronades

The Amazon-class frigates of 1795 were a set of four 36-gun sailing frigates built for the Royal Navy and designed by William Rule. The first pair were constructed from oak and launched in July 1795. A second pair had already been ordered in January that year, to be made from pitch pine, one launched in February and the other in March 1796. All four of the new class carried a main battery of twenty-six 18-pounder (8.2 kg) long guns supplemented with eight 32-pounder (15 kg) carronades and ten long guns, 9-pounder (4.1 kg) for the first pair, 12-pounder (5.4 kg) for the second batch, on the upperworks.

They served during the French Revolutionary and Napoleonic Wars although the first of the class, HMS Amazon, only lasted until 1796, wrecked following an action on 13 January with a French ship-of-the-line. HMS Emerald on the other hand was not broken up until 1836. Her long and eventful career included a part in the 1804 invasions of St Lucia and Surinam. The two fir-built frigates; HMS Trent and Glenmore remained in use until 1823 and 1814 respectively, although both ended up on harbour duty, as receiving ships.

All of the class saw action, capturing and destroying enemy ships. Notable engagements include Emerald’s chase of a Spanish convoy in the action of 7 April 1800, Trent’s cutting out of a Spanish ship and schooner off Puerto Rico in 1799 and Glenmore’s capture of the East Indiaman Calcutta in the same year.

== Design, construction and armament ==
The Amazon-class frigates of 1795 were a set of four 36-gun sailing frigates built for the Royal Navy and designed by William Rule. Frigates of the period were three-masted, full-rigged ships that carried their main battery on a single, continuous gun deck. They were smaller and faster than ships of the line and primarily intended for raiding, reconnaissance and messaging. Since late 1778, those of 36 or 38 guns with a main armament of 18-pounder (8.2 kg) long guns, had become the standard in the Royal Navy and by 1793, when the French Revolutionary War began, it was not unusual for them to be close to 1000 tons burthen (bm).

Rule's original Amazon class were 32-gun, 12-pounder, frigates of 677 tons builder's old measurement (bm), built between 1771 and 1782. In need of a larger frigate, in 1794, the Admiralty asked for a 36-gun, 18-pounder version. The new class of ship was to be 143 ft (44 m) along the gundeck, 119 ft 6 in (36 m) at the keel, with a beam of 38 ft 2 in (12 m) and a depth in hold of 13 ft 6 in (4 m); making it 925 87/94 bm. The main battery comprised twenty-six 18-pounder (8.2-kilogram) long guns on the gundeck with a secondary armament on the upperworks which included ten smaller calibre guns; eight on the quarterdeck and two on the forecastle. These were 9 pounders (4.1 kilograms) for the first pair of Amazon's but Trent and Glenmore were given 12 pounders (5.4 kilograms) instead. The new vessels would also have eight 32-pounder (14.5-kilogram) carronade; two on the forecastle and six on the quarterdeck. (Note: The gun-rating of a vessel was the number of long guns it was designed to carry and did not always match its actual armament. Before 1817, carronades were not counted at all unless they were direct replacements for long guns.) Carronades were lighter so could be manoeuvred with fewer men, and had a faster rate of fire but had a much shorter range than the long gun. The new frigates would have a complement of 264 when fully manned.

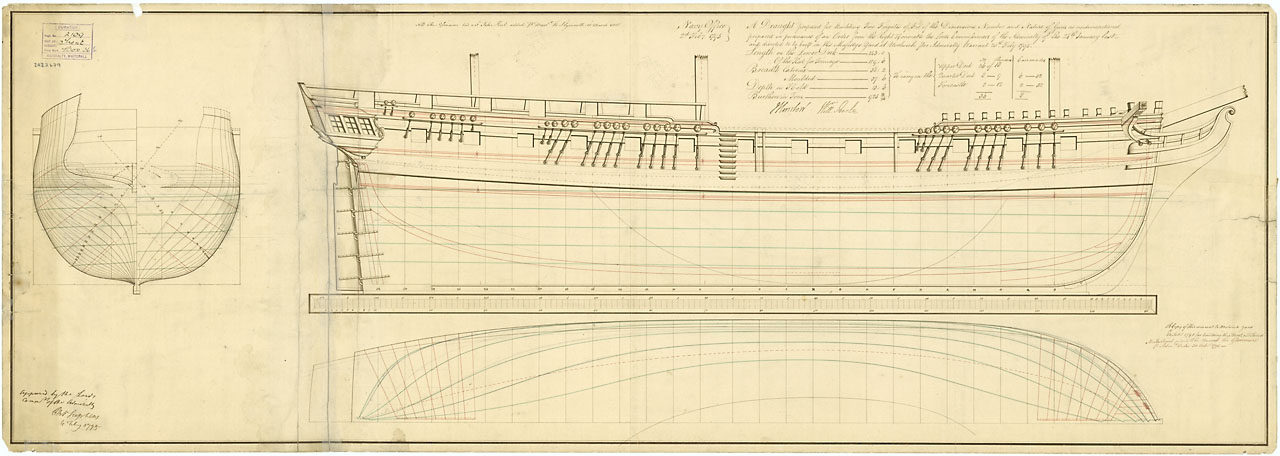
Profile plan for Trent and her sister ship Glenmore

The first two, HMS Amazon and Emerald were ordered on 24 May 1794, and were to be built of oak. The second pair, HMS Trent and Glenmore were ordered on 24 January 1795 but these were to be constructed of pitch pine. The shortage of timber, and in particular oak, was a constant problem for the Royal Navy in the 18th and 19th centuries. Softwoods were easier to work and did not require as much seasoning so fir-built frigates could be produced quicker. They were not as strong however, and did not last as long as their oak-built counterparts. Being lighter, they floated higher in the water, unless additional ballast was added, and this made them faster, although with a tendency to fall to leeward. The Trent and Glenmore were identical in design to the hardwood ships except for the stern which was built with a square tuck. (Note: The tuck was the return beneath the stern gallery.)

Originally intended as a series of four, by the time the first of the 1795 class had been launched on 4 July, Rule had already drawn up plans for HMS Naiad, an expanded version which was larger at 1,013 tons (bm), had a complement of 284 men and carried 38 guns.

== Ships of the class ==
Ships of the 1795 class and HMS Naiad for comparison
	HMS Amazon	HMS Emerald	HMS Trent	HMS Glenmore	HMS Naiad
Ordered	24 May 1794	24 May 1794	24 January 1795	24 January 1795	30 April 1795
Laid down	June 1794	June 1794	March 1795	March 1795	September 1795
Launched	4 July 1795	31 July 1795	24 February 1796	24 March 1796	27 February 1797
Length (gundeck)	143 ft 2 1/2 in (43.6 m)	143 ft 2 1/2 in (43.6 m)	143 ft 0 in (43.6 m)	143 ft 0 in (43.6 m)	147 ft 0 in (44.8 m)
Length (keel)	119 ft 5 1/2 in (36.4 m)	119 ft 5 1/2 in (36.4 m)	119 ft 6 in (36.4 m)	119 ft 6 in (36.4 m)	122 ft 6 1/4 in (37.3 m)
Beam	38 ft 4 in (11.7 m)	38 ft 4 in (11.7 m)	38 ft 2 in (11.6 m)	38 ft 2 in (11.6 m)	39 ft 6 1/2 in (12.1 m)
Depth in hold	13 ft 6 in (4 m)	13 ft 6 in (4 m)	13 ft 6 in (4 m)	13 ft 6 in (4 m)	13 ft 9 in (4.2 m)
Tons burthen (BM)	933 87/94	933 87/94	925 87/94	925 87/94	1,018 91/94

== In service ==
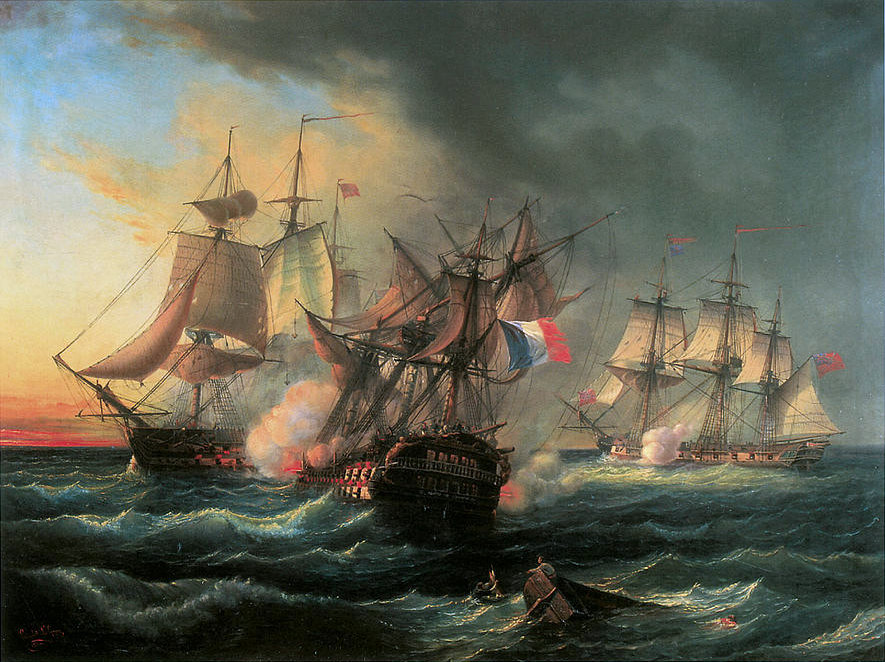
Amazon (far right) and Indefatigable, engage the French ship-of-the-line, Droits de l'Homme

=== HMS Amazon ===
Amazon had a short but eventful career during the French Revolutionary War, which she spent in the Channel and Western Approaches, part of a frigate squadron under Sir Edward Pellew. She was actively involved in the capture of seven enemy brigs, two chasse-marees, two corvettes the 32-gun frigate, Unité and the 40-gun Virginie, before she was wrecked following an engagement with a French ship-of-the-line.

The 74-gun French ship Droits de l'Homme, was returning from the failed expedition to Ireland, and in the ensuing action of 13 January 1797, Amazon, in company with Pellew's ship Indefatigable, encountered her off the coast of Brittany. Pellew was 7 nmi (13 km) ahead of Amazon when he first attacked the Droits de l'Homme. An hour-and-a-half later Amazon came up and poured a broadside into the Frenchman's quarter. The two frigates attacked her from either side. When land was suddenly sighted at 04:00 on 14 January, the frigates broke off their attack and headed in opposite directions. Amazon, going north, and more severely damaged, was unable to wear and ran aground at Audierne Bay, Isle Bas. Three crew had been killed during the battle and six more drowned, but the rest were able to reach shore. There the French captured them. The heavy seas pounding her on the beach destroyed Amazon; the Droits de l'Homme, badly damaged in the battle, was also wrecked, with heavy casualties.

=== HMS Emerald ===
First commissioned for Admiral John Jervis's fleet in the Mediterranean. In 1797, Emerald was one of several vessels sent to hunt down and capture the Spanish flagship Santisima Trinidad, which had escaped from the British at the Battle of Cape St Vincent. A four-decker, carrying 130 guns, the Santisima Trinidad was the world's largest warship of the time. Crippled during the battle, she had been towed to safety. Emerald was supposed to have been present at the Battle of the Nile but in May 1798 a storm separated her from Horatio Nelson's squadron and she arrived in Aboukir Bay nine days too late. She was part of Rear-Admiral John Thomas Duckworth's squadron during the action of 7 April 1800 off Cádiz. Emerald served in the Caribbean throughout 1803 in Admiral Samuel Hood's fleet, then took part in the invasion of St Lucia in July, and of Surinam the following spring. Returning to home waters for repairs in 1806, she served in the Western Approaches before joining a fleet under Admiral James Gambier in 1809, and taking part in the Battle of the Basque Roads. In November 1811 she sailed to Portsmouth where she was laid up in ordinary. Fitted out as a receiving ship in 1822, she was eventually broken up in January 1836.

=== HMS Trent ===
First commissioned in March 1796 for service in the North Sea, Trent was briefly involved in the fleet mutinies of 1797, when her crew refused to set sail from Great Yarmouth on 22 May. They returned to duty when Admiral Adam Duncan's flagship came alongside and threatened to open fire. When Duncan sailed to meet the Dutch fleet, Trent was one of only four loyal ships that went with him, and kept the enemy in port by making signals to a fleet that did not exist. In November, Trent sailed for the Leeward Islands where, on 30 March 1799, she and the 10-gun cutter HMS Sparrow captured a Spanish ship and schooner in a cutting out expedition off Puerto Rico. Two other schooners were scuttled by their Spanish crews during the battle. In October 1800, while serving in the Channel, Trent's crew took part in another boat action when they boarded a cutter and a lugger off the Ile de Brehat.

Trent spent her last years as a fifth rate, in the West Indies. She returned home in June 1803, to be fitted as a hospital ship. Stationed at Cork, she served as flagship to the Commanders-in-chief on the Coast of Ireland Station. In November 1815, she was converted to a receiving ship. She remained at Cork until February 1823, when she was taken to Haulbowline and broken up.

=== HMS Glenmore ===
Captain George Duff was first to commission Glenmore in April 1796. She served initially in the North Sea, joining Admiral Adam Duncan's fleet in July. In May 1797, she left Duncan for service in the Channel. On arrival at Spithead, the ship's crew revolted in support of the fleet mutiny which was already in progress there. The dispute was resolved on 16 May and Glenmore was reassigned to the Irish station. While there, Glenmore played a part in suppressing the Irish Rebellion of 1798; her crew taking part in a boat action against rebel outposts near Wexford.

While escorting a large convoy to the West Indies in December 1799, Glenmore and another frigate, Aimable, encountered two French vessels, French frigate Sirène and French corvette Bergère, and the recently captured East Indiaman Calcutta. After a 35-minute engagement, Amiable had driven off the French warships while Glenmore recaptured Calcutta.

During a refit at Plymouth in March 1800, the naval architect Robert Seppings introduced, as an experiment, diagonal trusses that reduced hogging. Glenmore was subjected to another mutiny in May 1801, precipitated by a change of captain. The new commander was not popular, a much stricter disciplinarian who ordered up to five times as many floggings as his predecessor, and the crew felt that most of the punishments were excessive or unwarranted. Two of the ringleaders were court-martialled and hanged the following October. Three others stood trial but were released after the charge was not proven.

Glenmore continued to serve on the Irish Station until the Treaty of Amiens was ratified in March 1802, after which she served as a troopship for soldiers returning from the continent. She was later fitted as a receiving ship at Plymouth and remained there in ordinary until sold in 1814.
