= Calcutta (1794 ship) =

History

Great Britain
- Name: Calcutta
- Namesake: Calcutta
- Launched: 1794, Calcutta
- Captured: 17 December 1799, and recaptured the same day
- Fate: Wrecked 8 September 1801

General characteristics
- Tons burthen: 760, or 768, or 76890/94 bm)
- Armament: 8 × 12-pounder guns "of the New Construction"
- Notes: Three decks; teak-built; Hackman appears to have confused this Calcutta with another vessel, at least with respect to launch date and place and date of loss.

Calcutta was launched in 1794, on the Hooghly River. Between 1797 and 1799, she sailed to England on a voyage for the British East India Company (EIC). In 1799, the French Navy captured her, and the Royal Navy recaptured her. She was lost in 1801, in the Red Sea, sailing in support of the British Government's expedition to Egypt.

== Career ==
On 18 May 1797, Calcutta, Captain John Hassey, master, was at Calcutta. She left Bengal on 20 July. She reached Madras on 29 August, and Penang on 17 September. She was back at Madras on 11 December, and Calcutta on 29 January 1798. Bound for England, she was at Kedgeree on 8 December. She sailed from Bengal on 20 January 1799, reached St Helena on 2 April, and arrived at the Downs. Lloyd's List reported that Calcutta, Haggy, master, had arrived at Gravesend on 28 October.

Calcutta was admitted to the Registry of Great Britain on 29 August 1799. She appeared in the 1799 volume of Lloyd's Register (LR).

| Year | Master | Owner | Trade | Source |
|---|---|---|---|---|
| 1799 | J.Haggey | Captain & Co. | London–India | LR |

On 1 November 1799, Calcutta sailed from Deal for India. Before she departed she undergone outfitting at a cost of £3,879 7s 9d. On 20 November, she sailed from Portsmouth for Bengal.

On 11 January 1800, Calcutta was at Plymouth. She had been on her way to India from London when she was taken, and retaken.

On 1 December 1799, HMS Aimable and Glenmore encountered the French frigate Sirène, Citoyen Reignaud, captain, and French corvette Bergère, which were sailing to France from Cayenne. Bergère was carrying Victor Hugues as a passenger. The French vessels had with them the East Indiaman Calcutta, which they had captured the same morning; René Lemarant de Kerdaniel was captain of the prize crew on Calcutta. Glenmore recaptured Calcutta, while Aimable engaged Sirène and Bergère. A 35-minute action ensued before the two French vessels departed. Sirène had as prisoners Captain Haggy, Calcutta's master, her first and second mates, and 50 of her lascars and seamen. Calcutta arrived in Plymouth on 12 January 1800. On 18 January, 50 lascars were landed from Calcutta and taken to China House, which served as a hospital. The lascars were sick and suffering from the cold. Kerdaniel spent four months on a hulk in Chatham, before being sent back to France on parole.

As of 1 January 1801, Calcutta of 700 tons, appeared on a list of "ships belonging to Calcutta" with M'Donald, master, Haggey & M'Donald, owners.

After her return to India, the British government used Calcutta as a transport to support General Sir David Baird's expedition to the Red Sea, which in turn had the objective of supporting General Sir Ralph Abercrombie at the battle of Alexandria.

Calcutta does not appear in the list of transport vessels for the British expedition to the Red Sea (1801). Nor does her loss appear in Lloyd's List. However she does appear in a book of dispatches by Arthur Wellesley, the Duke of Wellington. There he lists six vessels that sailed on 31 March 1801, for the expedition. Of the six vessels – Calcutta, Eliza, Gabriel, Minerva, Pearl, and Ruby – all but Calcutta appear in the list of transport vessels.

Calcutta, M'Donald sailed from Bombay to the Red Sea on 10 May 1801.

== Loss ==
One source reports that Calcutta was wrecked on 8 September 1801, together with Gabriel, in the 1801 British military expedition to the Red Sea.

== Alternate account of loss ==
Hackman states that Calcutta was wrecked in 1807, on the coast of New Guinea on passage from Botany Bay to Canton, and that her crew was saved. He based this statement on a report in Lloyd's List. The report identified the vessel that was lost as Calcutta, of 760 tons.

What calls this account into question is that there is no supporting evidence in ship arrival and departure data for Port Jackson, or listings of Australian shipwrecks. The account probably represents a confusion with another vessel, Sydney, an East Indiaman of 900 tons, built at Java and registered at Calcutta. Sydney was lost on the coast of New Guinea in May 1806, while on her way from Port Jackson to Bengal to bring back rice for the colony.
