= Tartar (1775 ship) =

History

Great Britain
- Name: Tartar
- Launched: 1775, Bermuda
- Captured: October 1800

General characteristics
- Tons burthen: 70, or 90 (bm)
- Sail plan: Sloop
- Complement: 80
- Armament: 14 × 6-pounder guns, or 18 guns

Tartar was launched at Bermuda in 1775, possibly under another name. By 1779 she was a privateer sailing out of Liverpool. She captured several prizes, first in the West Indies and then around England. Two French frigates captured her in October 1780.

== Career ==
Some volumes of Lloyd's Register (LR) are not available on line, and some pages are missing from extant volumes. Consequently, Tartar first appeared online in Lloyd's Register for 1779.

On 7 January 1779, Tartar, Captain Allanson, was off Sambrera from where he wrote a letter to her owners. (Note: Sambrera may have been Sombrero, Anguilla.) He reported that on 31 October 1778 he had been west of Cape Finistere when he had captured Concorde, Deverger, master, of 500 tons (bm). Concorde, of Bordeaux, had been on her way to Cap François with 2500 barrels of flour, 800 barrels of beef, 200 hogsheads of wine, and more than 20 bales of dry goods, amongst which there were 600 ounces of silver. Allanson took Concorde into Antigua.

On 27 February Captain Allanson captured a large New England brig carrying 380 hogsheads of tobacco. He sent the brig into Antigua.

Next, Tartar, Allanson, master, captured the French slave ship Nairac, Antoine, master, which was coming from Angola with 697 slaves. (Note: Nairac, of 250 tons (French; "of load"), was owned by the famous and wealthy Bordeaux merchant Paul Nairac, and his older son. Her master was Antoine Babinot.) Tartar also captured Victory, from Nantucket, which was carrying lumber, fish, and oil. Tartar sent both into Kingston, Jamaica. (Note: 692 slaves were sold at Kingston for £25,560.) Tartar captured the sloop Hazard, from Providence, and sent her into Antigua.

Year	Master	Owner	Trade	Source & notes
1779	J.Allanson; G.Layborn	Backhouse	Liverpool privateer	LR; thorough repair 1778

Tartar, Leyborn, master, of Liverpool, captured a French snow and took her into St Kitts. The snow had been on her way from Guadeloupe to America with a cargo of sugar, rum, and molasses.

On 22 August 1780, Tartar returned to Liverpool, bringing with her a prize, St George, which was carrying a cargo of flax, iron, etc.

Next, Tartar captured a French privateer cutter of 16 guns. The cutter struck after a sharp engagement and Tartar took her into Penzance.

== Fate ==
The Tartar privateer, of Liverpool, Whytell, master, captured a vessel sailing from Ostend to Bordeaux that was carrying 420 hogsheads of tobacco. However, on 29 September two French frigates captured both Tartar and her prize. The French sent their prizes into Rochelle. One of the frigates was under the command of Mon. "Le Vicomte Mortimer". (Note: Mortimer was Victurnien-Henri-Elzéar de Rochechouart de Mortemart, captain of the French frigate Diligente.)

In late September and October 1780 the French frigates Aimable (26 guns) and Diligente, were escorting a convoy from Rochefort to Bayonne. On her way they captured three British cutters: Alert, of 18 guns, captured 25 September 1780; Tartar, 12 guns; and Jersey, of 12 guns. The French took Alert and Jersey into service.
