= HMS Tweed =

HMS Tweed may refer to any one of several Royal Navy ships named for the River Tweed, including:

- HMS Tweed (1759)
- HMS Tweed was an Amazon-class frigate ordered and laid down in 1795, but was renamed HMS Glenmore on 30 October 1795 before her launch in 1796.
- HMS Tweed (1807), a ship-sloop wrecked in 1813.
- HMS Tweed (1823), a 28-gun sixth-rate frigate built in 1823 at Portsmouth and sold in 1852.
- HMS Tweed (1877), a torpedo gunboat.
- HMS Tweed (K250), River-class frigate of 1,460 tons displacement launched about 1943 and sunk on 7 January 1944 during the Second World War.
