= Transport vessels for the British expedition to the Red Sea (1801) =

For the British expedition to the Red Sea (1801) the British government hired a number of transport vessels. The transports supported Major-General Sir David Baird's expedition in 1801 to the Red Sea. Baird was in command of the Indian army that was going to Egypt to help General Ralph Abercromby expel the French there. Baird landed at Kosseir, on the Egyptian side of the Red Sea. He then led his troops army across the desert to Kena on the Nile, and then to Cairo. He arrived in time for the battle of Alexandria. Captain Hardie of Shah Kaikusroo was appointed Commodore of the fleet of country ships.

Most of the transports were "country ships". Country ships were vessels that were registered in ports of British India such as Bombay and Calcutta, and that traded around India, with Southeast Asia, and China, but that did not sail to England without special authorization from the EIC. In addition, some of the transports were "regular ships" of the British East India Company (EIC), and some were "extra ships". Regular ships were on a long-term contract with the EIC, and extra ships were vessels the EIC had chartered for one or more voyages.

The data in the table below comes primarily from an 1814 report from a Select Committee of the House of Commons of the British Parliament, which provided the data only on country ships, giving the names of a large number of vessels, and their burthen (bm).

Also, transliteration of non-English names shows no consistency across sources, making it extremely difficult to try to find more information about the vessels in question.

== Country ships ==
Name	Burthen	Where built	Notes
Admiral Nelson	122		
Ann and Amelia	800	Whitby, 1781	Becomes HMS Mediator, 1804
Ann and Eliza	350		
Anna Maria	450		
Anstruther	450–654	Calcutta, 1800	Stranded 22 September 1803 in Balabac Strait
Auspicious	400 / 462	British, 1798	Sold 1821
Bly Merchant	480		
Byram Gore	456		
Candidate	700 / 709	Calcutta, 1797	Foundered in the Bay of Bengal, 1804
Cecilia	478	Contradictory information	Wrecked at Madeira, 1803
Commerce	413 / 450	Rangoon?	The French privateer Caroline captured her on 15 November 1805.
Cornwallis	633	Surat, 1789	Burnt 1841 at Bombay
Cuvera	936	Calcutta, 1798	Broken up 1853
Brig Dundas	176 / 187	Probably Philip Dundas, built at Bombay Dockyard in 1798 for the Bengal Pilot Service	Newbiggin, master; lost at Foul Bay between January 1801 and June 1802
Eliza	400 / 350	Rangoon	Gibson, master; north of Jiddah between January 1801 and June 1802
Expedition	70		
Fancy brig	125 / 100		
Fortune	182		Ketch; Jolliffe, master; near Mt. Agerib between January 1801 and June 1802
Friendship	400	Rangoon	
Friendship	872	Demaun, 1794	
Fyze Allum	700		Baird, master; Cape Orfin (or Cape Orsoy) on the coast of Africa, 7 June 1801;
Gabriel	825	Calcutta, 1794	Lost on the expedition; crew and passengers saved
Ganges	450		
Griffin	400		
Hercules	485		
Hope	500 / 580	Calcutta, 1800	
Jehanguire Shaw Jehangire	780 / 705	Deman	
Julia			Lost between January 1801 and June 1802
London	350		
Lowjee Family	926	Bombay, 1791	Destroyed by fire in Bombay Harbour, 1849
Milford	679 / 655	Bombay Dockyard, 1786	Wrecked in the Hooghly River in August 1829
Minerva	987 / 1057	Demaun, 1790	Launched as Amelia; captured 1808 by Al Qasimi pirates and almost the entire crew massacred.
Mornington	450		
Moorad Bux	279		
Raheem Shah	270 / 275	Bombay	
Ruby	300	Calcutta, 1800 or 1797	Lost 1814 or later
Pearl	450		
Serrah/Sarah	935	Bombay, 1792	"Lost in the French War"
Shah Ardasheer; Shah Ardaseer	868	Bombay, 1786, or 1787	Burnt at Bombay Harbour on 14 September 1809
Shah Kaikusroo	1046	Bombay, 1799	Broken up 1864
Shannon	90		
Sophia			
Sullimany, or Sulimanny	679	Demaun, 1797	
Superb	650	Calcutta, 1795	Lost 1814 or so
Susannah	244		Drysdale, master; lost between January 1801 and June 1802
Taz Balish	436		
Upton Castle	675	Bombay Dockyard, 1793	Burnt at Saugor, 1817
Warren Hastings	443	Calcutta, 1789	
William	393 / 400	Bombay Dockyard, 1800	

== EIC naval vessels ==
The following vessels were listed in the 1814 report as country ships, but were actually vessels of the EIC's navy, the Bombay Marine.

Name	Burthen	Where built	Notes
Fury			EIC schooner of 6 guns
Strombolo (or Stromboli)	485	Bombay, 1793	EIC bomb ketch/gun vessel of 12 × 3-pounder guns
Wasp			EIC schooner of 6 guns
