= French ship Aimable =

Many ships of the French Navy have been named Aimable including :

- French ship Aimable launched in 1690 and sold in 1714
- French ship Aimable launched in 1725 and broken up in 1736
- French frigate Aimable launched in 1776 and captured by the Royal Navy in 1782
