= HMS Trent (1796) =

Sailing frigate of the Royal Navy

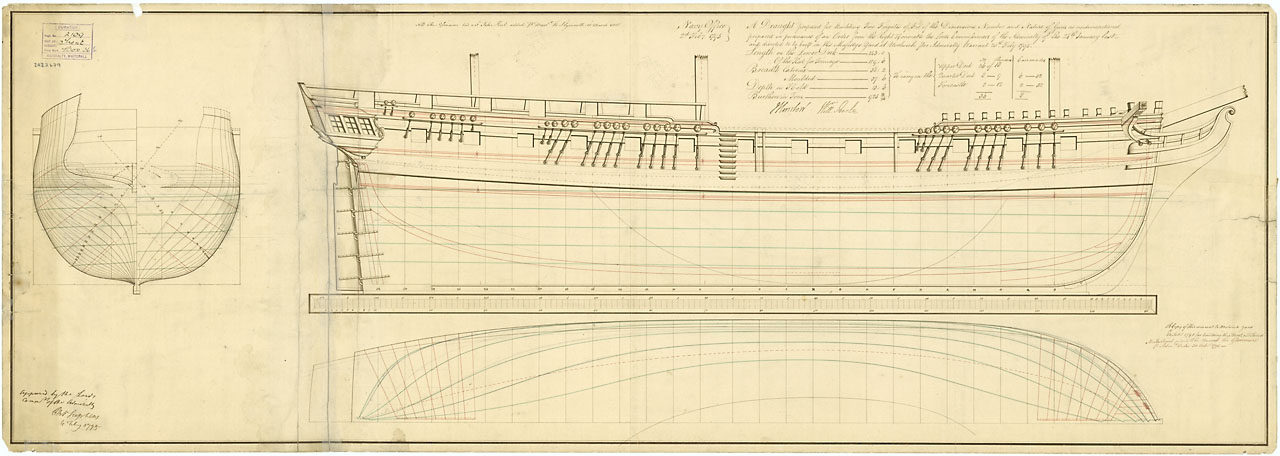
- Profile plan of Trent

History

Great Britain
- Name: HMS Trent
- Ordered: 24 January 1795
- Builder: John Tovery, Woolwich
- Cost: £25,915
- Laid down: March 1795
- Launched: 24 February 1796
- Completed: 25 May 1796
- Commissioned: March 1796

General characteristics
- Type: Fifth-rate frigate
- Tons burthen: 925 87/94 bm
- Length: 143 ft 0 in (43.59 m) (gundeck); 119 ft 6 in (36.42 m) (keel)
- Beam: 38 ft 2 in (11.63 m)
- Depth of hold: 13 ft 6 in (4.11 m)
- Propulsion: Sails
- Complement: 264
- Armament: 36 guns

HMS Trent was a fifth-rate sailing frigate of 36 guns, built for the Royal Navy and launched in February 1796. She carried a main battery of twenty-six 18-pounder (8.2-kilogram) long guns. She and her sister ship HMS Glenmore were constructed from pitch pine rather than oak.

First commissioned in March 1796 for service in the North Sea, Trent was briefly involved in the fleet mutinies of 1797 but returned to duty when Admiral Adam Duncan's flagship came alongside and threatened to open fire. When Duncan sailed to meet the Dutch fleet, Trent was one of only four loyal ships that went with him, and kept the enemy in port by making signals to a fleet that did not exist. In November, Trent sailed for the Leeward Islands where, on 30 March 1799, she and the armed cutter, HMS Sparrow, captured a Spanish ship and a schooner in a cutting out expedition off Puerto Rico. Two other schooners were scuttled by their Spanish crews during the battle. In October 1800, while serving in the English Channel, Trent's crew took part in another boat action when they boarded a cutter and a lugger off the Ile de Brehat.

Trent spent her last years of active service, in the West Indies. She returned home in June 1803, to be fitted as a hospital ship. Stationed at Cork, she served as flagship to the Commanders-in-chief on the Coast of Ireland Station. In November 1815, she was converted to a receiving ship. She remained at Cork until February 1823, when she was taken to Haulbowline and broken up.

== Construction and armament ==
HMS Trent was one of four 36-gun, 18-pounder, Amazon-class frigates built for the Royal Navy, to a design by William Rule. (Note: The original Amazon-class frigates were 32-gun, 12-pounder, frigates of 677 tons (bm), designed by Sir John Williams and built between 1771 and 1782. In need of a larger frigate, in 1794, the Admiralty asked Sir William Rule to design a 36-gun, 18-pounder, Amazon-class frigate. Originally a series of four, by the time the first one had been launched in 1795, Rule had already drawn up plans for Naiad, an expanded version which was larger at 1,013 tons (bm), had a complement of 284 men and carried 38 guns. A third design was unveiled in 1796, also with 38 guns but larger still at 1,038 tons (bm) and with a crew of 300 men. Two were ordered, one in April 1796 and a second in February 1797.) Frigates of the period were three-masted, full-rigged ships that carried their main battery on a single, continuous gun deck. They were smaller and faster than ships of the line and primarily intended for raiding, reconnaissance and messaging. Since late 1778, those of 36 or 38 guns with a main armament of 18-pounder long guns, had become the standard in the Royal Navy and by 1793, when the French Revolutionary War began, it was not unusual for them to be close to 1000 tons burthen (bm).

Trent and her sister ship HMS Glenmore were ordered on 24 January 1795 to be built from pitch pine rather than oak. The shortage of timber, and in particular oak, was a constant problem for the Royal Navy in the 18th and 19th centuries. Softwoods were easier to work and did not require as much seasoning so fir-built frigates could be produced quicker. They were not as strong however, and did not last as long as their oak-built counterparts.

Work began in March at Woolwich Dockyard when Trent's keel of 119 ft 6 in (36.42 m) was laid down. As built, her dimensions were 143 ft (44 m) along the gun deck with a beam of 38 ft 2 in (11.63 m) and a depth in hold of 13 ft 6 in (4.11 m), making her 925 87/94 tons burthen (bm).

Trent was a fifth rate, built to carry a main battery of twenty-six 18-pounder (8.2-kilogram) long guns on her gun deck, eight 12 pdr (5.4 kg) on the quarterdeck and two on the forecastle. She additionally carried eight 32 pdr (15 kg) carronades, six on the quarterdeck and two on the forecastle. (Note: The gun-rating of a vessel was the number of long guns it was designed to carry and did not always match its actual armament. Before 1817, carronades were not counted at all unless they were direct replacements for long guns.) Carronades were lighter so could be manoeuvred with fewer men, and had a faster rate of fire but had a much shorter range than the long gun. When fully manned, Amazon-class frigates had a complement of 264 but due to a perpetual shortage of seamen during periods of war, Trent averaged a crew of less than 248 throughout her career.

== Service ==
Trent was first commissioned in March 1796 for service in the North Sea, under Captain Edward Bowater, who later became Admiral, and father to Edward Bowater. Following her completion on 25 May, Trent was sent to the Great Yarmouth where she joined Admiral Adam Duncan's North Sea Fleet and in September, Trent came under the temporary command of acting captain John Gore.

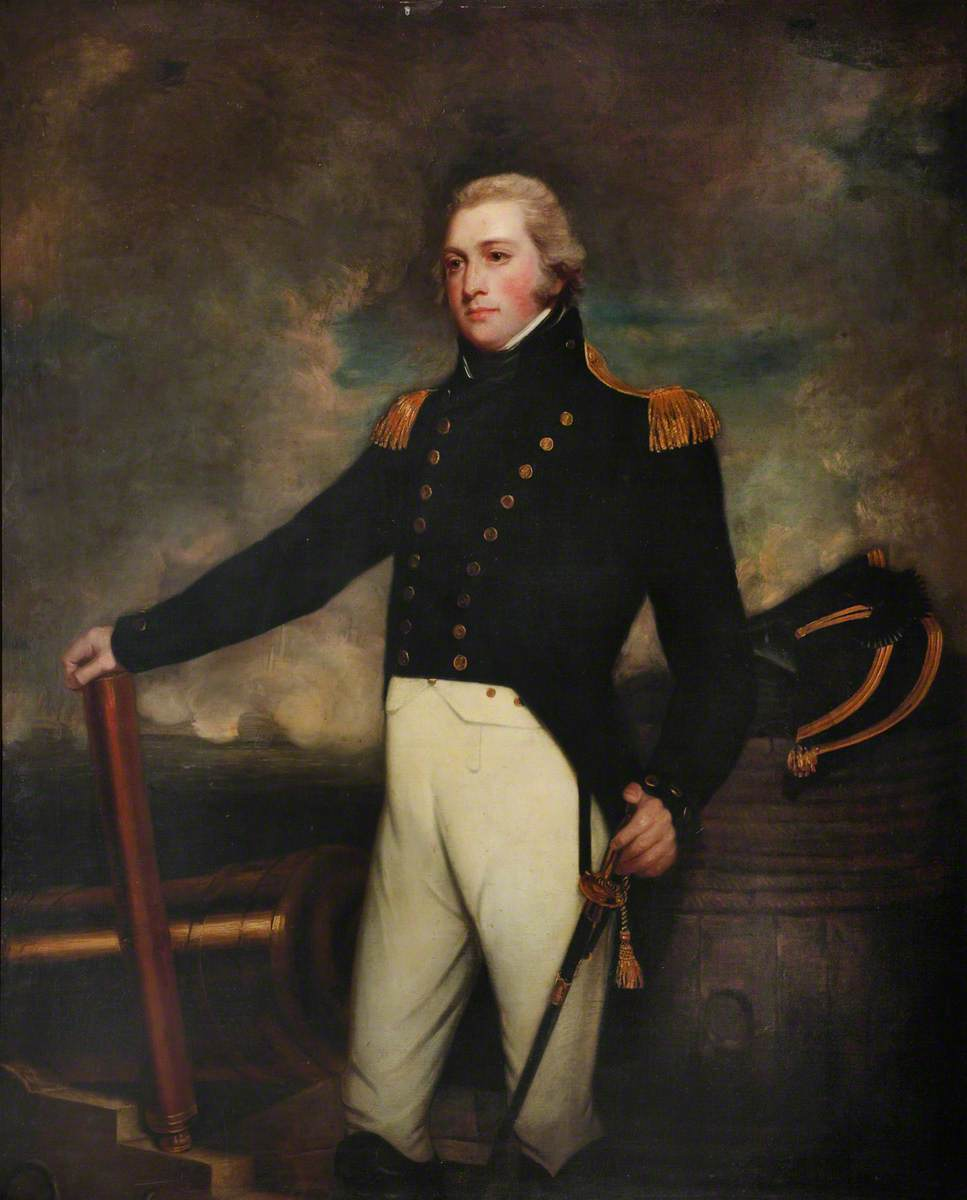
John Gore, Trent's captain during the Nore Mutiny

On 22 May 1797, during the Nore Mutiny, Trent's crew disobeyed an order to set sail but returned to duty after Duncan, in the ship-of-the-line, HMS Venerable, threatened to open fire on them. When word was received that the Dutch fleet was making ready to leave its base at Texel, the North Sea Fleet was confounded by contrary winds and could not sail. When it finally left its anchorage on 29 May, most of the ships deserted, either returning to Yarmouth or sailing to join the mutineers at the Nore. Only Duncan’s flagship, along with the ship-of-the-line HMS Adamant, and the frigates HMS Circe and Trent remained loyal. When the four ships reached Texel, Duncan sent Circe and Trent to cruise off the island in full sight of the enemy while making bogus signals to a non-existent fleet. The ploy worked and the Dutch fleet remained in port.

On 26 June 1797, while still under Gore, Trent captured the privateer, Poisson Volant 30 nmi (56 km) east of Yarmouth. She was a 14-gun lugger 18 days out of Le Havre and had already taken two prizes. The crew had thrown the guns overboard in an attempt to lighten the load and escape. Captain Richard Bagot assumed command in October 1797, and in November, sailed Trent to the Leeward Islands. Bagot died in the June following and was replaced with Captain Robert Ottoway, on the Jamaica Station. Trent captured a small prize in July 1798 then in February 1799, while still in the West Indies, Trent and the sixth-rate frigate, HMS Squirrel, captured a 14-gun privateer, Penada.

Trent, in company with the armed cutter, HMS Sparrow, was cruising off Puerto Rico on 30 March 1799, when several Spanish vessels were spotted in a bay near Cabo Rojo. The Spanish flotilla, comprising a merchant ship and three schooners, was riding at anchor in the shoal water, under the protection of a five-gun shore battery. Boats from Trent and Sparrow were sent in a cutting out expedition. Sparrow, being of shallower draught, was able to get close enough to provide covering fire, while marines and seamen were landed to deal with the shore guns. In the meantime, the remainder of the crews boarded and captured the Spanish ship and one of the schooners. Two other schooners were scuttled by their Spanish crews. A little further up the coast, in June, the French schooner, Triumphant, was captured in a bay near Agauda. Two of Trent's boats were sent in and emerged a little later with the prize in tow. More success followed in March 1800 when a Spanish privateer was captured by Trent.

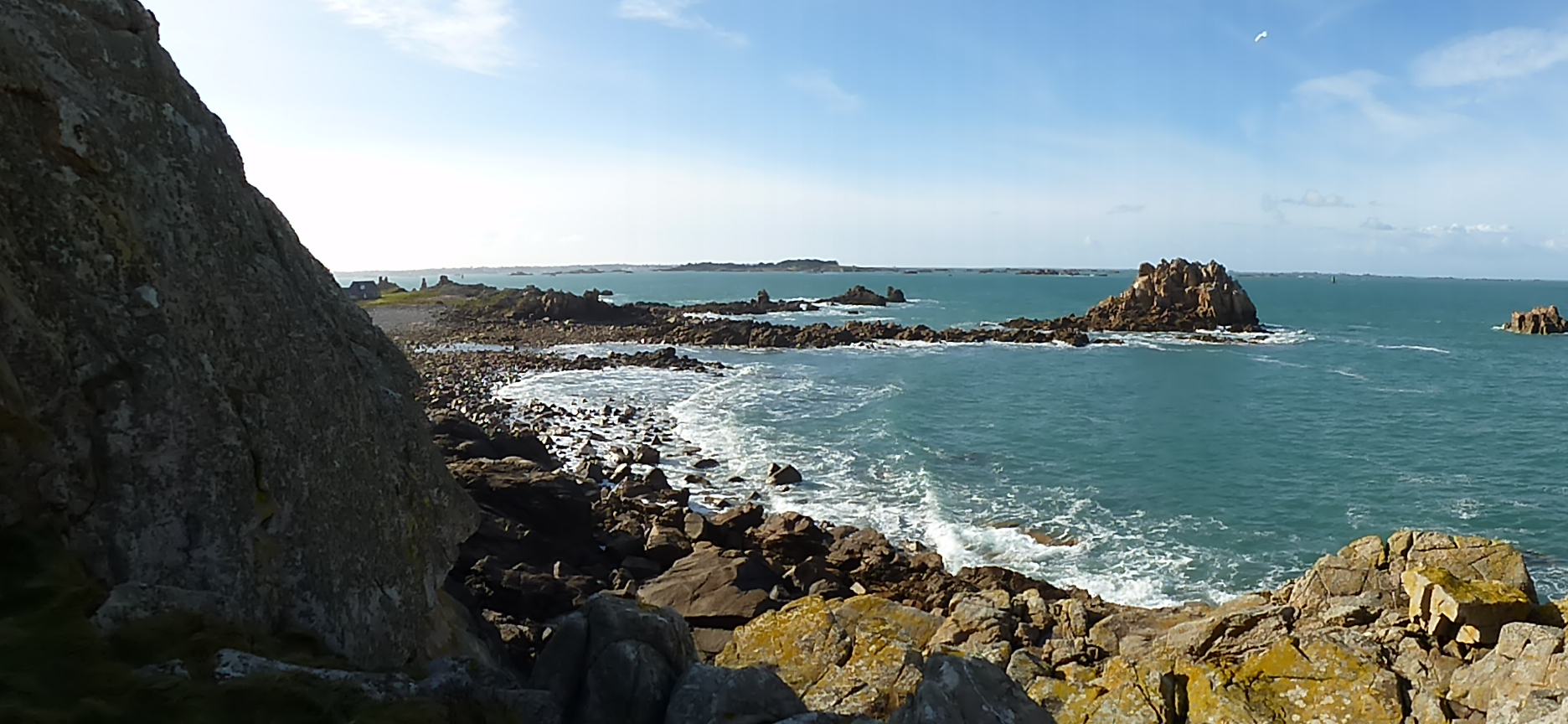
The rocky coast of the Ile de Brehat where Trent's crew fought a boat action in April 1801

In October 1800, Captain Edward Hamilton was appointed to Trent in the English Channel and given command of a small squadron blockading the French ports of St Malo, Cherbourg and Le Havre. On 3 April 1801, Trent was anchored off the Ile de Brehat. At dawn, a French ship, a cutter and a lugger were seen sailing towards Paimpol. Hamilton immediately sent Trent's boats in pursuit. Initially there was an attempt to escape and boats were dispatched from the shore which then joined the lugger in taking the ship in tow. When it became obvious that battle was inevitable, the ship was cut loose and the remaining French vessels retreated to within range of the shore batteries. The action ended when the French were driven onto the rocks and Trent's crew boarded the drifting ship. She turned out to be an ex-British merchantman that had been taken as a prize.

Trent, the 36-gun frigate HMS Fortunee and the 10-gun cutter HMS Dolphin, were off Jersey on 20 April, when a lugger was spotted. After a ten-hour chase the French privateer, which turned out to be the 10-gun Renard from St Malo, was captured near St Aubin's Bay. On 22 January 1802, Hamilton was court-martialled for cruelty, having had an elderly gunner tied in Trent's rigging. After an hour-and-a-half, the man was cut down, having fainted from the extreme cold. Hamilton was dismissed by the Admiralty but was later reinstated.

Flag officers aboard Trent while stationed at Cork.
Officer	Years
Admiral Alan Gardner, 1st Baron Gardner	1803–1804
Rear-Admiral William O'Bryen Drury	1805
Admiral Alan Gardner, 1st Baron Gardner	1806
Admiral Sir James Hawkins-Whitshed	1807–1810
Vice-Admiral Edward Thornbrough	1810–1813
Vice-Admiral Sir Herbert Sawyer	1813–1815

On 13 February 1803, Trent sailed for Jamaica once again, under a new captain, Charles Brisbane. Isaac Wooley and after, James Katon served as captains before Trent returned to home waters in June to be recommissioned under Commander Walter Grosset and fitted as a hospital ship at Plymouth. The work took until August. Trent was then dispatched to Cork where she served as flagship to successive commanders-in-chief on the Coast of Ireland Station. (Note: Alan Gardiner (1803–1804) (1806), William O'Bryen Drury (1805), James Whitshed (1807–1810), Edward Thornbrough (1810–1813), Herbert Sawyer (1813–1815).) She was commissioned twice more, under Commander Thomas Young in 1811 and Commander G. Lampriere in 1813 but remained a hospital ship and flagship at Cork until 1815.

== Later service and fate ==
In November 1815, the Admiralty issued an order that Trent was to be laid up. She continued to serve at Cork as a receiving ship until February 1823, when she was taken to Haulbowline and broken up.
