= HMS Glenmore (1796) =

British sailing frigate 1796–1814

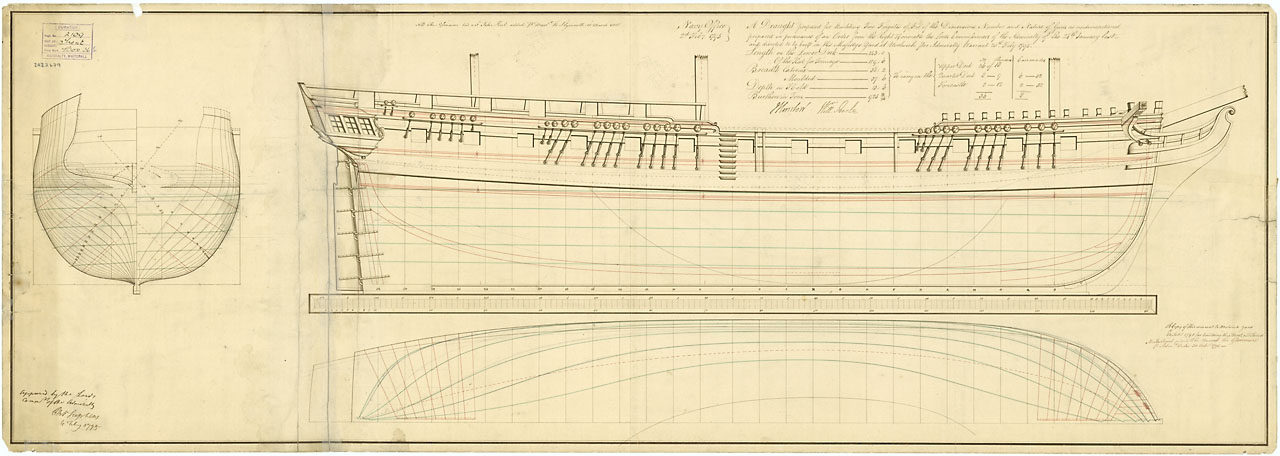
- Profile plan for Glenmore and her sister ship, Trent

History

United Kingdom
- Name: HMS Glenmore
- Ordered: 24 January 1795
- Builder: Woolwich Dockyard (M/shipwright John Tovey)
- Laid down: March 1795
- Launched: 24 March 1796
- Commissioned: April 1796
- Fate: Sold November 1814

General characteristics
- Class & type: Amazon-class frigate
- Tons burthen: 92587/94 (bm)
- Length: Overall: 143 ft (43.6 m); Keel: 119 ft 6 in (36.4 m)
- Beam: 38 ft 2 in (11.6 m)
- Depth of hold: 13 ft 6 in (4.1 m)
- Crew: 264
- Armament: Gundeck: 26 × 18-pounder guns; QD: 8 × 12-pounder guns + 6 × 32-pounder carronades; Fc: 2 × 12-pounder guns + 2 × 32-pounder carronades

HMS Glenmore was a 36-gun Amazon-class frigate designed by William Rule for the Royal Navy. Tweed had been the intended name when she was laid down in March of 1795 but this was changed before her launch in March 1796. A fifth rate, the ship carried a main battery of twenty-six 18-pounder (8.2-kilogram) long guns on her gun deck.

First commissioned during the French Revolutionary Wars, Glenmore joined Admiral Adam Duncan's fleet in the North Sea, leaving for service in the English Channel in May 1797. On arrival at Spithead, the ship's crew revolted in support of the fleet mutiny which was already in progress there. The dispute was resolved on 16 May and Glenmore was reassigned to the Irish station. While there, Glenmore played a part in suppressing the Irish Rebellion of 1798; her crew attacking rebel outposts near Wexford.

While escorting a large convoy to the West Indies in December 1799, Glenmore and the frigate Aimable encountered two French vessels, the frigate Sirène and the corvette Bergère, and the recently captured East Indiaman Calcutta. After a 35-minute engagement, Amiable drove off the French warships while Glenmore recaptured Calcutta. In February 1800, Glenmore underwent a refit at Plymouth, during which the naval architect Robert Seppings introduced diagonal trusses that reduced hogging.

Glenmore was subjected to another mutiny in May 1801, precipitated by a change of captain. The new commander was a stricter disciplinarian than his predecessor, and the crew felt that most of the punishments were excessive or unwarranted. Two of the ringleaders were court-martialled and hanged the following October. Glenmore continued to serve on the Irish Station until the Treaty of Amiens was ratified in March 1802, after which she served as a troopship for soldiers returning from the continent. She was later fitted as a receiving ship at Plymouth and remained there in ordinary until sold on 3 November 1814.

== Design and construction ==
HMS Glenmore was a 36-gun sailing frigate built for the Royal Navy during the French Revolutionary Wars. Designed by William Rule, Glenmore was one of the four ships that made up his Amazon-class of 1795. Rule's original Amazon class were 32-gun, 12-pounder, frigates of 677 tons (bm), built between 1771 and 1782. In need of a larger frigate, in 1794, the Admiralty asked for a 36-gun, 18-pounder version.

The first two, HMS Amazon and HMS Emerald, were ordered on 24 May 1794, and were built from oak but the second pair, ordered on 24 January 1795, Glenmore and her sister ship, HMS Trent, were constructed of pitch pine. The motive for the use of pine – an inferior material for shipbuilding – was speed of construction. It was much quicker to build a ship with this material because softwoods are easier to work and do not require as much seasoning; the drawback was that these fir-built ships were less durable than their oak-built counterparts. The two frigates underwent design alterations common in fir-built ships, notably a flat, square tuck stern.

Work began in March when Glenmore's keel of 119 ft 6 in (36.42 m) was laid down at Woolwich Dockyard under the supervision of the master shipwright John Tovey. As built, her dimensions were 143 ft (44 m) along the gundeck with a beam of 38 ft 2 in (11.63 m) and a depth in hold of 13 ft 6 in (4.11 m), making her 925 87/94 tons burthen (bm). Glenmore was ordered and laid down as HMS Tweed, but was renamed on 30 October 1795, before her launch on 24 March 1796.

Glenmore was a fifth rate, built to carry a main battery of twenty-six 18-pounder (8.2-kilogram) long guns on her gun deck, eight 12 pounders (5.4 kilograms) on the quarterdeck and two on the forecastle. She additionally carried eight 32 pounders (15 kilograms) carronades; six on the quarterdeck and two on the forecastle. When fully manned, she would carry a complement of 264 officers, men, and boys.

The Amazon class of 1795 were originally intended as a series of four, but by the time the first one had been launched in 1795, Rule had already drawn up plans for HMS Naiad, an expanded version that was larger at 1,013 tons (bm), had a complement of 284 men and carried 38 guns. A third design was unveiled in 1796, also with 38 guns but larger still at 1,038 tons (bm) and with a crew of 300 men. Two were ordered, one in April 1796 and a second in February 1797.

== Career ==
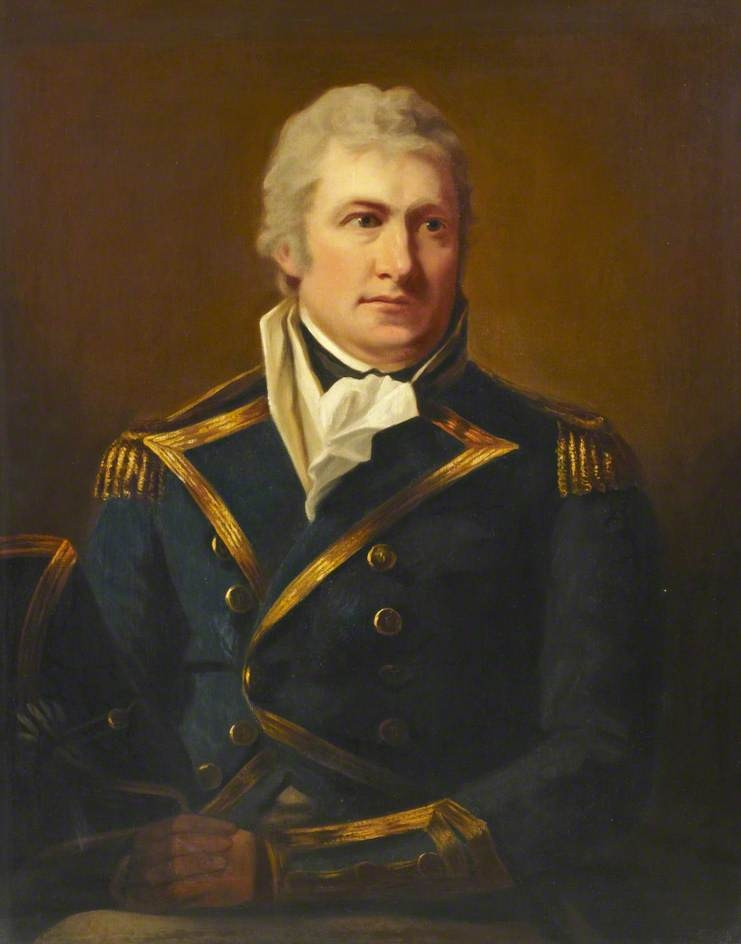
George Duff, Glenmore's first captain, from April 1796 to January 1801

Captain George Duff commissioned Glenmore in April 1796 for the North Sea and after joining Admiral Adam Duncan's fleet in July, spent several months harassing enemy shipping and escorting convoys to and from the Baltic. Transferring to the Western Squadron in May 1797, she sailed to Portsmouth, where she became embroiled in the fleet mutiny, a dispute over pay and conditions. Glenmore anchored at Spithead on 7 May and at 13:00 on 9 May, a group of delegates from the ships already in revolt, came on board and spoke to her complement. That evening, a portion of the crew broke into the small arms and powder lockers, threw the sergeant of marines overboard and posted guards throughout the ship. The following day, the mutineers requested that they be allowed to return to work, which was agreed, although they sent a boat to St Helens, Isle of Wight for further instructions from the delegates. On its return at 16:00, another marine was put over the side and the next morning, the crew ordered several of the officers and the surgeon's mate, off the ship. Glenmore remained in a state of mutiny until 16 May when it was announced that most of the mutineers demands had been met and that all those involved would be pardoned.

Glenmore sailed to join the Irish station on 26 May, capturing a smuggler in Cawsand Bay on the way, before putting in to Belfast Lough. While on escort duty in May 1798, Glenmore heard from a passing ship, that the United Irishmen had risen up. Duff immediately ordered the ship to seek out the rest of the squadron. On 20 June, Glenmore's crew took part in a boat action against rebel outposts near Wexford. They were joined in their endeavours by men from the frigates HMS Endymion, Melampus, Phoenix and Unicorn. The Irish Rebellion of 1798 ended when its leaders were killed at the Battle of Vinegar Hill. Glenmore transferred to Cork in August, from where she guarded the Western Approaches.

In December 1799 Glenmore and the sixth rate frigate HMS Aimable were escorting the West India convoy, comprising 40 to 50 vessels, from Cork. At 09:00, on 17 December, one of the convoy spotted an unidentified sail to the south-west of Porto Santo. Amiable was sent to investigate and at 09:30 was close enough to make out three vessels; two French men-of-war and a larger ship with the uppermost sections of her masts removed. Amiable returned at 10:00 and after a short discourse, the two British frigates set off in pursuit. Just after 11:00, the chase split when the larger ship suddenly changed direction. Having yet to identify her and thinking she might be a razee, Duff, in the more powerful of the two British ships, followed. At around 12:30, after Glenmore had got within range, her quarry pulled up and showed a British ensign to indicate her surrender. Glenmore took possession of what turned out to be the East Indiaman Calcutta, which had been captured that same morning; René Lemarant de Kerdaniel was captain of the prize crew. At 14:40, Aimable was close enough to engage the two ships she had been chasing. A 35-minute action ensued before the two French vessels, which were identified as the frigate Sirène and the corvette Bergère, departed. They had been sailing to Cayenne from Rochelle. (Note: Volume 3 of the Naval Chronicle has the French travelling in the opposite direction, from Cayenne to France) Bergère was carrying Victor Hugues as a passenger, to his new appointment as Governor of French Guiana. Sirène, captained by Citoyen Reignaud, had as prisoners Captain Haggy, Calcutta's master, her first and second mates, and 50 of her lascars and seamen. Calcutta arrived in Plymouth on 12 January 1800. On 18 January 50 lascars were landed from Calcutta and taken to China House, which served as a hospital. The lascars were sick and suffering from the cold.

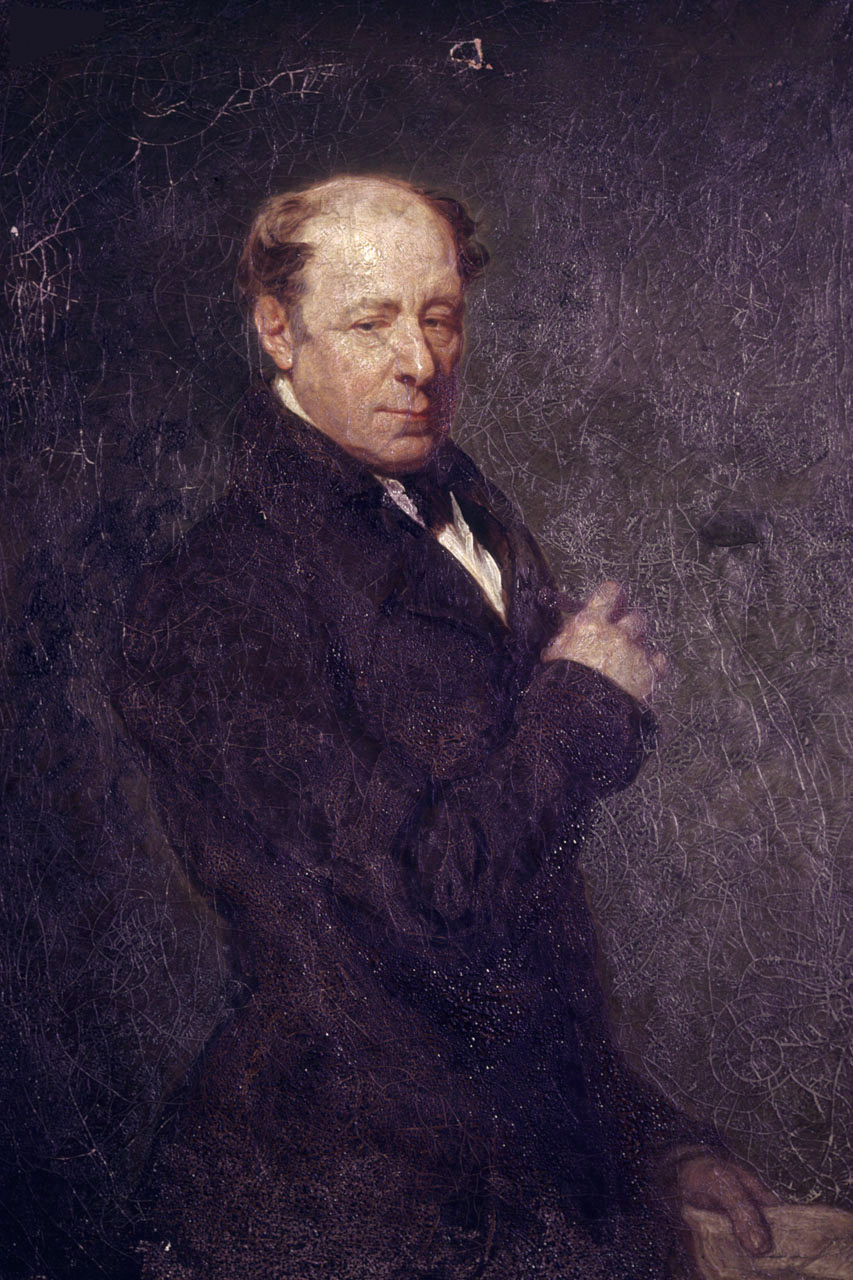
Robert Seppings, Surveyor of the Navy, had diagonal trusses fitted to Glenmore in 1800 while he was the assistant master shipwright at Plymouth

Glenmore returned to Plymouth from Cork on 6 February. Six days later she came into Plymouth again and went up the harbour to undergo a refit, putting into dock on 19 March. During the refit, the assistant master shipwright Robert Seppings introduced, as an experiment, diagonal trusses that reduced hogging. Glenmore sailed again on 10 June, later capturing the French schooner Esperance and recapturing two British merchant vessels, William and Salem. (Note: The French privateer Minerve had captured William, LeQuesne, master, as William was sailing from the West Indies to Guernsey.) All three captures were sent into Cork; Salem arriving on 1 July, Esperance on 8 July and William on 11 July. Later in the year, Glenmore and the frigate HMS Hind escorted to Madeira the fleet for the West Indies from Cork and Portsmouth. After leaving Madeira on 29 October, they continued some distance to the south-west before Glenmore began the return journey to her station.

Duff transferred to the 74-gun third rate ship of the line HMS Courageaux in January 1801 and was replaced by Captain John Talbot. Glenmore continued to serve on the Irish station where she was later subjected to a further mutiny. The revolt was precipitated by the change of captain; Talbot was not popular, a much stricter disciplinarian who ordered up to five times as many floggings as his predecessor. The crew felt that most of the punishments were excessive or unwarranted and on 2 May, petitioned the Commander-in-Chief, Lord Gardner who chose to ignore it. Tensions reached a peak on 5 June when, following an altercation in which two seamen insulted the boatswain's mate, more floggings were ordered. In protest, the crew deserted their posts and went below but were retrieved at sword point by the officers. The punishments were then carried out while the marines stood sentry with their muskets loaded. During the subsequent investigation it transpired that around 150 of the crew had sworn an oath on the bible, that they would not go to sea with their current captain. Two of the ringleaders were court-martialled and hanged the following October. Three others stood trial but were released after the charge was not proven.

On 15 May Lloyd's List reported that Glenmore had recaptured two merchant vessels that had fallen prey to the French privateer Braave. One vessel was Camilla, Preston, master, which had been sailing from Grenada to Liverpool. The other was Guiana Planter, Wedge, master, which had been sailing from St Kitts to Portsmouth. Glenmore sent Guiana Planter into Cork. Braave later captured six more merchant vessels, Victory, Vine, Ann, Urania, Cecilia, and Urania. Braave put all her prisoners on Ann, Silk, master, and let her go. Glenmore recaptured Urania and set off after Braave. Glenmore then recaptured West Indian, Victory, Vine, and Cecilia. They and Urania all arrived at Cork.

Glenmore had been taking a convoy to New Foundland in June when they met another convoy travelling in the opposite direction. This second group of merchantmen had become separated from its escort in a storm and Glenmore offered her protection. On approaching the Irish coast, a French privateer attacked and set on fire one of the convoy before being chased and captured by Glenmore

The Treaty of Amiens was ratified in March 1802, bringing the war to an end. Glenmore then served as a transport for returning troops. In June Glenmore escorted the frigate HMS Engageante to Plymouth. Engageante had been a hospital and then receiving ship at Cork and was under the command of Lieutenant Donocliff. Although it was expected that Engageante would be broken up at Plymouth, that did not occur until 1811.

In July Captain John Maitland replaced Talbot and on 30 July, Glenmore sailed in company with the frigates HMS Amethyst and Galatea for the Isle of Wight. There they were to pick up Dutch troops for return to Holland. In December Maitland commissioned another frigate, HMS Boadicea. Glenmore was then temporarily fitted as a receiving ship at Plymouth before being placed in Ordinary there.

The "Principal Officers and Commissioners of His Majesty's Navy" offered "Glenmore, of 36 guns and 926 tons", lying at Plymouth, for sale on 3 November 1814. She sold there on that date for £1,990.
