= HMS Amazon (1795) =

Frigate of the Royal Navy

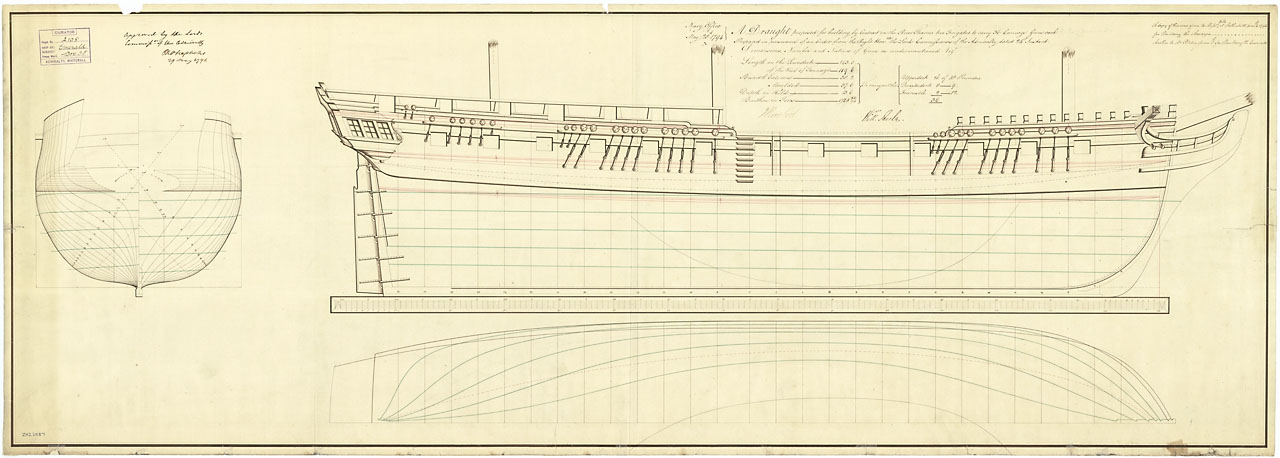
- Original profile plan of Amazon and her sister ship, Emerald, built to the same lines and dimensions.

History

Great Britain
- Name: HMS Amazon
- Namesake: Amazons
- Ordered: 24 May 1794
- Builder: Wells & Co., Rotherhithe
- Laid down: June 1794
- Launched: 4 July 1795
- Completed: 25 September 1795 at Deptford Dockyard
- Commissioned: July 1795
- Fate: Wrecked, 14 January 1797

General characteristics
- Type: Amazon-class fifth-rate frigate
- Tons burthen: 933 67/94 bm
- Length: 143 ft 2.5 in (43.650 m) (gundeck); 119 ft 5.5 in (36.411 m) (keel)
- Beam: 38 ft 4 in (11.68 m)
- Depth of hold: 13 ft 6 in (4.11 m)
- Propulsion: Sails
- Complement: 264
- Armament: Gundeck: 26 × 18-pounder long guns; QD: 8 × 9-pounder long guns + 6 × 32-pounder carronades; Fc: 2 × 9-pounder long guns + 2 × 32-pounder carronades

HMS Amazon, was a 36-gun Amazon-class frigate, built at Rotherhithe in 1795 to a design by Sir William Rule. Carrying a main battery of 18-pounder long guns, she was the first of a class of four frigates. She had a short but eventful career during the French Revolutionary War, which she spent in the Channel and Western Approaches, part of a frigate squadron under Sir Edward Pellew. She was wrecked in Audierne Bay in 1797, following an action on 13 January with the French ship-of-the-line, Droits de l'Homme.

== Construction and armament ==
Amazon was a 36-gun, 18-pounder, Amazon-class frigate built for the Royal Navy to a design by Sir William Rule. Frigates of the period were three-masted, full-rigged ships that carried their main battery on a single, continuous gun deck. They were smaller and faster than ships of the line and primarily intended for raiding, reconnaissance and messaging.

The original Amazon-class were 32-gun, 12-pounder, frigates of 677 tons (bm), designed by Sir John Williams and built between 1771 and 1782. These were outgunned by the French however, and after that point the British had tended towards a larger and more heavily armed frigate. Those of 36 or 38 guns with a main armament of 18-pounder long guns, became the standard in the Royal Navy and by 1793, when the French Revolutionary War began, it was not unusual for them to be close to 1000 tons burthen (bm). In 1794 therefore, the Admiralty asked Rule to design a 36-gun, 18-pounder, Amazon-class frigate. (Note: Originally a series of four, by the time the first one had been launched, Rule had already drawn up plans for Naiad, an expanded version which was larger at 1,013 tons (bm), had a complement of 284 men and carried 38 guns. A third design was unveiled in 1796, also with 38 guns but larger still at 1,038 tons (bm) and with a crew of 300 men. Two were ordered, one in April 1796 and a second in February 1797.)

Amazon and her sister ship HMS Emerald were ordered on 24 May 1794 and built to the same dimensions: 143 feet 2 1/2 inches (43.6 m) along the gun deck with a beam of 38 feet 4 inches (11.7 m) and a depth in hold of 13 feet 6 inches (4.1 m). They were 933 67/94 tons (bm) a piece.

Work began in June at Rotherhithe by John and William Wells & Co, when the 119 feet 5 1/2 inches (36.4 m) keel was laid down. Launched on 4 July 1795, Amazon was taken to Deptford where she was completed between 3–25 September. Including fitting, her construction had cost £24,681. Unladen, Amazon drew between 10 feet 3 inches (3.1 m) at the bow, and 15 feet 3 inches (4.6 m) at the stern.

Amazon was built to carry a main battery of twenty-six 18-pounder (8.2-kilogram) long guns on her gun deck, eight 9-pounder (4.1 kg) guns on the quarterdeck and two on the forecastle. She additionally carried eight 32-pounder (15 kg) carronades, six on the quarterdeck and two on the forecastle. (Note: The gun-rating of a vessel was the number of long guns it was designed to carry and did not always match its actual armament. Before 1817, carronades were not counted at all unless they were direct replacements for long guns.) Carronades were lighter so could be manoeuvred with fewer men, and had a faster rate of fire but had a much shorter range than the long gun. When fully manned, Amazon-class frigates had a complement of 264.

The Admiralty ordered a second pair of Amazon-class ships on 24 January 1795. They were marginally smaller at 92587/94 tons (bm) and were built from pitch pine. (Note: The second pair of Amazons were named Trent and Glenmore and were launched in 1796 on 24 February and 24 March, respectively.)

== Service ==
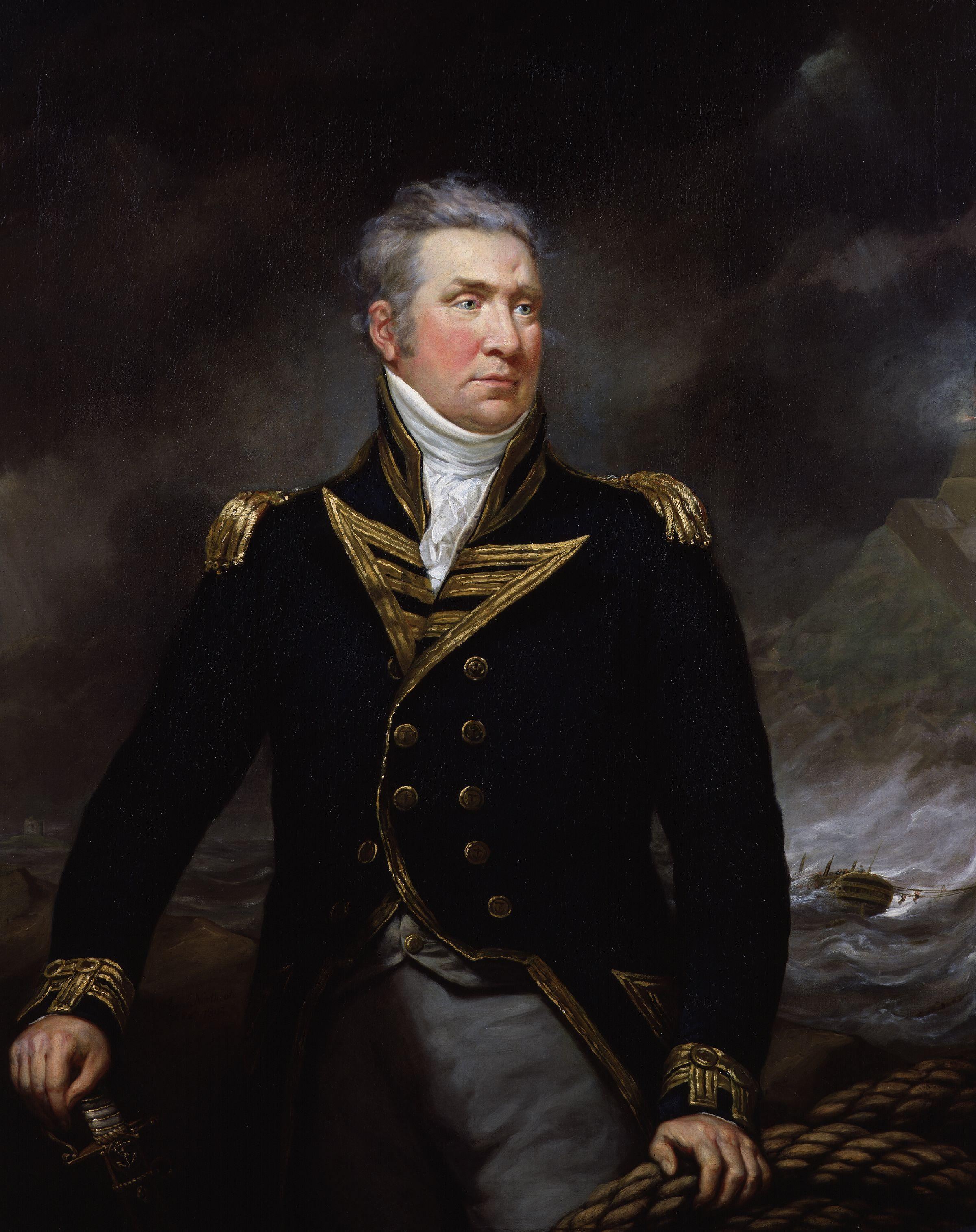
Sir Edward Pellew; whose frigate squadron Amazon spent her entire career in.

Amazon was first commissioned in July 1795 for service in the English Channel. Launched on 4 July, under Captain Robert Carthew Reynolds, she joined Sir Edward Pellew's frigate squadron, watching the port of Brest for any attempt by the French fleet to put to sea.

On 20 March 1796, Amazon and Pellew's ship, the 44-gun Indefatigable, pursued three French corvettes in the Bay of Biscay. Two escaped into the Loire at Saint-Nazaire, the third was dismasted and beached at the mouth of the river. Here she was protected by the shore batteries and her crew were later able to get her off. She was the 26-gun Volage. Amazon had four of her crew wounded in the affair. In his report, written on 9 April, Pellew revealed that his squadron had also captured seven enemy brigs and two chasse-marees.

Amazon, Indefatigable, the 44-gun Argo, the 38-gun Révolutionnaire and the 36-gun Concorde were cruising off Ushant, late in the afternoon of 13 April, when a ship was seen to windward. Pellew ordered Révolutionnaire to sail an intercepting course while the rest of the squadron gave chase. Révolutionnaire eventually cut off the quarry, which turned out to be the French 32-gun frigate, Unité, and after a brief exchange of fire, forced her to surrender. A week later, on 20 April, Amazon was again in pursuit of an enemy frigate. With Argo in Plymouth and Révolutionnaire on her way home with her prize, the three remaining British frigates were lying-to off The Lizard, when the 40-gun Virginie was spotted. Indefatigable, being the best sailer, was first to engage, after a 168 nmi (311 km) chase, lasting 15 hours. When Amazon and Concorde caught up, the French ship surrendered. She was taken into Plymouth where Indefatigable and Amazon, having been damaged in the engagement, underwent repairs.

Two French navy corvettes were sighted about eight leagues off Ushant while Indefatigable, Amazon, Concorde, Revolutionaire, and the 36-gun Phoebe, were cruising on 12 June. After a 24-hour chase, the squadron succeeded in capturing both. One was Blonde, of ten guns and 95 men, and the other was Trois Couleurs, of ten guns and 75 men. They were provisioned for a six-week cruise, and two days out of Brest but had captured nothing. Amazon shared the prize money with the rest of the squadron. The prize money notice referred to "La Blonde, alias Le Betsey". Amazon, Phoebe, Revolutionaire and Indefatigable, intercepted and detained five Spanish ships in September. The same ships made three more captures at the beginning of October.

On 11 December, Amazon was despatched to England with news that seven French ships of the line had arrived in Brest, while Phoebe was sent to apprise Vice-Admiral John Colpoys. The ships were part of the preparation for an invasion of Ireland, a joint plot between the French Directory and the Society of United Irishmen to establish a republic in the country. The French fleet left harbour, evading the British blockading fleet, and sailed for Bantry Bay. However, storms scattered them and most returned to France having accomplished very little. Early in January, Amazon and Indefatigable captured a French packet ship, Sangossee.

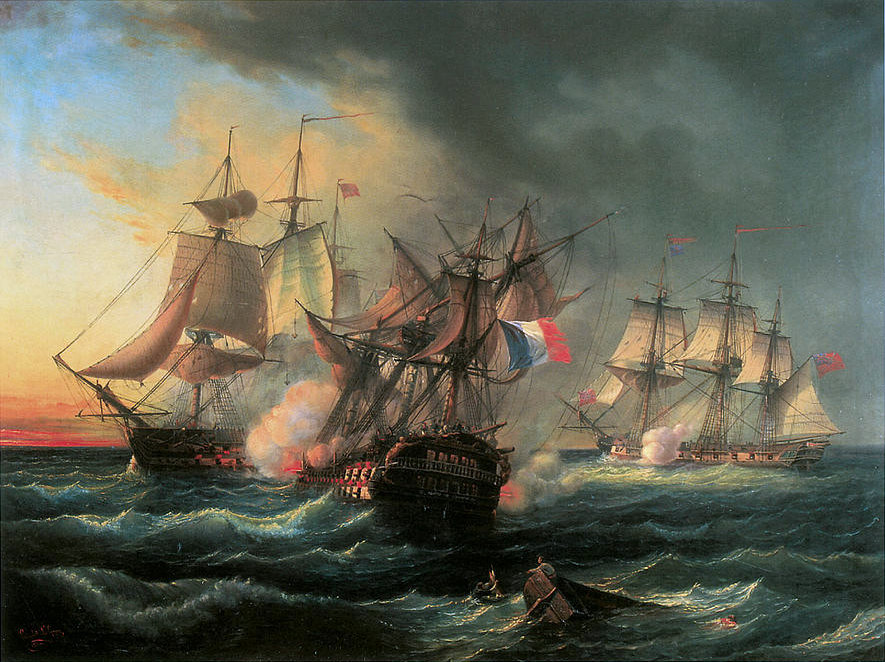
Amazon (right) and Indefatigable (left) fighting the Droits de l'Homme (centre), by Léopold Le Guen (1853)

The 74-gun French ship Droits de l'Homme, was returning from the failed expedition to Ireland, and in the ensuing action of 13 January 1797, Amazon, in company with Pellew's ship Indefatigable, encountered her off the coast of Brittany. Normally, frigates would not engage a ship of the line as they would be severely outgunned. However, there was a heavy sea and the French ship could not open her lower deck gunports for fear of flooding. This reduced her broadside considerably.

Pellew was 7 nmi (13 km) ahead of Amazon when he first attacked the Droits de l'Homme. An hour-and-a-half later Amazon came up and poured a broadside into the Frenchman's quarter. The two frigates attacked her from either side yawing to rake her while avoiding much of her return fire. At 04:00 on 14 January, land was suddenly sighted ahead and the frigates broke off the attack and headed in opposite directions. Amazon, going north, and more severely damaged, was unable to wear and ran aground at Audierne Bay, Isle Bas. Three crew had been killed during the battle and six more drowned, but the rest were able to reach shore. There the French captured them. The heavy seas pounding her on the beach destroyed Amazon; the Droits de l'Homme, badly damaged in the battle, was also wrecked, with heavy casualties.

The court martial on 29 September 1797, routinely held by the Navy after the loss of any vessel, honourably acquitted Reynolds and his officers of negligence in the loss of the ship.
