= French corvette Betzy (1793) =

History

France
- Name: Betzy
- Acquired: 22 May 1793 by capture
- Captured: 12 June 1796

General characteristics
- Tons burthen: 160? (bm)
- Complement: Privateer: 55; French Navy: 95
- Armament: Privateer: 10 guns; French Navy: 10 guns

Betzy was the Channel Islands brig Betsey that the French frigate Sémillante captured in May 1793, that the French Navy took into service, and that the Royal Navy recaptured in 1796.

== Career ==
One source describes Betzy/Betsy as a Guernsey privateer, and another source refers to her as a Jersey privateer. A British privateer captain aboard Sémillante described her as a Guernsey privateer of 10 guns and 55 men. The date of the capture was 22 May 1793. (Note: Captain Peter De Putron had acquired a letter of marque for the brig Betsey, of 160 tons (bm), twelve 4-pounder guns, and six swivel guns, on 17 April 1793.)

The French Navy put Betzy into service in July. In August she was under the command of enseigne de vaisseau Conseil and sailed to Brest. From February to May 1795 The Navy employed her as a convoy escort between Brest and Lorient. She was based at Audierne. She was under the command of enseigne de vaisseau Kerimel on 12 June 1796 when HMS Amazon captured her off Ushant.

Amazon was part of a frigate squadron under the command of Captain Sir Edward Pellew in HMS Indefatigable. The squadron sighted two French navy corvettes about eight leagues of Ushant and after a 24-hour chase succeeded in capturing both. One was Blonde, of ten guns and 95 men, and the other was Trois Couleurs, of ten guns and 70 men. They were provisioned for a six-week cruise, and two days out of Brest but had captured nothing. Amazon shared the prize money with the rest of the squadron. The prize money notice referred to "La Blonde, alias Le Betsey".

The Royal Navy did not take Betsey into service.
