= French frigate Diligente (1761) =

History

France
- Name: Diligente
- Builder: Lorient, plans by Groignard
- Laid down: December 1755
- Launched: 28 April 1756
- In service: April 1761
- Fate: Wrecked off Cape Henry in January 1782

General characteristics
- Displacement: 1000 tonneaux
- Tons burthen: 470 port tonneaux
- Length: 39.6 metres
- Beam: 10.3 metres
- Depth of hold: 4.7 metres
- Armament: Pierced for 26 guns

Diligente was a 26-gun frigate of the French Navy. Originally built for the French East India Company, she was purchased by the Navy and took part in the War of American Independence.

== Career ==
Diligente was built at Lorient as an East Indiaman for the French East India Company, and was completed in December 1756. She departed for her first journey on 31.

On 26 March 1761, she arrived in Brest, returning from her second journey to India. The next month, the Navy purchased her and commissioned her as a frigate.

In 1776, she was under Lieutenant Amblimont, part on the escadre d'évolution under Duchaffault.

In September 1778, she took part in the Invasion of Dominica, along with the frigates Tourterelle and Amphitrite, and the corvette French corvette Étourdie (1762). She later took part in the French invasion of Saint Martin on 29 February 1779 under Du Chilleau.

In late September and October 1780 the French frigates Aimable (26 guns) and Diligente, were escorting a convoy from Rochefort to Bayonne. On her way they captured three British cutters: Alert, of 18 guns, captured 25 September 1780; Tartar, a privateer of 12 guns; and Jersey, of 12 guns. The French took Alert and Jersey into service, Alerte as Alerte.

Diligentewas at the Battle of Fort Royal on 29 April and 30 April 1781, under Mortemart.

In September, she ferried troops to support the Siege of Yorktown.

== Fate ==
Diligente was wrecked at Cape Henry in January 1782.
