= Auspicious (1797 ship) =

Great Britain
- Name: Auspicious
- Owner: 1797:S. Baker; 1803:Robert Lawson; 1819:D. McDonald & Co.
- Builder: W. J. Bottomley, King's Lynn
- Launched: 1797
- Fate: Sold 1821

General characteristics
- Tons burthen: 400, or 404, or 40439/94, or 422, or 426, or 438, or 462, or 492 (bm)
- Length: Overall:106 ft 4 1/2 in (32.4 m); Keel:83 ft 10 3/3 in (25.6 m)
- Beam: 30 ft 1 1/4 in (9.2 m)
- Depth of hold: 12 ft 4 in (3.8 m)
- Complement: 1797:32; 1804:40
- Armament: 1797:12 × 6-pounder guns; 1804:16 × 12-pounder carronades
- Notes: Three decks

Auspicious was built in 1797. The British East India Company (EIC), chartered her for a voyage to Bengal and back. At Calcutta a fire almost destroyed her. She was rebuilt there some years later. She served as a transport vessel in the British government's expedition to the Red Sea in 1801. She then sailed to England, again under charter to the EIC. In 1811 she sailed to Bengal to remain. She was sold in 1821 either to Malabars or Arabs.

== Career ==
Auspacious entered Lloyd's Register in 1797 with S. Falker, master, changing to D. Merrylees. Her owner was S. Baker, and her first voyage was Lynn–London. Her trade then changed to London–India.

The EIC engaged Auspicious as an "extra ship" and had her measured and surveyed by Cox. Captain David Merrylees (or Mirrylees) acquired a letter of marque on 8 April 1797. On 7 May he sailed for Bengal.

A fire aboard Auspicious at Calcutta on 18 July 1797 almost destroyed her. She was preparing to sail back to London and had about 400 tons of goods on board. None of the cargo belonged to the EIC. Auspicious was rebuilt at Sulkea. The rebuilding apparently took place in 1801.

The British government hired a number of transport vessels to support Major-General Sir David Baird's expedition in 1801 to the Red Sea. Baird was in command of the Indian army that was going to Egypt to help General Ralph Abercromby expel the French there. Baird landed at Kosseir, on the Egyptian side of the Red Sea. He then led his troops army across the desert to Kena on the Nile, and then to Cairo. He arrived in time for the battle of Alexandria. Captain Hardie of Shah Kaikusroo was appointed Commodore of the fleet of country ships, Auspicious among them.

In 1803 Auspicious was recorded as being registered at Calcutta. Her master was John Barker, and her owner Robert Lawson.

Captain John Baker sailed from Calcutta on 26 March 1803, bound for England. On 21 May Auspicious was at Sagar Island, and on 29 June Penang. She reached Saint Helena on 12 October. Lloyd's List reported that Auspicious, Barker, master, from Bengal, had lost her anchor and two cables in Margate Roads. She arrived at Deptford on 27 December.

In England Captain John Barker acquired a letter of marque on 14 March 1804. On 4 April Auspicious paid £3315 7s 8d for fitting out and provisioning for her return voyage to Bengal.

In 1809 Auspicious' master was Robert Lawson and her owner John Ferguson.

Auspicious, Hugh Atkins Reid, owner, appeared on a list of vessels registered at Calcutta in January 1811. Later that year she underwent fitting in England at a cost of £1851 13s 9d. She then sailed to Bengal to remain, arriving there on 4 February 1812. Lloyd's List reported on 28 August that Auspicious had put into Cape Town to repair some trifling damage from a lightning strike. Auspicious underwent a good repair and a thorough repair in 1813.

In 1819 Auspicious was registered at Calcutta with D. McDonald & Co, owner, and J. Neish, master.

== Fate ==
In January 1821 her owners sold Auspicious to Arabs, or Malabars.

The issues of Lloyd's Register and the Register of Shipping for 1822 (i.e., published after her sale but before the news of it reached England, provide useful information, though some of it is contradictory.

Year	Master	Owner	Trade	Source
1822	Neish	M'Donald	London–India	Lloyd's Register
1822	J. Neish	Reid	London–India	Register of Shipping

Lloyd's Register gives her origin as Newcastle and her burthen as 492 tons, apparently somewhat conflating the present Auspicious with an Auspicious of 463 tons (bm), launched at Newcastle in 1799 and wrecked in 1801. The Register of Shipping gives the present Auspicious's origin as Lynn, but gives a launch year of 1796. Both sources provide some useful data on interim repairs.
