= French frigate Aimable =

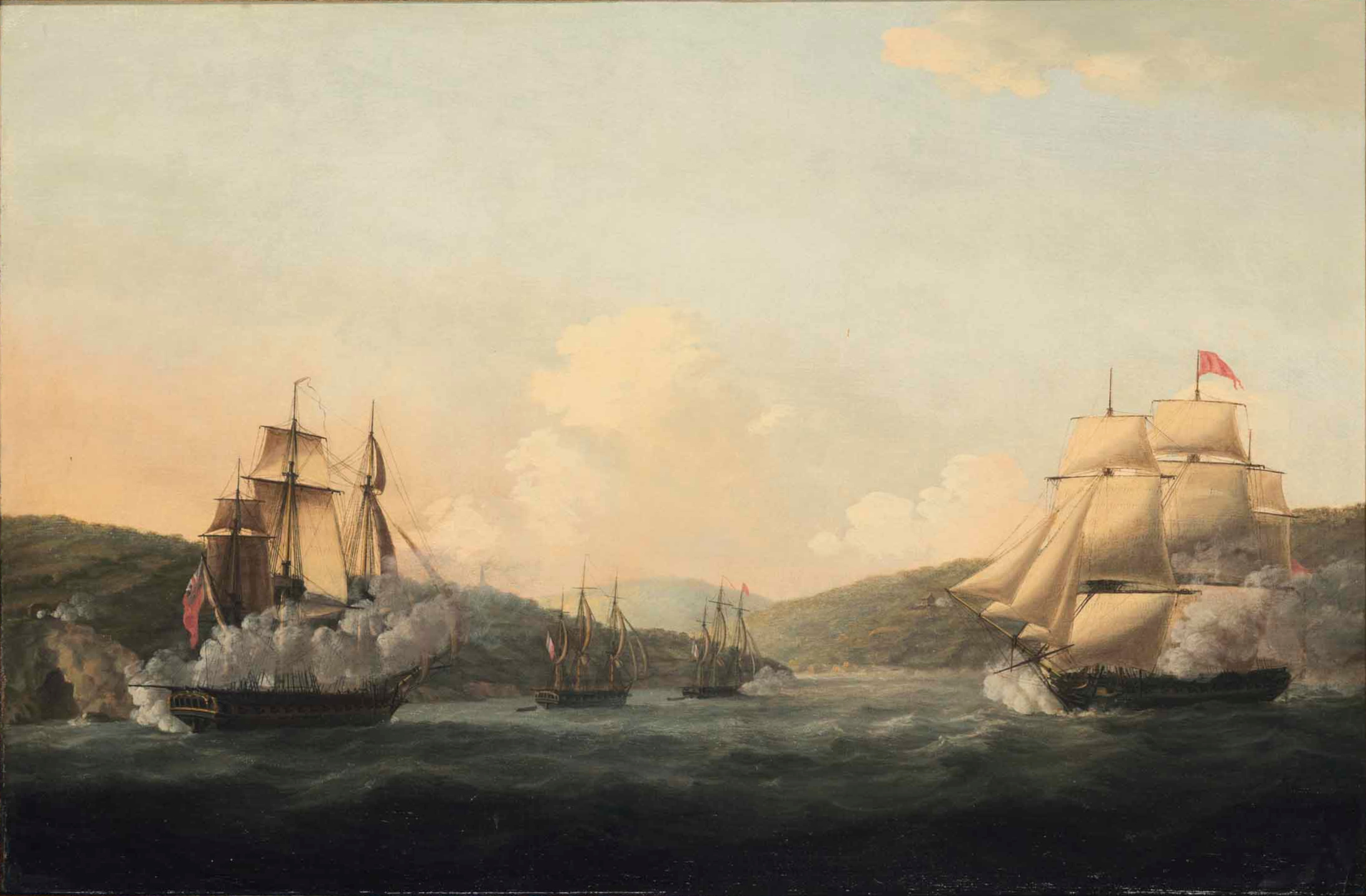
- The capture of the 32-gun French frigate Amiable and the corvette Ceres after their encounter with Sir Samuel Hood in the Barfleur, with the Valiant and the Magnificent, in the Mona Passage, 19 April 1782

History

France
- Name: Aimable
- Ordered: 5 May 1755
- Builder: Toulon
- Laid down: 1775
- Launched: 20 July 1776
- Captured: 19 April 1782

Great Britain
- Name: HMS Aimable
- Fate: Broken up in 1814

General characteristics
- Class & type: Alcmène-class
- Type: frigate
- Displacement: 966 tonneaux
- Tons burthen: 500 port tonneaux
- Length: 41 metres
- Beam: 10.8 metres
- Depth of hold: 4.9 metres
- Propulsion: Sails
- Armament: 26 × 8-pounder long guns

Aimable was an Alcmène-class 26-gun frigate of the French Navy.

== Career ==
Aimable took part in the Battle of Rhode Island, where she helped corner HMS Cerberus and Lark and force their crew to scuttle them. On 8 October 1781, she departed Rochefort with Iphigénie, in a division under Captain Kersaint, to take part in the Capture of Demerara and Essequibo.

In late September and October 1780 the French frigates Aimable and Diligente, were escorting a convoy from Rochefort to Bayonne. On her way they captured three British cutters: Alert, of 18 guns, captured 25 September 1780; Tartar, a privateer of 12 guns; and Jersey, of 12 guns. The French took Alert and Jersey into service.

Aimable took part in the Battle of the Saintes on 12 April 1782. On 19 April, ships from Hood's squadron captured her during the Battle of the Mona Passage. The British recommissioned her as HMS Aimable.

In December 1799, Aimable and Glenmore were escorting the West India convoy from Cork. On 17 December they encountered the French frigate Sirène, Citoyen Reignaud, captain, and French corvette Bergère, which were sailing to France from Cayenne. Bergère was carrying Victor Hugues as a passenger. The French vessels had with them the East Indiaman Calcutta, which they had captured the same morning; René Lemarant de Kerdaniel was captain of the prize crew on Calcutta. Glenmore recaptured Calcutta while Aimable engaged Sirène and Bergère. A 35-minute action ensued before the two French vessels departed. Sirène had as prisoners Captain Haggy, Calcutta's master, her first and second mates, and 50 of her lascars and seamen. Calcutta arrived in Plymouth on 12 January 1800. On 18 January 50 lascars were landed from Calcutta and taken to China House, which served as a hospital. The lascars were sick and suffering from the cold.
