= Cecilia (1790 ship) =

History

Great Britain
- Name: Cecilia or Cæcilia (Note: Circa 1800 the spelling with "æ" was more common than the alternative.)
- Owner: 1797: Lambert & Co.; 1800:Prinsep; 1802:Lambert, Ross, and Co.
- Builder: Pegu, or Surat, or Bombay, or Calcutta (Bengal)
- Launched: 1787, or 1790
- Fate: Wrecked 9 January 1804

General characteristics
- Tons burthen: 180; 475, or 478, or 550, or 575 (bm)
- Sail plan: Full-rigged ship
- Armament: 1797:10 × 6-pounder guns; 1800:12 × 6-pounder guns
- Notes: Teak-built three-decker

Cecilia (or Cæcilia) was launched in 1790, possibly at Pegu, Surat, Bombay, or Calcutta. She transferred to British registry in 1797 after sailing there under charter to the British East India Company (EIC). She made one more voyage for the EIC and was wrecked in January 1804.

== Career ==
First EIC voyage (1796): Cecilia was under the command of Captain E. H. Palmer and at Calcutta on 18 February 1796. She was at Saugor on 5 March, St Augustine's Bay on 20 June, the Cape of Good Hope on 31 August, and St Helena on 17 September. She was also at Crookhaven on 26 November, and she arrived at Long Reach on 16 December.

Cæcilia first appeared in Lloyd's Register in 1797 with Palmer, master, Lambert, owner, and Calcutta as place of build. Her trade was London—India. She was admitted to the Registry of Great Britain on 17 February 1797.

In 1800, Cæcilia's master was Thomas Thomas, and her trade was that of London-based transport.

HMS Harpy arrived at Portsmouth on 26 May 1800, prior to escorting Cecilia to "a certain latitude", Cecilia would then sail on to Bengal.

The government engaged Cecilia as a transport to support General Sir David Baird's expedition to the Red Sea, which in turn had the objective of supporting General Sir Ralph Abercrombie at the battle of Alexandria.

The New Oriental Register... for 1802 gave her owner as Lambert, Ross, & Co., and her master as Captain Thomas Thomas.

Second EIC voyage (1803): Captain Thomas Thomas left Calcutta on 28 November 1802, and passed Saugor on 28 January 1803, bound for England. Cecilia reached St Helena on 15 April, and arrived at Deptford on 9 June.

== Fate ==
Cecilia sailed on 5 December 1803, for Bengal, under the command of Captain Carrol. On 9 January 1804, she was wrecked at Madeira in a gale, and her third and fourth officers drowned. She dragged her anchors and became wedged between two rocks. When her main mast over on the landward side passengers and crew used it as a bridge. During the following night the sea completely destroyed her.
