= Joseph Tucker (Royal Navy official) =

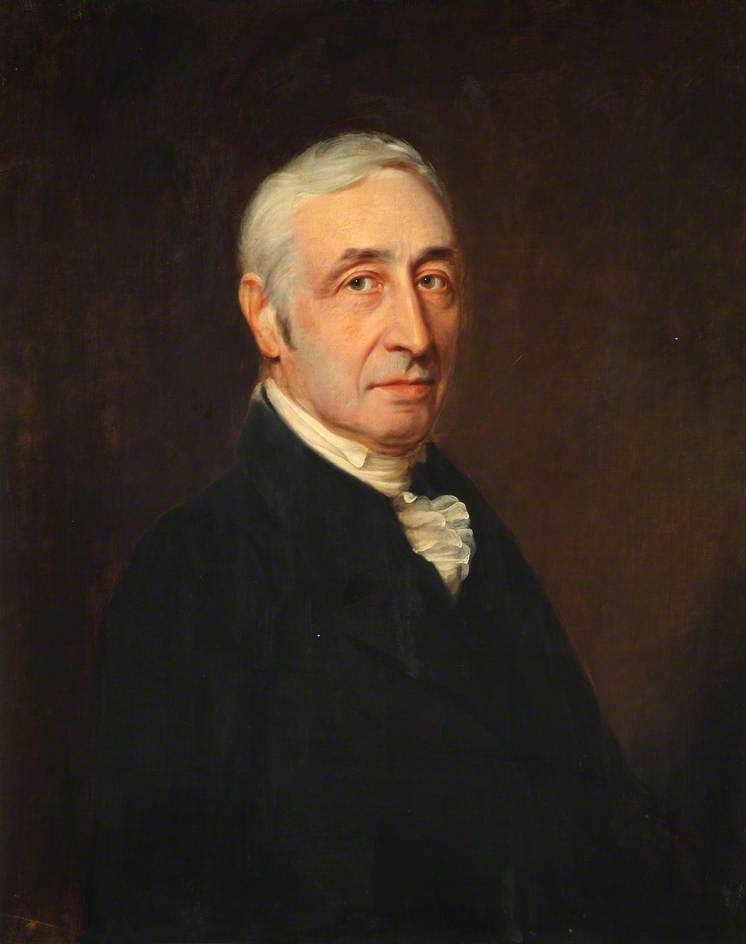
Portrait of Joseph Tucker, c. 1815

Joseph Tucker (c. 1760 – 1838) was joint Surveyor of the Navy alongside Robert Seppings from 1813 until his retirement in 1831.

== Biography ==
Tucker was the son of Benjamin Tucker, of Crediton, Devon by his wife Rachel (née Lyne, of that family of Liskeard, and a cousin of Stephens Lyne-Stephens, considered at one time to be England's richest commoner) and brother of another Benjamin Tucker (1762-1829), of Trematon Castle, who served as Surveyor General for Cornwall and Second Secretary to the Admiralty, having previously served as secretary to the Earl St Vincent throughout his service in the Mediterranean. The Tucker family can be traced back to John Tucker, of Tavistock, Devon, who was living in the reign of Edward IV; his son and heir, Stephen, was subject to physical infirmities, and was accordingly granted by Henry VII, in a formal declaration, the right to wear his hat in the King's presence.

Tucker was appointed master shipwright of the Plymouth Dockyard in 1802. Having been appointed a Commissioner, in 1814, alongside Sir George Wood of the Royal Engineers and Admiral T. B. Martin, Tucker went to Antwerp to superintend the partition of the fleet and naval stores of the arsenal established there.

In 1809, Tucker designed a 170-gun ship with five tiers of guns, to be called the Duke of Kent; it was however never constructed. The National Maritime Museum states this was how he was best known.

Tucker married Jane A'Court; their third son, John Scott Tucker, married Unity Isabella, daughter of Lt Henry Hire, R.N., who served in the Mediterranean and commanded the convict ship at Bermuda, and one of their five daughters, Jane A'Court Tucker, married Robert Willis, of Mecklenburgh Square, London. One of their sons was Sir William Willis, Accountant-General of the Navy; William's second son, John Willis, was Bishop of Uganda from 1912 to 1934.

Tucker died in Mecklenburgh Square, London, on 23 November 1838.
