= HMS Sparrow (1796) =

Cutter of the Royal Navy

History

Great Britain
- Name: Rattler
- Namesake: Rattlesnake
- Launched: 1780
- Honours and awards: Naval General Service Medal (NGSM) with clasp "Glorious First of June"
- Fate: Sold to the Royal Navy in 1796

Great Britain
- Name: Rattler
- Acquired: 1796 by purchase
- Renamed: HMS Sparrow
- Fate: Broken up 1805

General characteristics
- Tons burthen: 123, or 12370/94, or 12310/94, (bm)
- Length: Overall: 66 ft 3 in (20.2 m); Keel: 66 ft 6 in (20.3 m)
- Beam: 22 ft 3 3/4 in (6.8 m)
- Depth of hold: 8 ft 9 3/4 in (2.7 m)
- Sail plan: Cutter
- Complement: Privateer: 41; Royal navy cutter:40,
- Armament: Privateer: 10 × 4-pounder guns; Hired armed cutter: 10 × 4-pounder guns; Royal navy cutter: 10 × 12-pounder carronades + 2 6-pounder guns,

HMS Sparrow was launched in 1780, almost surely under another name. She first appears in 1793 in readily accessible records as the privateer cutter Rattler. The British Admiralty hired her and employed her as HM Hired armed cutter Rattler. During this time she was present at the largest naval battle of the French Revolutionary Wars. The Navy purchased her in 1796 for the Royal Navy and renamed her HMS Sparrow. She was sold for breaking up in 1805.

== Rattler ==
Although records report that she was launched in 1780, she at no times appeared under that name in Lloyd's Register, suggesting that she may have been launched under another name. She first appeared in 1793 when Captain Robert Griggs acquired a letter of marque on 30 April, shortly after the outbreak of war with France.

The Navy hired Rattler on 6 April 1793. Under the command of Lieutenant J.Wynne she was present at the battle of the Glorious First of June. In 1847 the Admiralty awarded the NGSM with clasp "Glorious First of June" to all the surviving claimants from the action.

Rattler's contract ended on 8 February 1796.

== HMS Sparrow ==
The Admiralty purchased Rattler in 1796. There being a HMS Rattler in service, it renamed the cutter Rattler Sparrow. The Navy commissioned Sparrow in July under Lieutenant John Cornet Pears. On 2 October he captured Coureur, Peter de Lang, master. Courier, Large, master, from Rotterdam, arrived at Plymouth the next day.

In 1797 HMS Tartar and Sparrow captured two French privateers, each of six guns: Resolu and Revanche. Various other sources give the date of capture of Resolue or Revanche (or Resource, as 30 June or 1 July, but by that time Tartar had been lost. Head money for the crews of the privateers was paid on 13 January 1838.

On 1 April Tartar grounded on a sandbank off Puerto Plata, filled with water, and had to be abandoned. Sparrow and the prizes took off the crew.

On 19 August 1797 the French privateer Rencontre, Captain Lenau, seized the American brig Harriot and put a prize crew on board. Two days later, Sparrow, Lieutenant Hugh Wylie, captured Harriot, and sent her for Cape Nicola Mole. The next day the French privateer Enfant Trouve, Captain Pierre Brard, captured Harriot and sent her into Port-de-Paix. The court at the Cape condemned vessel and cargo in prize on 3 September. The Court found that as Harriot had been in British hands for 26 hours, and as the British didn't respect the rights of neutrals, and as retaking Harriot had involved a hard fighting against the British, Harriot was a lawful prize. The loss to John Holmes, owner of the cargo, inclusive of the cost of insurance, was US$4,587.50.

In 1799 Sparrow was still on the Jamaica station and still under Wylie's command. On 30 March a party of seamen and marines from Trent stormed a five-gun battery overlooking a small bay about seven leagues northward of Cabo Rojo, Puerto Rico. As the landing party destroyed the battery, boats from Trent captured a Spanish ship and schooner sheltering under the battery's guns. Their crews scuttled two other schooners in the bay. Sparrow was able to get into shallower water than Trent and so provided during the operation. British casualties were only three men wounded.

During the period 26 June 1799 and 21 July, Sparrow captured a French schooner of four guns (pierced for 14). The schooner was sailing from Cape François to Europe with a cargo of coffee and cocoa.

During the period 21 July and 27 October, Sparrow captured three prizes:

- A Spanish Schooner from Porto Rico, supposedly bound for Jamaica with a cargo of cotton. Sparrow took her for carrying 2400 dollars not on her Bill of Lading.
- The brig Nancy, under the American flag, from Curacoa to Aux Cayes. Sparrow took Nancy as she was going into Jacmel.
- A Dutch schooner from Anacoa to Mangirane. She was carrying provisions and "Russian Duck". (Russian duck is a canvas cloth made of fine white linen.)

When Michael Fitton, captain of the schooner Ferret, tender to HMS Abergavenny, cruised the Mona Passage in company with Sparrow, commanded by Mr. Whylie, the two accidentally separated for a few days. On rejoining, Fitton invited Whylie by signal to come to breakfast, and while waiting caught a large shark that was under the stern. In its stomach was found a packet of papers relating to an American brig Nancy. When Whylie came on board, he mentioned that he had detained an American brig called Nancy. Fitton then said that he had her papers. 'Papers?' answered Whylie; 'why, I sealed up her papers and sent them in with her.' 'Just so,' replied Fitton; 'those were her false papers; here are her real ones.' And so it proved. The papers were lodged in the Admiralty Court at Port Royal, and by them the brig was condemned. The shark's jaws were set up on shore, with the inscription, 'Lieut. Fitton recommends these jaws for a collar for neutrals to swear through.' The papers were preserved in the museum of the Royal United Service Institution. (Note: Navy records mention the capture as involving an action on 28 July. However, fuller, if slightly less colourful, accounts of the incident exist. The capture of Nancy occurred on 28 August, and there is no mention of any exchange of fire. The court condemned her on 28 November.)

Between 27 October 1799 and 20 February 1800, Sparrow took four prizes:

- French Schooner Lean: Sparrow took 2,200 dollars out of her and then scuttled her as she was of no value;
- French Schooner Lean Pierre, carrying coffee: Sparrow took 2,100 dollars out of her
- Spanish sloop carrying salt; and,
- Spanish sloop Nelson, carrying tobacco, pork, mules, and 400 dollars.

Between 9 March 1800 and 20 March, Sparrow captured a Spanish brig carrying mules and fustic.

== Fate ==
Sparrow was broken up in 1805.
