= Victurnien-Henri-Elzéar de Rochechouart de Mortemart =

Victurnien-Henri-Elzéar de Rochechouart de Mortemart (Paris, 11 July 1756 — Port-au-Prince, 17 March 1783) was a French Navy officer. He served in the War of American Independence, and became a member of the Society of the Cincinnati.

== Biography ==
Mortemart joined the Navy as a Garde-Marine in 1771. He took part in the several cruises with the escadre d'évolution, and was promoted to Lieutenant March 1779.

In 1779, Mortemart was given command of the 26-gun frigate Aigrette, part of the squadron under Orvilliers. He then transferred to Diligente, on which he captured two British ships and took part in the Battle of Fort Royal on 29 April and 30 April 1781.

In 1781, he captained Aigrette in the squadron under Grasse. He took part in the Battle of the Chesapeake on 5 September 1781, and in the subsequent Siege of Yorktown. On 11 September 1781, along with Aigrette, under Traversay, he took part in the capture of HMS Iris and Richmond, which the French Navy took in service as Richemond.

Mortemart was given command of Richemond, which he captained at the Battle of the Saintes in 12 April 1782, where she attempted to tow Glorieux to safety before being ordered to retreat.

Mortemart was then tasked with bringing the news of the battle to Versailles. He was then promoted to Captain, aged just 25, and given command of the 40-gun frigate Nymphe, to cruise off Martinique with the 32-gun Amphitrite. On 17 February 1781, they captured the 44-gun HMS Argo off Tortola. The 74-gun HMS Invincible recaptured Argo shortly afterwards.

Mortemart died of a sudden illness on 17 March 1783.

== Sources and references ==
Notes

Bibliography

- Contenson, Ludovic (1934). La Société des Cincinnati de France et la guerre d'Amérique (1778-1783). Paris: éditions Auguste Picard. OCLC 7842336.
- Courcelles, Jean B. (1827). Histoire généalogique et héraldique des pairs de France, des grands dignitaires de la couronne, des principales familles nobles du royaume, et des maisons princières de l'Europe: précédé de la généalogie de la maison de France (in French). Vol. 8. Bertrand. p. 193.
- Kerguelen, Yves-Joseph (1796). Relation des combats et des évènements de la guerre maritime de 1778 entre la France et l'Angleterre (in French). Imprimerie de Patris. OCLC 15264572.
- Lacour-Gayet, Georges (1905). La marine militaire de la France sous le règne de Louis XVI. Paris: Honoré Champion. OCLC 763372623.
- Michaud, Louis-Gabriel (1843). Biographie universelle ancienne et moderne : histoire par ordre alphabétique de la vie publique et privée de tous les hommes (in French). Vol. 29. Paris: C. Desplaces. p. 370—371.
- Roche, Jean-Michel (2005). Dictionnaire des bâtiments de la flotte de guerre française de Colbert à nos jours. Vol. 1. Group Retozel-Maury Millau. ISBN 978-2-9525917-0-6. OCLC 165892922.
- Troude, Onésime-Joachim (1867). Batailles navales de la France (in French). Vol. 2. Challamel ainé. OCLC 836362484.

External links

- Archives nationales (2011). "Fonds Marine, sous-série B/4: Campagnes, 1571-1785" (PDF).
