= William Rule (Surveyor of the Navy) =

British shipbuilder

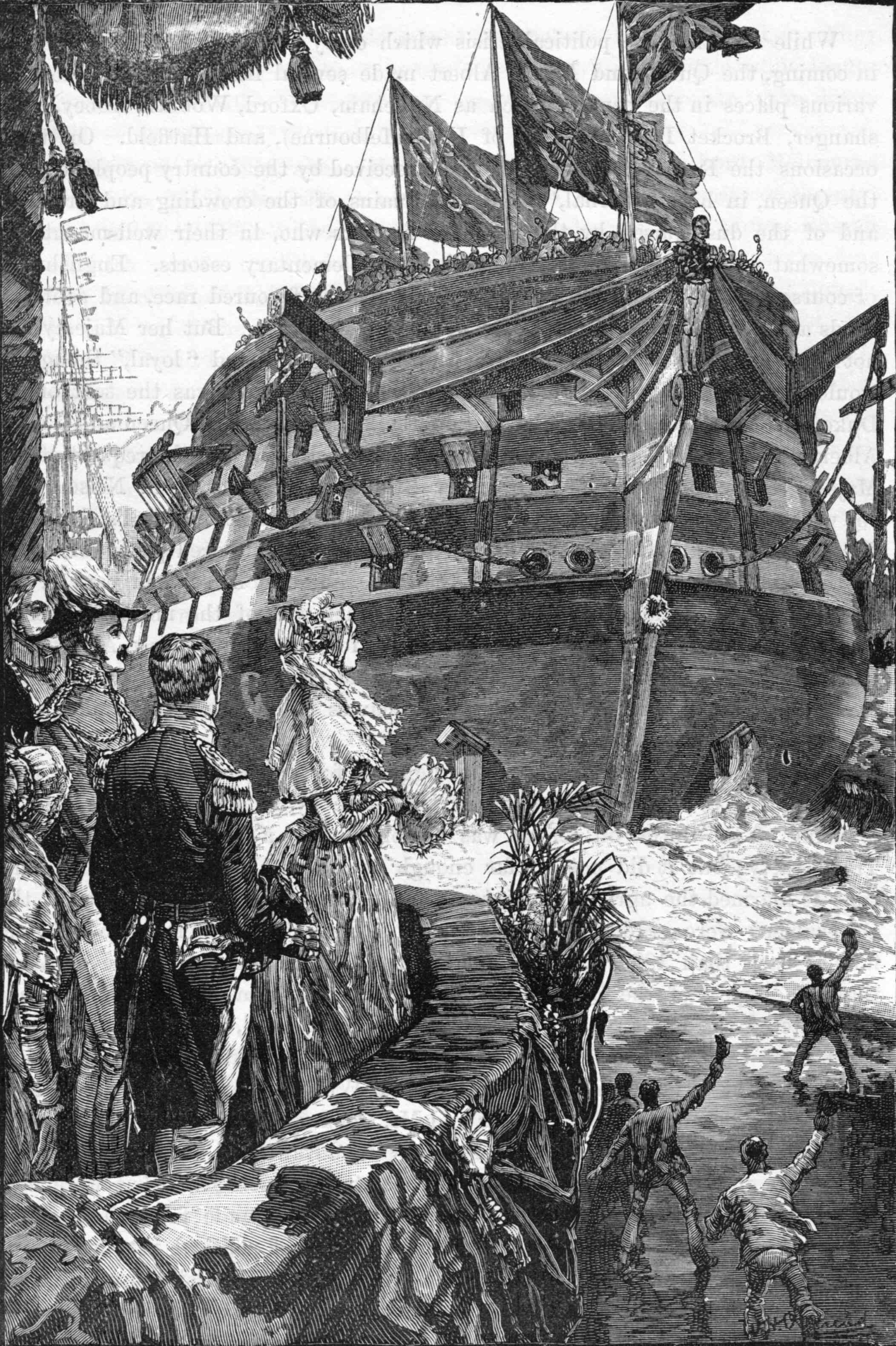
Launch of HMS Trafalgar (Caledonia class)

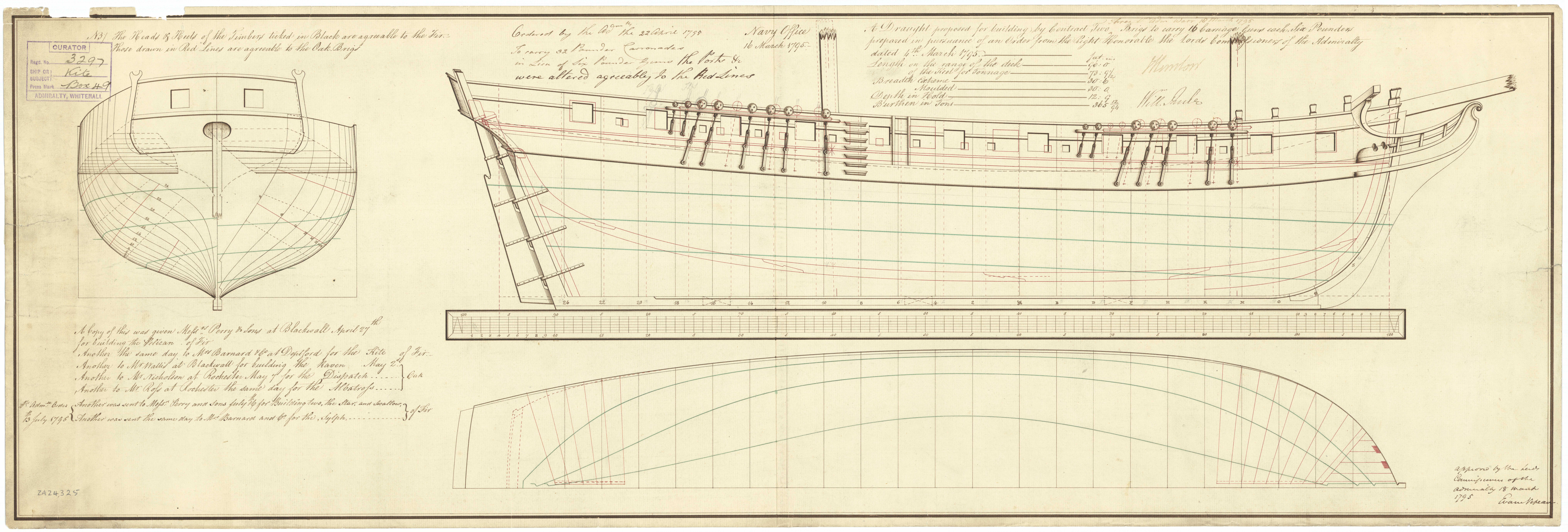
Rule's drawing for the Albatross class

Sir William Rule (c. 1750–1816) was a shipbuilder and designer to the Royal Navy who rose to be Surveyor of the Navy.

Designing during the Napoleonic Wars, many of his ships took place in several critical battles, including the Nile, Trafalgar, and Copenhagen.

== Life ==
He was born in south England around 1750.

He first appears in Royal Navy records in April 1778 as a master mastmaker at Woolwich Dockyard; however, this position infers both an apprenticeship as a ship's carpenter and a period in the dockyards as a standard mastmaker. In September 1778 he was promoted to master boatbuilder at Portsmouth Dockyard.

In February 1779 he moved to Sheerness Dockyard, first as master shipwright then as master caulker. By 1787 he was assistant master shipwright at Portsmouth Dockyard, and in March of that year was appointed master shipwright back at Sheerness Dockyard, thereafter having overall charge of all ships constructed there, and from this point the Royal Navy list the ships built under his charge.

In August 1790 he moved to Woolwich as master shipwright, and in February 1793 he was appointed Surveyor of the Navy, working alongside Sir John Henslow. In June 1806 Henslow retired and from then Rule worked with Henry Peake.

In June 1813 Rule was replaced as Surveyor of the Navy by Joseph Tucker and Robert Seppings (jointly) apparently due to Rule's ill-health.

Rule died in 1816, his will being read on 29 February 1816. The will is held at the National Archives in Kew.

== Ships built ==
- HMS Leopard (1790) 50-gun ship of the line
- HMS Martin (1790) 16-gun sloop
- HMS Minotaur (1793) 74-gun ship of the line with a colourful history

== Ships designed ==
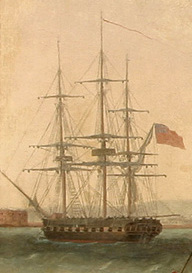
HMS Euryalus

Note: dates in brackets represent date of design not launch)

- Amazon-class frigate (1795) four 36-gun frigates
- Caledonia-class ship of the line (1794) nine huge 120-gun ships of the line
- Merlin-class sloop (1795)
- Albatross-class brig-sloop (1795) eight 18-gun brigs
- HMS Dragon (1795) 74-gun ship of the line
- HMS Acasta (1795) 40-gun frigate
- HMS Naiad (1795) 38-gun frigate
- Amphion-class frigate (1796) a number of 32-gun frigates
- Snake-class ship-sloop (1796) a number of 18-gun sloops
- Cruizer-class brig-sloop (1796) a number of 16-gun sloops
- Courser-class gunboat (1797) a number of 12-gun gunboats
- HMS Osprey (1797) 18-gun sloop
- Apollo-class frigate (1798) twenty-seven 36-gun frigates
- HMS Plantagenet (1798) 74-gun ship of the line
- Lively-class frigate (1799) sixteen 38-gun frigates
- Repulse-class ship of the line (1800) a series of eleven 74-gun ships of the line
- HMS Ethalion (1800) 38-gun frigate
- Archer-class gun-brig (1800) 12-gun gun-brig
- HMS Euryalus (1801) 36-gun frigate
- HMS Impregnable (1802) 98-gun ship of the line eventually launched in 1810
- Confounder-class gun-brig (1804) a series of 12-gun gun-brigs
- HMS Bulwark (1804) 74-gun ship of the line
- HMS Seagull (1805) 16-gun sloop
- Banterer-class post ship (1805) a series of six 22-gun post ships
- HMS Horatio (1805) 38-gun frigate
- HMS Bucephalus (1806) 32-gun frigate
- HMS Tuscan (1808) 16-gun sloop
- Decoy-class cutter (1809) three 10-gun cutters
- Salisbury-class ship of the line (1810) a series of 50-gun ships of the line
- HMS Bacchante (1810) 38-gun frigate
- Bold-modified Confounder-class gun-brig (1811) a series of 12-gun gun-brigs
- HMS Forte (1811) 38-gun frigate
- HMS Jupiter (1811) 50-gun ship of the line
- HMS Teazer (1811) 12-gun sloop
- HMS Creole (1811) 36-gun frigate
- Scamander-class frigate (1812) a series of ten 36-gun frigates
- Cyrus-class ship-sloop (1812) a series of sixteen 20-gun flush-desk post-ships
- Conway-class post ship (1813) a series of ten 20-gun post-ships
- HMS Acute (1813) 12-gun brig
- HMS Snapper (1813) 12-gun gun-brig
- HMS Trafalgar (1813) huge 106-gun ship of the line (later renamed Camperdown)
- HMS Leander (1813) 58-gun frigate
- HMS Bold (1812 or 1813) 12-gun gun-brig
- Favorite-class sloop (1813) a series of 18-gun sloops
- HMS Griper (1813) 12-gun gun-brig
- HMS Adder (1813) 12-gun gun-brig
- HMS Havock (date unclear) 12-gun gun-brig
- HMS Pelican (date unclear) 16-gun sloop
