= René Lemarant de Kerdaniel =

René Lemarant de Kerdaniel (French pronunciation: [ʁəne ləmaʁɑ̃ də kɛʁdanjɛl]; 10 August 1777, in Lorient – 4 October 1862 in Paris) was a French naval officer who rose to the rank of admiral.

== Career ==
=== French Revolution ===
Born to the family of an administrator of the Navy, Lemarant joined the Navy as a boy in 1790, aged just 13. He sailed on Rhône, which was wrecked on Toulinguet rock; (Note: Rhône was a gabarre (transport), of 350 tons (French; displacement), launched on 21 July 1781. She was the name-ship of her two-ship class of gabarres.) the crew was rescued only after twenty-seven hours. He then transferred to the frigate Réunion. He later served on the flûte Barbeau, which later ferried troops to San Domingo. (Note: Barbeau was a Dromadaire-class fluyt, launched in 1782 and wrecked in the West Indies in October 1791.)

Back at Lorient on 25 June 1793, Lemarant studied to be admitted as a naval student 2nd class. After passing the exam on 1 May 1794, he was appointed to Montagne, Villaret de Joyeuse's flagship. On Montagne he took part in the Third Battle of Ushant, where he was promoted to student 1st class. He then transferred to the frigate Fraternité, under contre-amiral Joseph-Marie Nielly.

In 1796, Lemarant was appointed to command the lugger Surveillante, a captured British privateer.

On 7 July 1797, he was promoted to ensign, and transferred to Sirène. The frigate sailed to Cayenne, and on 17 December 1799 on her journey back captured HMS Calcutta, a former East Indiaman. Lemarant was given command of the prize, but HMS Glenmore chased Calcutta and recaptured her the same day. Lemarant was taken to England and spent four months on a hulk in Chatham, before being sent back to France on parole. The Peace of Amiens freed him from the parole.

Lemarant was then appointed to command the corvette French corvette Berceau, bound for Martinique. In 1803, he carried the news that the War of the Third Coalition had broken out. He stayed in the Indian Ocean until August 1804, before returning to France, where he was notified of his promotion to Lieutenant on 26 October 1803.

=== First Empire ===
In late 1804, he was appointed to the 74-gun Héros, on which he took part in the Battle of Trafalgar.

In July 1808, Lemarant de Kerdaniel was promoted to Commander, and served as an aid to minister Denis Decrès.

In 1809, he took command of the Astrée and sailed to Île de France to reinforce the frigate squadron under Hamelin, where he witnesses the last stages of the Battle of Grand Port and helped sealing the fate of the last remaining British frigate. With the freshly captured Iphigénie, the Astrée, as well as the corvette Victor and the brig Entreprenant, Lemarant sailed to patrol off Ile Bourbon, notably taking part in the capture of HMS Africaine in the action of 13 September 1810. After the Invasion of Île de France, in line with the terms of capitulation, he was sent back to France by the British.

On 20 December 1810, Lemarant was promoted to Captain. On 1 February, he was appointed to the command of Marengo.

=== Bourbon Restoration ===
At the Bourbon Restoration, Marengo was used as a troop ship to ferry the soldiers that were to take back possession of Martinique and Guadeloupe.

Back to Brest in 1815, Lemarant refused to take any part in the Hundred Days, but was nevertheless sidelined by the Bourbons until 1817, when he was given command of Hector. He later commanded the frigate Cléopâtre in a squadron under contre-amiral Duperré.

In 1823, captaining the frigate Guerrière, he cruised off Spain during the invasion by the Hundred Thousand Sons of Saint Louis. On 9 August, he was sent off Algeciras with Galathée, taking part in the capture of the city, and later in the capture of Cadix. At the end of the campaign, he was promoted to contre-amiral and made a Baron in reward of his conduct.

In 1826, he commanded the Brazil station on Surveillante, where he stayed until 1829.

In 1831, he was made Préfet maritime of Cherbourg, and was promoted to vice-amiral on 22 January 1836. In 1842, he entered the Council of the Admiralty, and became its vice-president.

In 1845, having reached the retirement age, he was put in the reserve.

René Lemarant de Kerdaniel died in Paris on 4 October 1862.

== Honours ==
- Grand officer of the Legion of Honour.
- Knight of the Order of Saint Louis.
