= Gabriel (1794 ship) =

British ship

History

Great Britain
- Name: Gabriel
- Owner: Hamilton & Co.
- Builder: Gabriel Gillett, Calcutta, Calcutta
- Launched: 24 September 1794
- Fate: Wrecked 8 September 1801

General characteristics
- Tons burthen: 815, or 81514/94, or 867, or 878 (bm)
- Propulsion: Sail
- Armament: 20 × 6-pounder guns + 2 × 18-pounder carronades
- Notes: Two decks; teak-built

Gabriel was a country ship launched in 1794 at Calcutta. She traded east of the Cape of Good Hope, except for at least two voyages for the British East India Company (EIC). She wrecked in 1801 during the British military expedition to the Red Sea.

== Career ==
Gabriel was built to carry cotton. She had a forecastle and poop, with beams and waterways laid for the orlop deck. However, these were not planked as storage of cotton was easier if the lowest deck had not been laid. (Note: Phipps has a detailed breakdown of the cost of construction for Gabriel. Materials (including lumber), accounted for 77.4% of the total cost of 115,538 sicca rupees, and labor accounted for 22.6%. Fully fitted out for sea her cost was 125,000 sicca ruppes. At approximately 10 sicca rupees per pound sterling, the construction cost would have been £12,500.)

Between 1794 and 1795 Gabriel was engaged in local trade.

Captain John Caise sailed from Diamond Harbour on 16 January 1796, bound for England under charter to the EIC. Gabriel was at Saugor on 13 February, and reached St Helena on 27 June. By 26 November she was at Crookhaven, and she arrived at The Downs on 11 December. On 25 February 1797 she was admitted to the Registry of Great Britain. Gabriel enters Lloyd's Register in 1897 with Carrs, master, and Hamilton, owner.

On 11 September 1797 Gabriel was on her way to India when she was caught up in a gale. She put into Torbay, having lost her anchor and having had her galleries stove in.

Between 29 July and 1798, Gabriel, under the command of Captain William Turnbull, made a voyage to Bengal.

On 9 February 1799 Captain Turnbull sailed from Bengal for England. Gabriel reached St Helena on 10 May, and by 17 July was "toward England".

In 1800 she was again in local trade in India.

== Fate ==
The British government used Gabriel as a transport to support General Sir David Baird's expedition to the Red Sea, which in turn had the objective of supporting General Sir Ralph Abercrombie at the battle of Alexandria.

Lloyd's List reported on 25 May 1802 that Gabriel had been lost in the Red Sea. She had been wrecked on 8 September 1801 in the Strait of Jubal at the entrance to the Gulf of Suez. Captain Turnbull and the crew of 100 men, and 42 women and 46 children, dependents of the 61st Regiment of Foot, were all saved.

The crew and passengers sailed in the ship's boats to Cosseir. There Turnbull arranged for an Arab dhow to take the women and children to Jeddah.
