= Ruby (1800 ship) =

History

Great Britain
- Name: Ruby
- Owner: 1801:George Jackson; 1804:Blake & Co.
- Port of registry: 1800:Calcutta; 1804:London
- Launched: 1800, or 1797, at Calcutta (Note: Phipps and the India Office records at the British library give a launch year of 1800. Both Lloyd's Register, and the Register of Shipping give a launch year of 1797, a year that Hackman repeats.)
- Fate: Lost 1814, or possibly later
- Notes: Teak-built

General characteristics
- Tons burthen: 248, or 249, or 250, or 271, or 27144/94 or 280, or 300 (bm)
- Propulsion: Sail
- Armament: 12 × 6-pounder guns

Ruby was launched at Calcutta, probably in 1800 but possibly in 1797. She participated in the expedition to the Red Sea and made one voyage for the British East India Company. Although she took on British Registry, she probably sailed only in Indian waters and to Australia. She made one voyage in 1811 transporting three convicts to Port Jackson, and then transferring 80 convicts from there to Van Diemen's Land. She was probably lost in 1813, but possibly in 1818 or 1820.

== Career ==
Ruby sailed from Ambonya on 23 February 1800 and anchored at Sulu on 15 March. The next morning Captain Pavin of Ruby went ashore in the jolly boat with seven crew members. About an hour later five proas, armed with 9-pounder brass guns in their bows took up positions three on one side of Ruby and two on the other. The proas held off until 5 PM when three shore batteries started firing on Ruby. The mate was able to cut her cables and get her underway. She held her fire but eventually had to engage the batteries and the proas which were making to board. Ruby was able to silence her attackers. She had one man wounded and some damage from the enemy's fire. The mate sailed to Manada, where he reported to the British resident. Ruby then sailed to Amourang (Amurang) Bay (about 30 miles southwest of Manada; 1°13′N 124°34′E). There she gathered a cargo of rice that she delivered to Ambonya. Later, when Apollo visited Sulu, Captain Porter received Pavin's hat and the jolly boat, and the information that Pavin and his men had been hacked to death.

Ruby appears among the "country ships" that served as transports or troop ships to support Major-General Sir David Baird's expedition in 1800 to the Red Sea. Baird was in command of the Indian army that was going to Egypt to help General Ralph Abercromby expel the French from there. Baird landed at Kosseir, on the Egyptian side of the Red Sea. He then led his troops across the desert to Kena on the Nile, and then to Cairo. He arrived before Alexandria in time for the final operations. Ruby received her provisions and sailed on 31 March 1801 for the Red Sea. She also called in at Al-Qusayr in August. Ruby was under the command of Fraser Sinclair, but he left her after her return from the Red Sea.

Captain John Hitchings sailed Ruby from Calcutta on 26 January 1803, bound for England. She was at Saugor on 8 February, reached Saint Helena on 12 May, and arrived at Portsmouth on 24 July. While she was in English waters a press gang from a British Royal Navy ship came up and removed some of her crew, further burdening a crew that was already spending much of their time on the pumps dealing with leaks.

Ruby was admitted to the Registry of Great Britain on 26 January 1804. On 26 March Ruby Captain Blake, sailed down the River Thames, bound for India.

Ruby first appeared in Lloyd's Register for 1806 with Blake, maser, Capt. & Co., owners, and trade London—India.

This entry, uninformative as it is concerning Ruby's actual voyages, continues unchanged through 1813, which is the last year in which she was listed in either Lloyd's Register or the Register of Shipping. There is no record of Ruby having made any more voyages for the EIC, and the EIC still had a monopoly on trade between England and India and China. It is, therefore, most probable that Ruby sailed as a London-registered "country ship", i.e., only within the Far East.

Ruby, Cripps, master, made one voyage from Calcutta to Port Jackson in 1811. She was carrying merchandise and three convicts, sentenced to transportation in Bengal. She left her pilot on 28 June and reached Bencoolen on 4 August. She took on water there and sailed again four days later. She arrived at Port Jackson on 28 September.

The government then chartered Ruby to carry a detachment of the 73rd Regiment of Foot under the command of Major Andrew Geils, who had been appointed Commandant at Hobart. She also transported 80 convicts from Port Jackson to Van Diemen's Land. Troops and convicts embarked on Ruby on 10 February 1812.

Captain Thomas Cripps apparently lost command of Ruby while at Port Jackson due to embezzlement of funds. He escaped on 10 February aboard Cyclops, which was sailing to Bengal. His replacement was Captain Ambrose, and it was he that sailed to Hobart. Ruby left Van Diemen's Land on 26 March 1812, and returned to Bengal.

== Fate ==
Ruby is on an 1814 list as one of several vessels built in India but later under British Registry and known to be "Lost, burnt, or taken". However, another source has her lost on the Sandheads in July 1818, or 1820.
