= HMS Alert (1779) =

History

Great Britain
- Name: HMS Alert
- Builder: Dover
- Laid down: October 1778
- Launched: 1 October 1779
- Fate: Captured by France, 25 September 1780

France
- Name: Alerte
- Acquired: by capture, 25 September 1780
- In service: September 1780
- Fate: Recaptured by Great Britain, 28 November 1781

Great Britain
- Name: HMS Alert
- Fate: Sold to break up at Deptford, October 1792

General characteristics
- Tons burthen: 110 (bm)
- Length: 24.0 metres
- Beam: 7.6 metres
- Depth of hold: 3.4 metres
- Sail plan: Full-rigged ship
- Armament: 18 guns

HMS Alert was an 18-gun cutter of the Royal Navy. She took part in the War of American Independence, where she was captured by the French Navy and brought into their service. She was part on the squadron under Grasse until a British frigate recaptured her.

== Service history ==
=== British career ===
Alert was built at Dover in 1779. She patrolled in the Gulf of Biscay until Diligente captured her on 25 September 1780 off the Gironde. The French brought her into service as Alerte.

=== French career ===
Alerte was attached to the squadron of Grasse, under Ensign Gallien de Chabons. She took part in the Battle of Fort Royal on 29 April and 30 April 1781.

On 28 November 1781, the 36-gun frigate HMS Perseverance recaptured her after a long battle. Auxiliary officer Galocheau was wounded and lost an eye.

== Fate ==
Alert was sold to break up at Deptford in October 1792.
