= Robert Seppings =

English naval architect (1767–1840)

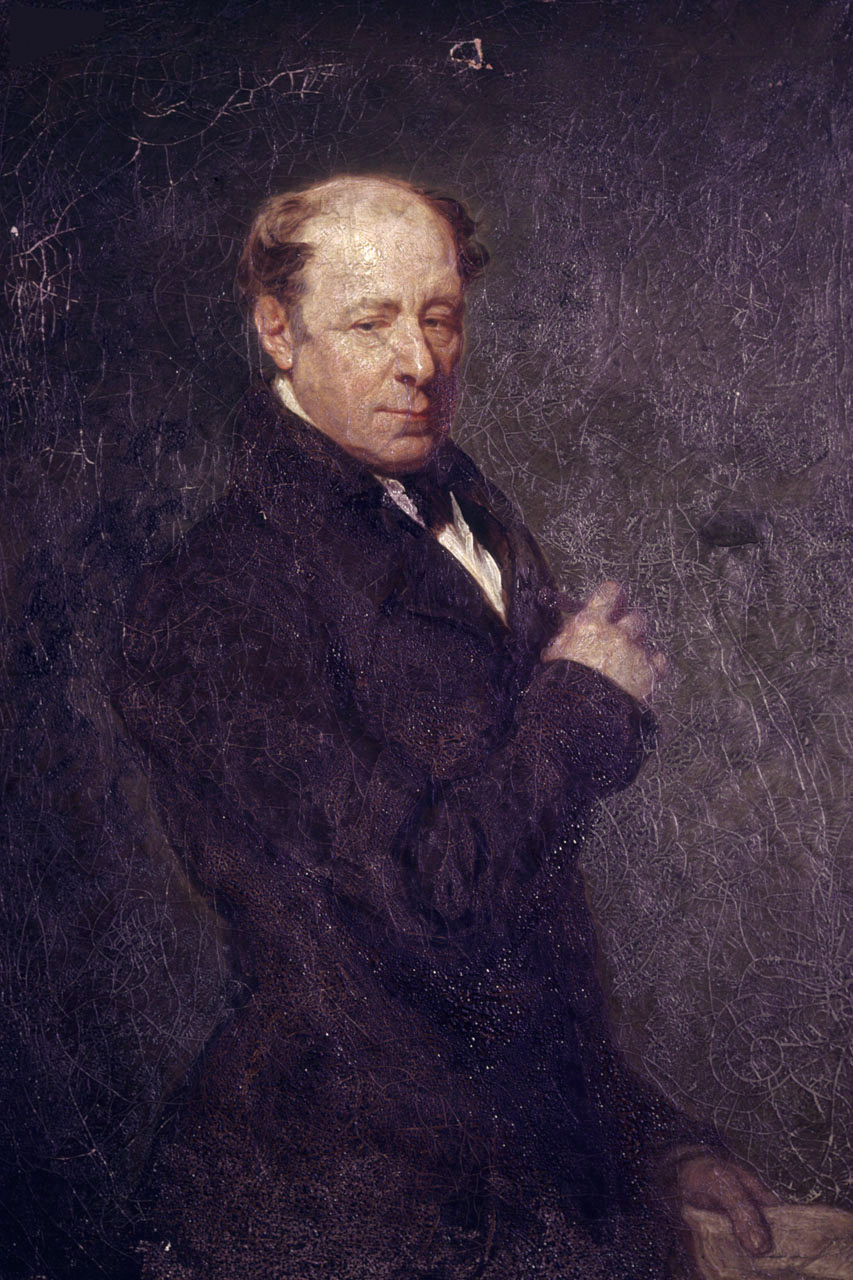
Robert Seppings (1767–1840) (William Bradley)

Sir Robert Seppings, FRS (11 December 1767 – 25 April 1840) was an English naval architect. His experiments with diagonal trusses in the construction of ships led to his appointment as Surveyor of the Navy in 1813, a position he held until 1835.

== Biography ==
Seppings was born to Robert Seppings (1734–1781) and his wife Lydia Milligen (1740–1821), at Fakenham, Norfolk, on 11 December 1767 and was baptised three days later. In 1782 he was apprenticed in Plymouth Dock. In 1800, when he had risen to be master shipwright assistant in the yard, he invented a device which greatly reduced the time required to repair the lower portions of ships in dry dock when compared with the laborious process of lifting then in vogue. His plan was to make the keel of the ship rest upon a series of supports placed on the floor of the dock and each consisting of three parts - two being wedges arranged one on each side of the keel at right angles to it, with their thin ends together, while the third was a vertical wedge fitting in and supported by the lower pair. The result was that it became possible in a comparatively short time to remove these supporting structures by knocking out the side wedges, when the workmen gained free access to the whole of the keel, the vessel remaining suspended by the shores. Soon, his creation became commonly known as "Seppings Blocks." For this invention Seppings received £1000 from the Admiralty, and in 1804 was promoted to be a master shipwright at Chatham.

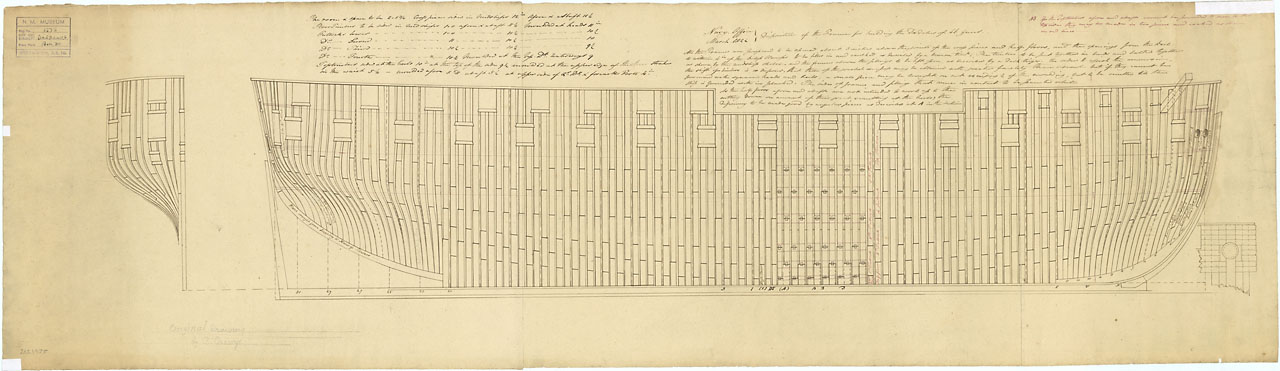
Plan of a ship (HMS Daedalus of 1826) incorporating the Seppings designed 'round stern', this strengthened the structure of the stern, made it more resistant to enemy fire and allowed more guns to fire directly aft and to the stern quarters. It was, however, unpopular on aesthetic grounds, being soon replaced by the 'elliptical stern', which was more conservative in appearance.

At Chatham, in spite of the repugnance to innovation displayed by the naval authorities of that period, he was able to introduce important innovations in the methods of ship-construction. Seppings innovations were probably influenced by the work of William May, shipbuilder for the Dutch Navy in Amsterdam and son of John May. Quoted as saying "partial strength produces general weakness", Seppings significantly improved the strength and seaworthiness of the Navy's fleet. He improved the design of the bow and the stern, but his greatest influence on ship design was in the introduction of 'diagonal bracing' into the construction of the hull. He first experimented with the idea in 1800 when he retrofitted the frigate HMS Glenmore with the trusses. The method was first introduced to a ship of the line in 1805 with the refitting of the 74-gun HMS Kent.

The use of the diagonal trusses greatly increased the stiffness of the hull, improving a ship's sea worthiness and, more importantly, allowing longer hulls to be built without the drawback of excessive hogging (drooping of the hull at the bow and stern, where buoyancy is at its lowest). This meant that the rigging had better anchor points to take the force of high cross-winds, while 'working' of the hull was lessened. Working was the term used for the result of shear forces along the hull in rough seas opening and closing the joints between hull planking. This caused the oakum caulking between the planks to become ineffective, thus leading to problematic leaking.

Seppings was also instrumental, along with other innovators, in the introduction of iron elements into ship construction, reducing the need for 'grown timbers', which were in increasingly short supply (grown timbers were structural elements, such as 'knees', that needed timber grown to shape in the living tree, in order to give the required strength).

These stronger designs offered better protection to the crews against the enemy's fire than had the old forms, permitted a powerful armament to be fitted, and better allowed the ships to be kept on-station during bad weather, since the vessel would be more able to resist the stresses, consequently reducing wear on the hull and subsequent leaks and salt water damage (especially insidious and dangerous to a ship where wood and iron were in contact).

Seppings was appointed joint Surveyor of the Navy alongside Joseph Tucker in 1813, and held that office till his retirement in 1832.

Seppings received a knighthood in 1819. He died at Taunton on 25 April 1840.

== Family ==
In June 1795 he married Charlotte Milligen (1770–1834). They had six daughters and four sons.
