= Admiral Reynolds =

Admiral Reynolds may refer to:

- Barrington Reynolds (1786–1861), British Royal Navy admiral
- John Reynolds (Royal Navy officer) (c. 1713–1788), British Royal Navy admiral
- Robert Carthew Reynolds (1745–1811), British Royal Navy rear admiral
- William Reynolds (naval officer) (1815–1879), U.S. Navy rear admiral
- William E. Reynolds (1860–1944), U.S. Coast Guard rear admiral
