= St Clement, Cornwall =

Village in Cornwall, England

Coordinates: 50.255°N 5.018°W

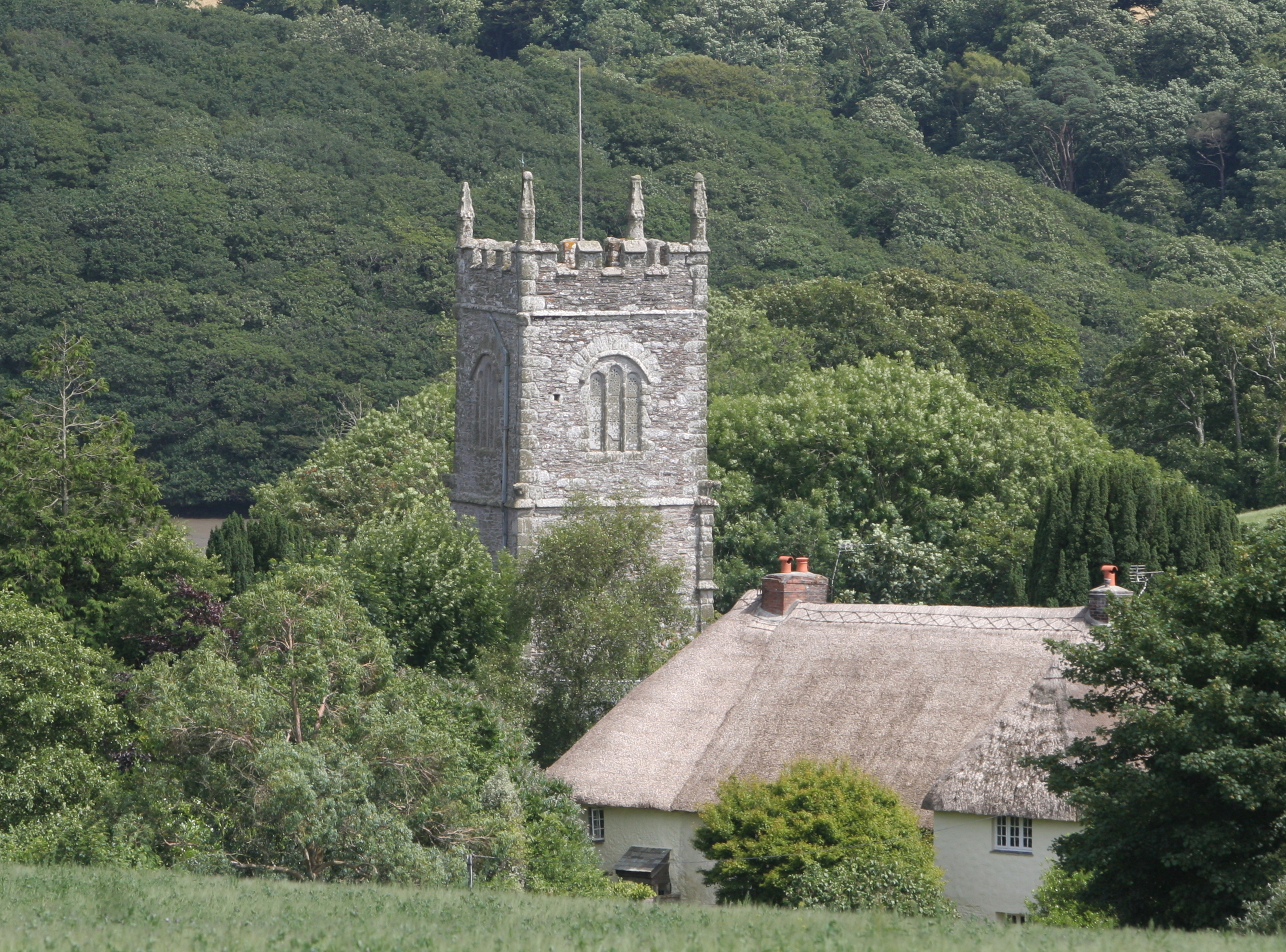
View of St Clement from the Truro road

St Clement (Cornish: Klemens) is a civil parish and village in Cornwall, England, United Kingdom. It is situated southeast of Truro in the valley of the Tresillian River. Other notable villages within the parish are the much larger Tresillian 1.4 miles (2.3 km) to the north east of St Clement village itself and another village at Malpas to the south of the parish. The urban part of the parish of St Clement was incorporated into Truro in 1895. The remainder of the parish had a population of 1,064 at the 2011 census.

From 2009 to 2021, St Clement was covered by the Ladock, St Clement and St Erme division. From the 2021 local elections, it will be within the Truro Tregolls division.

St Clement is attractive for tourists: aside from the natural beauty of the surrounding countryside they come to see the village church and its associated conservation projects that are maintained by members of the local community. Unlike some other villages in the district, the village of St Clement has changed very little in recent times.

The parish of St Clement lies within the Cornwall Area of Outstanding Natural Beauty (AONB). The Tresillian River includes many scenic paths leading to a walkway owned by the Duchy of Cornwall.

== History and antiquities ==
The old name of this place is Moresk ( Sea - water[s]) and there was a castle here in Norman times. The manor of Moresk was one of the seventeen Antiqua maneria of the Duchy of Cornwall. There was also an electoral ward of the former Carrick District called Moresk. Malpas is nearer the Truro River: a road journey there means going via Truro (3.3 miles).

=== Parish church ===
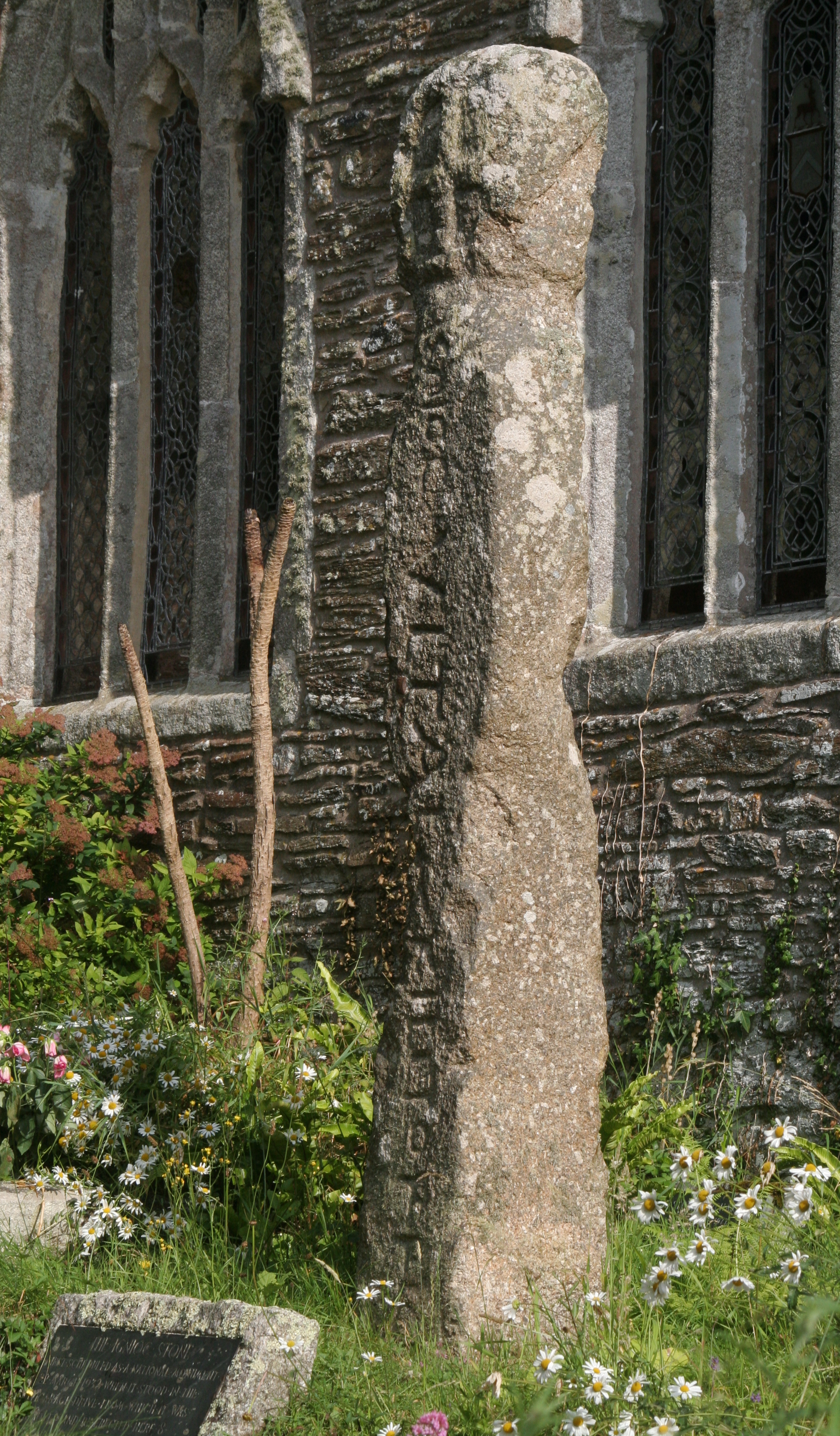
The inscribed cross (Ignioc stone)

The church is medieval but has lost much of its interest due to later restorations. John Betjeman is less critical than Charles Henderson of the restoration of 1865 and remarks on the graveyard inscriptions. The tower, in three stages, is built of slate and has a datestone for 1326 which corresponds to the style of building (however the third stage is of a later date). The rest of the church was decayed by the 1860s so most of the present fabric is from 1865 (however certain parts show genuine 13th-century work). The north transept has an arch matching the arcade of the south aisle (six bays in granite, nearly semi-circular arches and standard piers with elaborate capitals). The bells were recast by Messrs Warner and Sons of London in 1881.

There are two notable monuments: to Samuel Thomas (d. 1796), the work of John Bacon, 1799, has two allegorical figures; the other is to Rear-Admiral Robert Carthew Reynolds, from the studio of Micali, Livorno, and shows a young soldier and two women, the soldier points to a monument with a naval battle, above is the portrait medallion. The battle is probably the engagement with the Droits de l'Homme. Captain Reynolds commanded the frigate Amazon in the action of 13 January 1797 when, in company with HMS Indefatigable, the frigates engaged and drove ashore the much larger French ship of the line Droits de l'Homme. In the heavy storm in which the battle was fought, Amazon became unmanageable and was also wrecked, although the frigate was beached and all but six of her men survived, unlike her larger opponent which was run onto a sandbar and destroyed with hundreds of lives lost.

Cross in churchyard

The churchyard contains an inscribed stone cross: the first word of the inscription is perhaps isnioc (later opinion believes ignioc). The inscription is Ignioc Vitali fili Torrici (i.e. Ignioc son of Vitalus son of Torricus) and the dating is 5th to 7th century. Another inscription is in Ogham, perhaps partly in Irish. The inscriptions are both older than the carving of the upper part into a cross.

=== Penair House ===
The house was built by Rear-Admiral Robert Carthew Reynolds (d. 1811) and was the residence of his son Barrington Reynolds (1786–1861). This house replaced an older one at least going back as far as the 17th century.

=== Pencalenick House ===
Pencalenick House was a large country home on the banks of the Tresillian River. It was owned by a branch of the Vivian family from the 1700s. In 1797 John Vivian was the owner. By the 1870s, the house had passed to Captain J. C. Vivian the MP for Truro. In May 1879, a fire broke out in the vineyard and associated greenhouses.

The house, by then owned by Michael Henry Williams, was rebuilt by J. P. St Aubyn in 1881 and stands in historic parklands. In 1882, for local government payments, the house was rated at £300 per annum compared with the nearby Killiow mansion at £80 and the larger Tregothnan at £200. Williams died at Pencalenick aged 78 in 1902. In 1947, Cornwall County Council purchased Pencalenick House for £10,000 (equivalent to £259,408 in 2018), with the intention of using it as a school for "sub-normal children".

The land around and including Calenick Creek has been designated an Area of Outstanding Natural Beauty.

== Notable residents ==
- Condor of Cornwall (fl. 1066), Earl of Cornwall, according to William Hals may have been born or lived here
- Francis Jenkins (1756–1839), Vicar of St Clement for over fifty years
- Lilian Knowles (1870–1926), economic historian and scholar (LSE), was born in St Clement
- Jessica Mann (1937 – 2018), writer and novelist
- Sir Barrington Reynolds, Admiral in the Royal Navy
- Robert Carthew Reynolds, Rear-Admiral in the Royal Navy
- Charles Thomas, historian and archaeologist
- John Vivian MP, the grandfather of Herbert Vivian, writer, journalist and newspaper proprietor
- John Laskey Woolcock, Australian barrister and judge

== Literary associations ==
Malpas ferry is associated with the legend of Iseult and Tristan as a point on Iseult's journey. W. J. Burley's Wycliffe and the Last Rites is set in a Cornish village called Moresk.
