= Barrington Reynolds =

Royal Navy Admiral (1786–1861)

Admiral Sir Barrington Reynolds GCB
- Born: 1786; Penair, Cornwall
- Died: 3 August 1861 (aged 74–75); Penair, Cornwall
- Military career
- Allegiance: United Kingdom
- Branch: Royal Navy
- Service years: 1795 to 1861
- Rank: Admiral
- Commands: Cape of Good Hope Station; Plymouth Command
- Conflicts: French Revolutionary Wars; Destruction of the Droits de l'Homme; Napoleonic Wars; Bombardment of Acre, 1840; Operations against Brazilian slavers, 1849-1852
- Awards: Knight Grand Cross of the Order of the Bath

Admiral Sir Barrington Reynolds GCB (1786 – 3 August 1861) was a senior and long-serving officer of the British Royal Navy who went to sea with his father aged only nine during the French Revolutionary Wars and was captured by the French aged eleven. Returning to service on his release soon afterwards, Reynolds experienced the successive deaths of his elder brother and his father on active service during the Napoleonic Wars as well as severe bouts of ill-health himself. Leaving the service at the end of the war, Reynolds returned to the Navy in the 1840s after an absence of thirty years and played a major role in the final destruction of the illegal trade in African slaves to Brazil. Reynolds was honoured for this service and retired again to his family seat in Cornwall, where he died aged 75.

== Early career ==
Barrington Reynolds was the second son of Rear-Admiral Robert Carthew Reynolds, a successful and long-serving Royal Navy officer who had once served under Samuel Barrington who is probably the origin of Barrington's Christian name. Like his elder brother, Barrington Reynolds had been born at the family seat in Penair, near Truro, Cornwall, but aged only nine he was brought onto his father's ship the frigate HMS Amazon for service as a captain's servant. Britain was engaged at this time in the French Revolutionary Wars and Amazon was attached to the squadron under Sir Edward Pellew which harassed French shipping along the Biscay Coast. In February 1797, Amazon and Pellew's ship HMS Indefatigable engaged the much larger French ship of the line Droits de l'Homme in a storm off Brest. During the engagement, skilful manoeuvering by the British drove the French ship onto rocks with the loss of hundreds of lives. Amazon too was wrecked, but Captain Reynolds succeeded in beaching her rather than running her onto rocks and as result, all but six of her crew survived to become prisoners of war.

Barrington Reynolds was released with his father a year later and returned to service on HMS Pomone, before transferring to Indefatigable as a midshipman, his first commission away from his father. When Pellew moved to HMS Impetueux he took the young Reynolds with him and the midshipman gained combat experience in several raiding operations on the French coast under the command of Lieutenant John Pilfold. Late in 1800 Reynolds briefly rejoined his father in HMS Orion before being promoted lieutenant on HMS Courageux he soon moved to HMS Hussar and later transferred again, to the frigate HMS Niobe in which he remained for the next five years until 1808. In 1804 his elder brother, Lieutenant Robert Reynolds, was killed in action off Martinique.

=== Independent command ===
In 1808, Reynolds moved to HMS Russell but less than a year later was given his first command, the hulk HMS Arrogant. In February 1811 he became a commander and took over the sloop HMS Hesper in which he participated in the attack on Java and was promoted to post captain as a reward, taking over HMS Sir Francis Drake. The Admiralty confirmed his promotion in 1812, in recognition of the services of his father, who had died in the wreck of HMS St George on Christmas Eve 1811. He returned to Britain in August 1812 in command of HMS Bucephalus and remained in her for a year before entering semi-retirement due to ill-health. Following the end of the war in 1815, Reynolds was offered continued service as a frigate captain in the reduced Navy, but was forced to turn the post down due to a protracted bout of ill-health.

== Anti-slavery operations ==
Reynolds settled into an early retirement for his convalescence, marrying Eliza Anne Dick (died August 1832) and living either in London or at his family estate at Penair, Cornwall. In 1838, Reynolds health had sufficiently recovered that he could return to sea, taking command of the ship of the line HMS Ganges in the Mediterranean and being made a Companion of the Order of the Bath. In Ganges, Reynolds participated in the bombardment of Acre during operations against Egyptian forces. Reynolds was promoted to rear-admiral in 1848, and given command at the Cape of Good Hope Station, with instructions to clamp down on the illegal slave traders who operated from West Africa.

Reynolds was so successful off Africa, that at Admiralty dispatched him to cruise off the Brazilian coast on the same service. Over the next three years, Reynolds and his squadron captured dozens of slave ships, boarded and captured more at anchor on the Brazilian coast and, despite loud protests from the Brazilian government, raided Brazilian harbours along the coast, burning the empty slave ships which sheltered in them. In reply to the protests, Reynolds wrote to the Admiralty that "Nothing can be done with the Brazilian government on this matter except by compulsion". The actions of the forces under Reynolds' command have been credited with destroying the Brazilian slave trade completely by 1851.

Promoted to vice-admiral in 1855, he became Commander-in-Chief, Plymouth in 1857 and was promoted to full admiral on retirement in 1860. He was also advanced to Knight Grand Cross of the Order of the Bath. He died in 1861 at the family home and was buried in St Clement's Churchyard near Truro.

== See also ==
- O'Byrne, William Richard (1849). "Reynolds, Barrington" . A Naval Biographical Dictionary . John Murray – via Wikisource.
- Lee, Sidney, ed. (1896). "Reynolds, Barrington" . Dictionary of National Biography. Vol. 48. London: Smith, Elder & Co.

== Notes ==
Military offices
Preceded by Sir James Dacres	Commander-in-Chief, Cape of Good Hope Station; 1848–1852	Succeeded by Vacant
Preceded by Sir William Parker	Commander-in-Chief, Plymouth; 1857–1860	Succeeded by Sir Arthur Fanshawe
