= Action of 13 January 1797 =

1797 battle of the War of the First Coalition

- Part of the War of the First Coalition
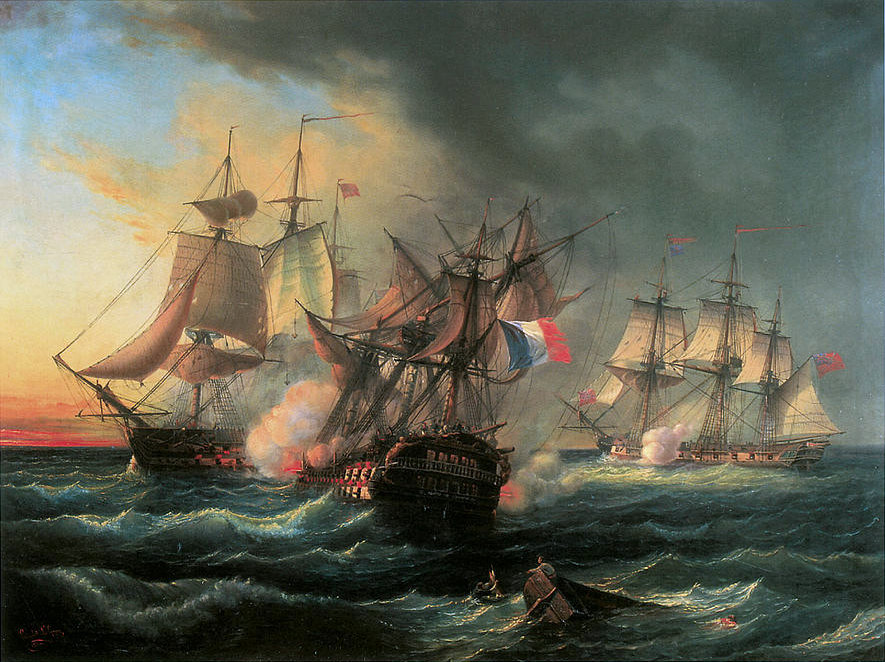
- 1853 painting of the battle
Date	13–14 January 1797
Location	Bay of Biscay, Atlantic Ocean 47°56′29″N 4°27′16″W
Result	British victory

Belligerents
Great Britain	France

Commanders and leaders
Edward Pellew; Robert Reynolds (POW)	Jean-Baptiste Raymond de Lacrosse

Strength
2 frigates	1 ship of the line

Casualties and losses
3 killed 34 wounded 6 drowned 250 captured 1 frigate wrecked	253 killed or wounded 400-900 drowned 1 ship of the line wrecked
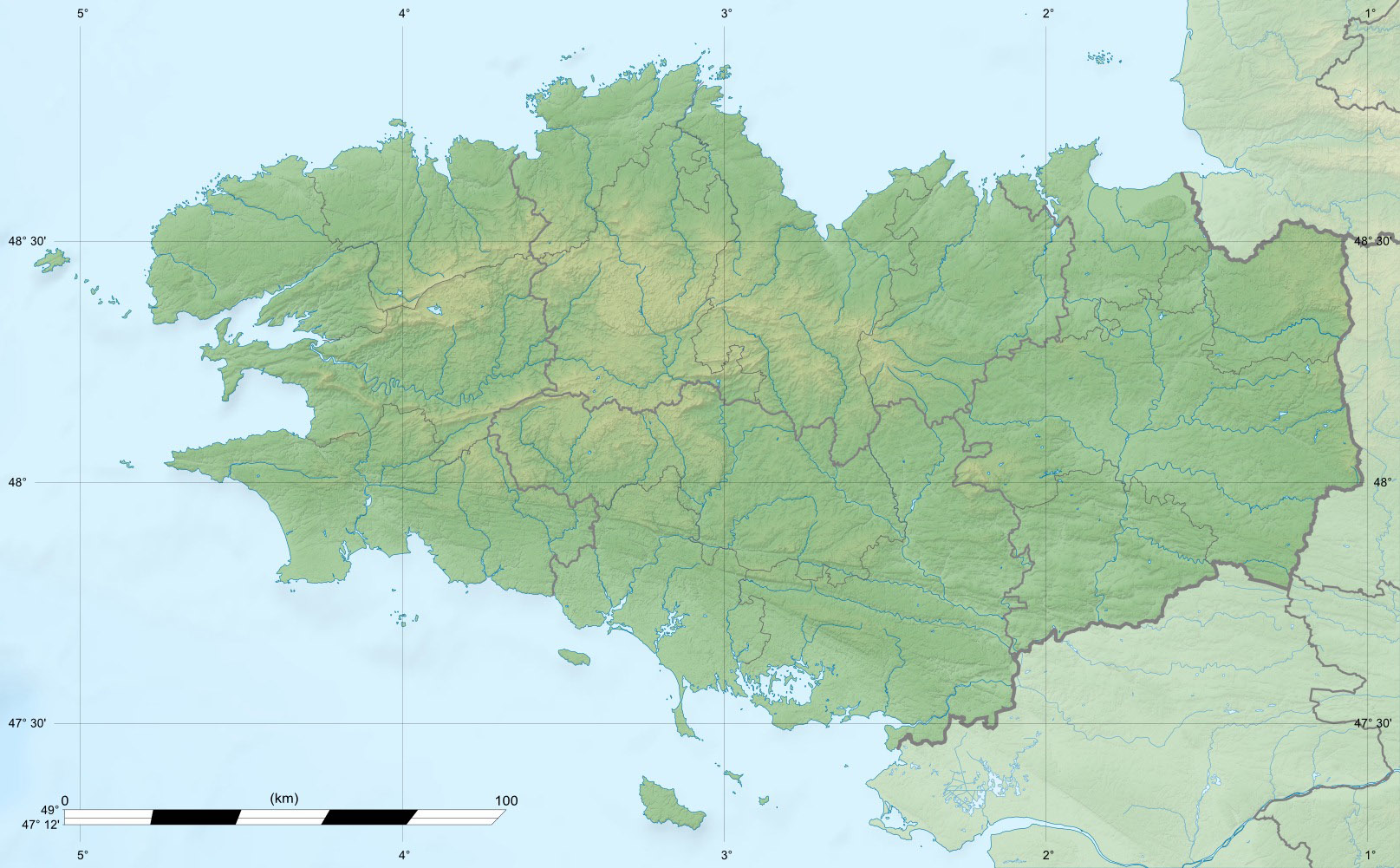
- Location of the battle, off the coast of Brittany

The action of 13 January 1797 (known by the French as the Naufrage du Droits de l'Homme; "shipwreck [or sinking] of the Droits de l'Homme") was fought between a French ship of the line and two British frigates off the coast of Brittany during the War of the First Coalition. During the action the frigates outmanoeuvred the much larger French vessel and drove it onto shore in heavy seas, resulting in the deaths of between 400 and 1,000 of the 1,300 persons aboard. One of the British frigates was also lost in the engagement with six sailors drowned after running onto a sandbank while failing to escape a lee shore.

The French 74-gun ship Droits de l'Homme had been part of the unsuccessful French expedition to Ireland. During the operation, the French fleet was beset by poor coordination and violent weather, eventually being compelled to return to France without landing a single soldier. Two British frigates, the 44-gun HMS Indefatigable and the 36-gun HMS Amazon, had been ordered to patrol the seas off Ushant in an attempt to intercept the returning French force and sighted the Droits de l'Homme on the afternoon of 13 January.

The engagement lasted for more than 15 hours, in an increasing gale and the constant presence of the rocky Breton coast. The seas were so rough that the French ship was unable to open the lower gun ports during the action and as a result could fire only the upper deck guns, significantly reducing the advantage that a ship of the line would normally have over the smaller frigates. The damage the more manoeuvrable British vessels inflicted on the French ship was so severe that as the winds increased, the French crew lost control and the Droits de l'Homme was swept onto a sandbar and destroyed.

== Background ==
In December 1796, during the War of the First Coalition, a French expeditionary force departed from Brest on an expedition to invade Ireland. This army of 18,000 French soldiers was intended to link up with the secret organisation of Irish Republicanism known as the United Irishmen and provoke a widespread uprising throughout the island. It was hoped that the resulting war would force Britain to make peace with the French Republic or risk losing control of Ireland altogether. Led by Vice-Admiral Morard de Galles, General Lazare Hoche and leader of the United Irishmen Wolfe Tone, the invasion fleet included 17 ships of the line, 27 smaller warships and transports, and carried extensive field artillery, cavalry and military stores to equip the Irish irregular forces they hoped to raise.

=== Departure from Brest ===
Morard de Galles planned to sail his fleet from the French naval fortress of Brest under cover of darkness on the night of 15–16 December. The British Channel Fleet normally maintained a squadron off Brest to blockade the port, but its commander, Rear-Admiral John Colpoys, had withdrawn his force from its usual station 20 nautical miles (37 km) offshore to 40 nautical miles (74 km) northwest of Brest because of severe Atlantic winter gales. The only British ships within sight of Brest were an inshore squadron of frigates under Sir Edward Pellew in HMS Indefatigable, accompanied by HMS Amazon, HMS Phoebe, HMS Révolutionnaire and the lugger HMS Duke of York. Pellew was already renowned, having been the first British officer of the war to capture a French frigate: the Cléopâtre at the action of 18 June 1793. He later captured the frigates Pomone and Virginie in 1794 and 1796, and saved 500 lives following the shipwreck of the East Indiaman Dutton in January 1796. For these actions he had first been knighted and then raised to a baronetcy. Indefatigable was a razee, one of the largest frigates in the Royal Navy, originally constructed as a 64-gun third rate and cut down to 44 guns in 1795 to make the ship fast and powerful enough to catch and fight the largest of French frigates. Armed with 24-pounder cannon on the main decks and 42-pounder carronades on the quarterdeck, she had a stronger armament than any equivalent French frigate.

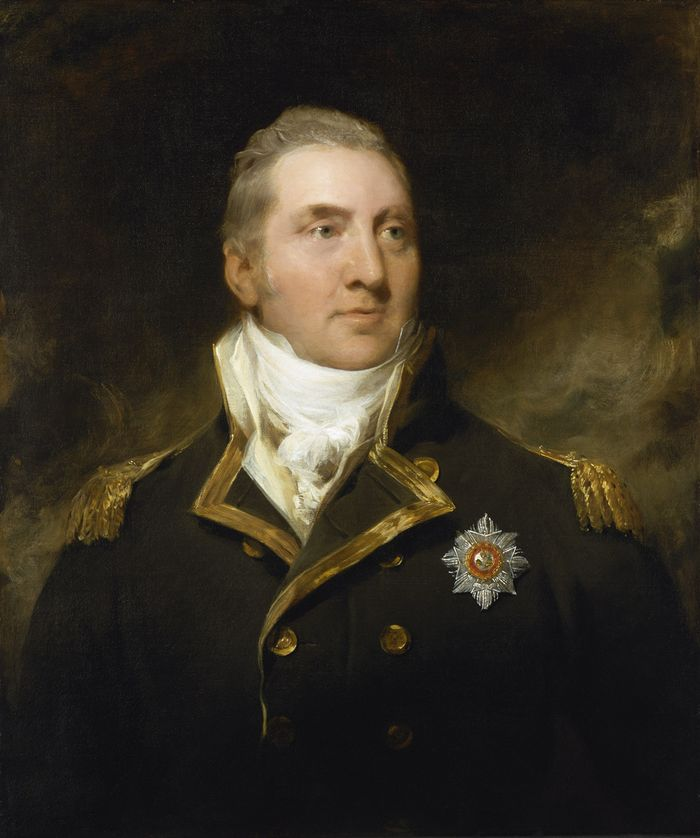
Portrait of Sir Edward Pellew by Thomas Lawrence, 1797

Observing the French fleet's departure from the harbour at dusk, Pellew immediately dispatched Phoebe to Colpoys and Amazon to the main fleet at Portsmouth with warnings, before approaching the entrance to Brest in Indefatigable with the intention of disrupting French movements. Believing that the frigates in the bay must be the forerunners of a larger British force, de Galles attempted to pass his fleet through the Raz de Sein. This channel was a narrow, rocky and dangerous passage, and de Galles used corvettes as temporary light ships that shone blue lights and fired fireworks to direct his main fleet through the passage. Pellew observed this, and sailed Indefatigable right through the French fleet, launching rockets and shining lights seemingly at random. This succeeded in confusing the French officers, causing the Séduisant to strike the Grand Stevenent rock and sink with the loss of over 680 men from a complement of 1,300. Séduisant's distress flares added to the confusion and delayed the fleet's passage until dawn. His task of observing the enemy completed, Pellew took his remaining squadron to Falmouth, sent a report to the Admiralty by semaphore telegraph, and refitted his ships.

=== Failure of the French expedition ===
Jean-Baptiste Raymond de Lacrosse, the captain of Droits de l'Homme

During December 1796 and early January 1797, the French army repeatedly attempted to land in Ireland. Early in the voyage, the frigate Fraternité carrying de Galles and Hoche, was separated from the fleet and missed the rendezvous at Mizen Head. Admiral Bouvet and General Grouchy decided to attempt the landing at Bantry Bay without their commanders, but severe weather made any landing impossible. For more than a week the fleet waited for a break in the storm, until Bouvet abandoned the invasion on 29 December and, after a brief and unsuccessful effort to land at the mouth of the River Shannon, ordered his scattered ships to return to Brest. During the operation and subsequent retreat a further 11 ships were wrecked or captured, with the loss of thousands of soldiers and sailors.

By 13 January most of the survivors of the fleet had limped back to France in a state of disrepair. One ship of the line that remained at sea, the 74-gun Droits de l'Homme, was commanded by Commodore Jean-Baptiste Raymond de Lacrosse and carried over 1,300 men, 700–800 of them soldiers, including General Jean Humbert. Detached from the main body of the fleet during the retreat from Bantry Bay, Lacrosse made his way to the mouth of the Shannon alone. Recognising that the weather was still too violent for a landing to be made, Lacrosse acknowledged the failure of the operation and ordered the ship to return to France, capturing the British privateer Cumberland en route.

== Chase ==
Pellew too was on his way back to Brest in Indefatigable, accompanied by Amazon under the command of Captain Robert Carthew Reynolds. While the rest of the Channel Fleet had been pursuing the French without success, Pellew had had his ships refitted and resupplied at Falmouth so that both frigates were at full complement, well armed and prepared for action. At 13:00 on 13 January, the British ships were approaching the island of Ushant in a heavy fog when they spied another ship through the gloom ahead. This ship, clearly much larger than either of the British vessels, was the Droits de l'Homme. At the same time, lookouts on the French ship spotted the British, and Lacrosse was faced with the dilemma of whether or not to engage the enemy. He knew that his ship was far larger than either of his opponents, but had earlier spotted sails to westwards he believed to be British and thus considered himself outnumbered and possibly surrounded. British records show that no other British vessels were in the vicinity at the time and it is likely that Lacrosse had seen the French ships Révolution and Fraternité returning to Brest from Bantry Bay. In addition, Lacrosse was concerned by the increasing gale and rocky lee shoreline, which posed a considerable threat to his over-laden vessel, which was already damaged from its winter voyage and carried a demi-brigade of the French Army and Humbert, neither of which could be placed at risk in an inconsequential naval action.

Determined to avoid battle, Lacrosse turned southeast, hoping to use his wider spread of sail to outrun his opponent in the strong winds. Pellew, however, manoeuvred to cut the Droits de l'Homme off from the French coast, at this stage still unsure of the nature of his opponent. As the chase developed, the weather, which had been violent for the entire preceding month, worsened. An Atlantic gale swept the Ushant headland, driving a blizzard eastwards and whipping the sea into a turbulent state, making steering and aiming more difficult. At 16:15, two of Droits de l'Homme's topmasts broke in the strong winds. This dramatically slowed the French ship, and allowed Pellew, who had recognised his opponent as a French ship of the line, to close with Droits de l'Homme.

== Battle ==
Pellew was aware that his frigate was heavily outclassed by his much larger opponent, and that Amazon, which was 8 nautical miles (15 km) distant, was not large enough to redress the balance when it did arrive. He correctly assumed, however, that the ocean was too rough to allow Lacrosse to open his lower gunports without the risk that heavy waves would enter them and cause Droits de l'Homme to founder. In fact, the French ship was totally unable to open her lower deck gunports during the action: an unusual design feature had the ports 14 inches (36 cm) lower than was normal and as a result the sea poured in at any attempt to open them, preventing any gunnery at all from the lower deck and halving the ship's firepower. Although this reduced the number of available guns on the French vessel, Lacrosse still held the advantage in terms of size, weight of shot and manpower. The French situation was worsened however by the loss of the topmasts: this caused their ship to roll so severely in the high seas that it was far more difficult both to steer the ship and to aim the guns than on the British vessels.

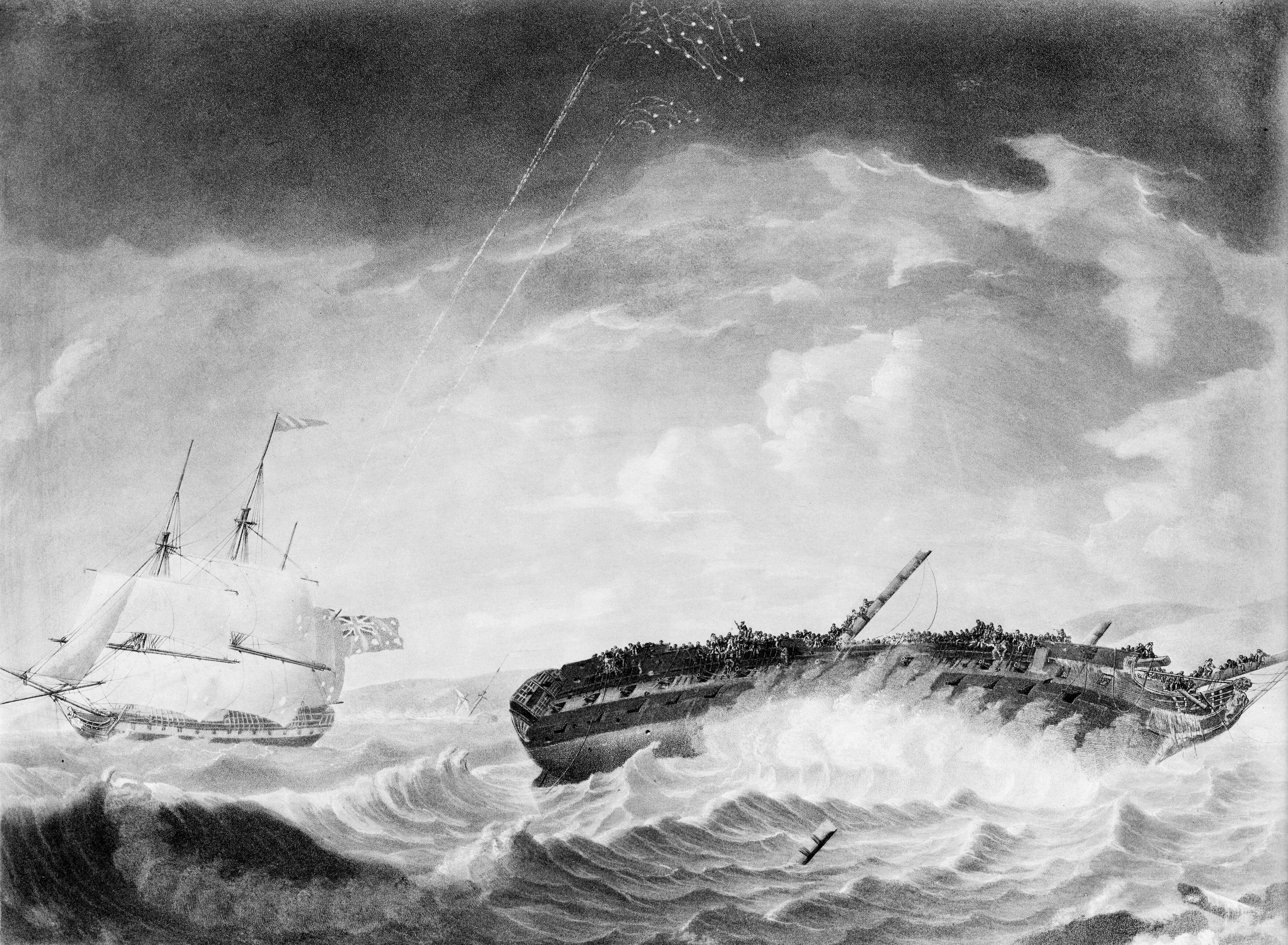
Engraving of Indefatigable (left) sailing past a wrecked Droits de l'Homme

To the surprise of Lacrosse and his officers, Indefatigable did not retreat from the ship of the line, nor did she pass the ship of the line at long-range to leeward as expected. Instead, at 17:30, Pellew closed with the stern of Droits de l'Homme and opened a raking fire. Lacrosse turned to meet the threat and opened fire with the guns on the upper deck accompanied by a heavy volley of musket fire from the soldiers on board. Pellew then attempted to pull ahead of Droits de l'Homme and rake her bow, to which Lacrosse responded by attempting to ram Indefatigable. Neither manoeuvre was successful, as Droits de l'Homme raked the British ship but caused little damage as most of her shot scattered into the ocean.

Indefatigable and Droits de l'Homme manoeuvred around one another, exchanging fire when possible until 18:45, when Amazon arrived. During this exchange, one of Droits de l'Homme's cannon burst, causing heavy casualties on her packed deck. Approaching the larger French ship with all sail spread, Reynolds closed to within pistol shot before raking Droits de l'Homme. Lacrosse responded to this new threat by manoeuvring to bring both British ships to face the westward side of his ship, avoiding becoming trapped in a crossfire. The battle continued until 19:30, when both Amazon and Indefatigable pulled away from their opponent to make hasty repairs. By 20:30, the frigates had returned to the much slower French ship and began weaving in front of Droits de l'Homme's bow, repeatedly raking her. Lacrosse's increasingly desperate attempts to ram the British ships were all unsuccessful and what little cannon fire he did manage to deploy was ineffectual, as the rolling of the ship of the line prevented reliable aiming.

By 22:30, Droits de l'Homme was in severe difficulties, with heavy casualties among her crew and passengers and the loss of her mizzenmast to British fire. Observing the battered state of their opponent, Pellew and Reynolds closed on the stern quarters of the French ship, maintaining a high rate of fire that was sporadically returned by Droits de l'Homme. Having exhausted the 4,000 cannonballs available, Lacrosse was forced to use the shells he was carrying, which had been intended for use by the army in Ireland. In the high winds, these proved even less effective than solid shot, but did drive the frigates to longer range. With their opponent almost immobilised, the British frigates were able to remain outside her arc of fire, effect repairs when necessary and secure guns that had broken loose in the heavy seas. For the rest of the night the three battered ships remained locked in a close range duel, until suddenly, at 04:20 while it was still dark, land was spotted just 2 nautical miles (3.7 km) to leeward by Lieutenant George Bell of the Indefatigable.

== Shipwrecks ==
Pellew immediately turned seawards in an effort to escape the shore and signalled Reynolds to follow suit. Although both ships had suffered severe damage from the battle and weather, they were able to make the turn away from land, Amazon to the north and Indefatigable, at the insistence of its Breton pilot, to the south. Initially it was believed that the land spotted was the island of Ushant, which would have given the ships plenty of sea-room in which to manoeuvre. However at 06:30, with the sky lightening, it became apparent on the Indefatigable that there were breakers to the south and east, indicating that the three ships had drifted during the night into Audierne Bay. On discovering his situation, Pellew was determined to bring his ship westwards, attempting to work his ship out of danger by beating against the wind. Hasty repairs had to be made to the damaged rigging before it was safe to alter their course. Due to her northwards turn, Amazon had even less room to manoeuvre than Indefatigable and by 05:00 she had struck a sandbank. Although the frigate remained upright, attempts over several hours to bring her off failed; at 08:00 Reynolds ordered his men to prepare to abandon ship.

Droits de l'Homme had been more seriously damaged than the British frigates, and was closer to shore at the time land was spotted. As Lacrosse's crew made desperate efforts to turn southwards, the ship's foremast and bowsprit collapsed under the pressure of the wind. With the ship virtually unmanageable, Lacrosse ordered the anchors lowered in an attempt to hold the ship in position until repairs could be made. This effort was futile, as all but two anchors had been lost during efforts to hold position in Bantry Bay, and British gunfire had damaged one of the anchor cables and rendered it useless. The final anchor was deployed, but it failed to restrain the ship and at 07:00 (according to the French account), the Droits de l'Homme struck a sandbank close to the town of Plozévet. This broke off the remaining mast and caused the ship to heel over onto her side.

=== Amazon ===
As daylight broke over Audierne Bay, crowds of locals gathered on the beach. The Droits de l'Homme lay on her side directly opposite the town of Plozévet, with large waves breaking over her hull; 2 nautical miles (3.7 km) to the north, Amazon stood upright on a sandbar, her crew launching boats in an effort to reach the shore, while Indefatigable was the only ship still afloat, rounding the Penmarck rocks at the southern edge of the bay at 11:00. On board the Amazon, Reynolds maintained discipline and gave orders to launch the ship's boats in an orderly fashion and to build rafts in which to bring the entire crew safely to shore. Six men disobeyed his command, stole a launch, and attempted to reach the shore alone, but were swept away by the current. Their boat was capsized by the waves, and all six drowned. The remaining crew, including those wounded in the previous night's action, were safely brought ashore by 09:00, where they were made prisoners of war by the French authorities.

=== Droits de l'Homme ===
Droits de l'Homme was irreparably damaged, and many of the men on board were soldiers with no training for what to do in the event of a shipwreck. Each successive wave swept more men into the water and desperate attempts to launch boats failed when the small craft were swept away by the waves and broken in the surf. Rafts were constructed, but several were swamped in attempts to carry a rope to the shore. The men on the one raft that remained upright were forced to cut the rope to prevent them from foundering in the heavy seas. Some of the men on this raft reached the beach, the first survivors of the wreck. Subsequent attempts were made by individuals to swim to shore with ropes, but they were either drowned or driven back to the ship by the force of the sea. With no aid possible from the shore, night fell on 14 January with most of the crew and passengers still aboard. During the night, the waves stove in the stern of the ship, flooding much of the interior. On the morning of 15 January, a small boat carrying nine British prisoners (part of the crew of the Cumberland, captured by Droits de l'Homme earlier in the campaign) managed to reach shore. The sight of the British-manned boat reaching shore prompted a mass launching of small rafts from the wreck in hopes of gaining the beach. However the waves increased once more, and not one of these small craft survived the passage.

By the morning of 16 January, the seas were still rough, whilst hunger and panic had taken over on the wreck. When a large raft carrying the wounded, two women and six children was launched during a lull in the weather, over 120 unwounded men scrambled to board it. This severely overloaded the craft and within minutes a large wave struck the heavy raft and capsized it, drowning all aboard. By the evening, the remaining survivors, without food or fresh water, began to succumb to exposure, and at least one officer drowned in a desperate attempt to swim to shore. Throughout the night, the survivors gathered on the less exposed parts of the hull, and, in the hope of staving off death by dehydration, drank sea water, urine, or vinegar from a small barrel that had floated up from the hold. The morning of 17 January finally saw a reduction in the storm and the arrival of a small French naval brig, the Arrogante. This ship could not come close without the risk of grounding but sent her boats to the wreck in the hope of rescuing survivors. The brig was joined later in the day by the cutter Aiguille.

On the Droits de l'Homme, many survivors were too weak to reach the boats, and a number of men fell from the hull and drowned in the attempt. Many more could not find room in the small boats, and only 150 men were rescued on 17 January. The following morning, when the boats returned, they found only 140 survivors left, at least as many again having died during the night. The last two people to leave the ship were the commanders General Humbert and Commodore Lacrosse. Taken to Brest, the survivors were fed and clothed and given medical treatment. All the surviving prisoners from the Cumberland were released and returned to Britain, in recognition of their efforts to save lives from the shipwreck.

== Aftermath ==
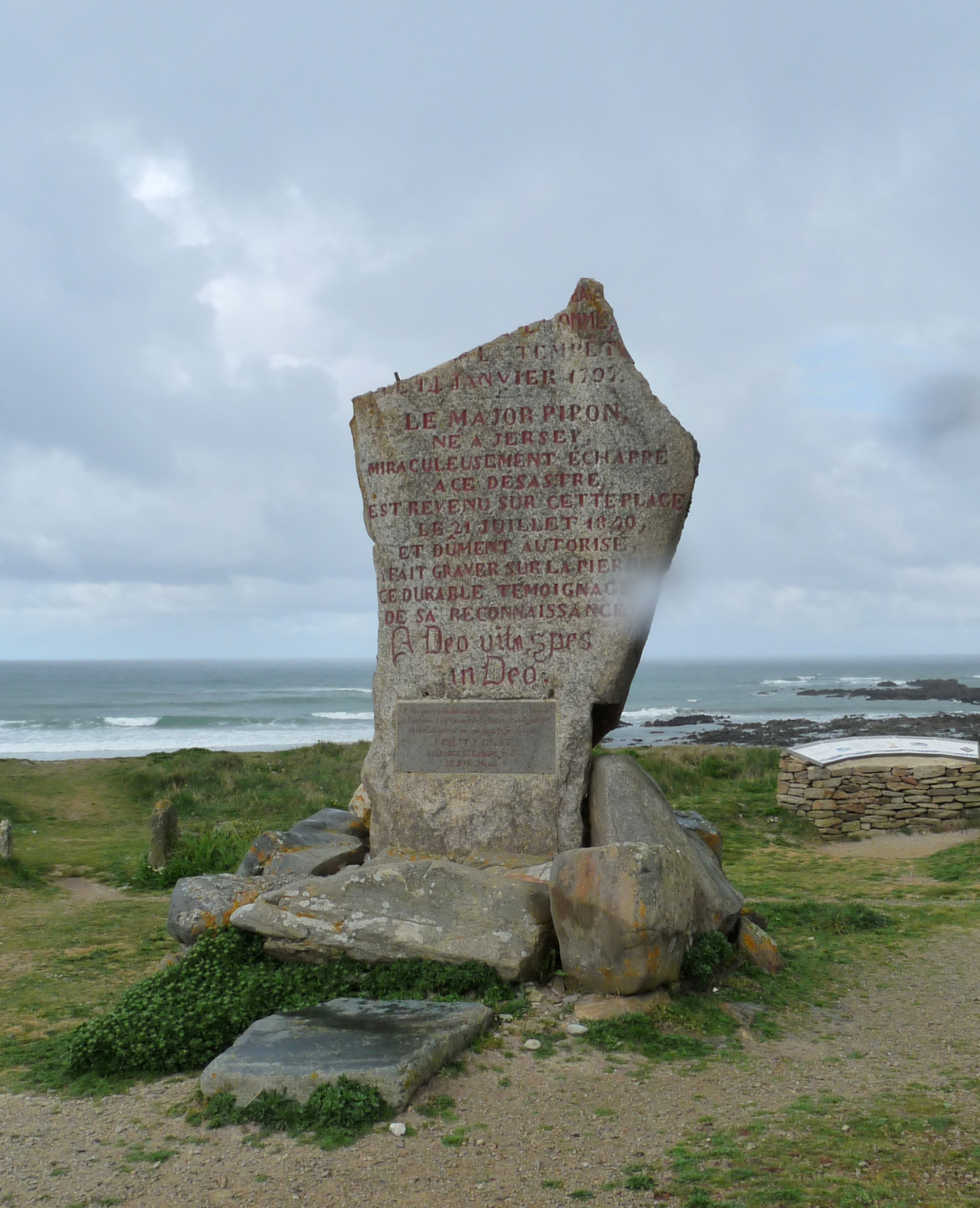
Damaged menhir commemorating the wreck of Droits de l'Homme

Exact French casualties are difficult to calculate, but of the 1,300 aboard Droits de l'Homme, 103 are known to have died in the battle and just over 300 were saved from the wreck, indicating the deaths of approximately 900 men on the French ship between the morning of 14 January and the morning of 18 January. Alternatively, a French source suggests that up to another 500 of the crew were rescued from the wreck by the corvette Arrogante and the cutter Aiguille on 17 and 18 January. This would give a toll of only about 400. A menhir at Plozévet, with an inscription carved in 1840 gives a death toll of six hundred.

Amazon lost three in the battle and six in her wreck, with 15 wounded, while Indefatigable did not lose a single man killed, suffering only 18 wounded. The discrepancy in losses during the action is likely due to the extreme difficulty the French crew had in aiming their guns given their ship's instability in heavy seas.

Reynolds and his officers were exchanged for French prisoners some weeks later, and in the routine court-martial investigating the loss of their ship were honourably acquitted "with every sentiment of the court's highest approbation." Reynolds was subsequently appointed to the large frigate HMS Pomone. The senior lieutenants of each frigate were promoted to commander and head money (prize money based on the number of the enemy's crew and awarded when the defeated ship was destroyed) was distributed among the crews. Pellew remained in command of Indefatigable off Brest for another year and seized a number of French merchant ships. He was later promoted several times, and by the end of the Napoleonic Wars in 1815 had become Lord Exmouth, Commander in Chief of the Mediterranean Fleet. Reynolds did not survive the war, dying in the wreck of HMS St George in 1811. Lacrosse and Humbert were not censured for the loss of their ship: the commodore was promoted to admiral and later became ambassador to Spain, while Humbert led the next and equally unsuccessful attempt to invade Ireland, surrendering at the Battle of Ballinamuck in 1798.

In Britain, the action was lauded at the time and since: First Lord of the Admiralty Lord Spencer described the operation as "an exploit which has not I believe ever before graced our naval annals". Historian James Henderson says of the action: "It was a feat of arms and seamanship such as had never been done before, and never was done again," and Richard Woodman calls it "a dazzling display of seamanship by all concerned in the alternating darkness and moonlight of a boisterous night". Five decades later the battle was among the actions recognised by the Naval General Service Medal, with clasps "Indefatigable 13 Jany. 1797" and "Amazon 13 Jany. 1797", awarded upon application to all British participants still living in 1847.

== Notes ==
Preceded by French expedition to Ireland (1796)	French Revolution: Revolutionary campaigns Action of 13 January 1797	Succeeded by Battle of Rivoli
