= Jean-Baptiste Raymond de Lacrosse =

French Navy officer, colonial administrator and diplomat (1760–1829)

- Portrait by Antoine Maurin, 1836

Governor of Saint Lucia
- In office 1792–1793
- Preceded by: Jean-Joseph Sourbader de Gimat
- Succeeded by: Nicolas Xavier de Ricard

Governor of Guadeloupe
- In office 5 January 1793 – 18 March 1793
- Preceded by: René Marie, vicomte d'Arrot
- Succeeded by: Georges Henri Victor Collot

Governor of Guadeloupe
- In office 30 May 1801 – 14 May 1802
- Preceded by: Maurice-Henri Bresseau
- Succeeded by: Antoine Richepanse

Governor of Guadeloupe
- In office 3 September 1802 – 8 May 1803
- Preceded by: Antoine Richepanse
- Succeeded by: Jean Augustin Ernouf

Personal details
- Born: 6 September 1760 Meilhan-sur-Garonne, France
- Died: 10 September 1829 (aged 69) Meilhan-sur-Garonne, France

Military service
- Allegiance: Kingdom of France; French First Republic; First French Empire
- Branch/service: French Navy; French Imperial Navy
- Years of service: 1779–1815
- Rank: Counter admiral
- Commands: Droits de l'Homme; Didon
- Battles/wars: American Revolutionary War; French Revolutionary Wars; French expedition to Ireland (1796); Action of 13 January 1797; Napoleonic Wars; Napoleon's planned invasion of the United Kingdom

Counter-Admiral Jean-Baptiste Raymond de Lacrosse (6 September 1760 – 10 September 1829) was a French Navy officer, colonial administrator and diplomat who served as the governor of Saint Lucia from 1792 to 1793. Seeing active service in the American Revolutionary War and French Revolutionary and Napoleonic Wars, he also served as the governor of Guadeloupe in 1793 and then again from 1801 to 1802 and again from 1802 to 1803.

== Early life ==
Jean-Baptiste Raymond de Lacrosse was born on 6 September 1760 in the town of Meilhan-sur-Garonne. During the American Revolutionary War he joined the French Navy in 1779 as a garde marine. Lacrosse was promoted to ship-of-the-line ensign in 1782, ship-of-the-line lieutenant in 1786 and ship-of-the-line captain in 1792, the year the War of the First Coalition of the French Revolutionary Wars broke out. He was also appointed as the governor of Saint Lucia in 1792, serving in the office until being replaced by Nicolas Xavier de Ricard in 1793.

== French Revolutionary Wars ==
Remaining loyal to the French First Republic which had replaced the Kingdom of France in September 1792, Lacrosse served as the provisional governor of Guadeloupe from 5 January to 18 March 1793. In 1795 he was sent to the French colonies of Martinique and Guadeloupe at the head of a naval force to suppress opposition to the Republic's rule in both possessions. When he returned to France Lacrosse was arrested but was eventually released.

Lacrosse subsequently participated in the unsuccessful French expedition to Ireland in December 1796, captaining Droits de l'Homme, a 74-gun ship of the line. The expedition failed to land in Ireland and on the return voyage to France Droits de l'Homme fought the action of 13 January 1797 against the British frigates HMS Indefatigable and HMS Amazon. Lacrosse was wounded and his ship ran aground and wrecked, though he avoided capture. Despite the loss of his ship Lacrosse was praised for his conduct and promoted to counter admiral.

== Diplomatic and colonial career ==
In 1799 Lacrosse was sent to Spain as a diplomatic envoy and negotiated the forcible return of French emigrants to France. Following his return he was offered the office of Minister of the Navy and the Colonies but declined. On 30 May 1801 First Consul Napoleon Bonaparte appointed Lacrosse as the governor of Guadeloupe and on 1 November he was detained by Afro-Guadeloupean troops under Magloire Pélage who were nominally loyal to France while leading a reconnaissance mission from Pointe-à-Pitre. Pélage expelled Lacrosse by forcing him to leave the colony onboard a Danish merchantmen, which deposited the governor at the British colony of Dominica.

In mid-1802 Lacrosse joined a French expeditionary force under Divisional-general Antoine Richepanse which had been sent by Bonaparte to restore France's authority in Guadeloupe. The expeditionary force landed on Guadeloupe in May and fighting soon broke out between the French and Afro-Guadeloupean troops. Though Richepanse had replaced Lacrosse as governor on 14 May, when the former died of yellow fever on 3 September the latter resumed serving as governor and assumed full command of the forces fighting against Afro-Guadeloupean insurgents resisting the reinstatement of French rule. During his tenure as governor Lacrosse gradually restricted the rights of free people of colour in Guadeloupe as part of the reinstatement of slavery by Napoleon.

== Napoleonic Wars and death ==
On 8 May 1803 Lacrosse was replaced as governor by Jean Augustin Ernouf and returned to France aboard the 40-gun frigate Didon as her captain. Unaware that Britain had declared war against France on 18 May due to being at sea, Lacrosse encountered a British fleet of 12 ships of the line blockading Brest. He evaded the fleet and captured the British privateer brig Laurel in the process. Reaching Spain Lacrosse left his prize in Santander and returned to France.

Following Lacrosse's return Bonaparte appointed him as a maritime prefect and one of the commanders of the Flottille de Boulogne, a flotilla at the Camp of Boulogne intended to convey French troops to Britain as part of Napoleon's planned invasion of the United Kingdom. On 14 July 1804 Lacrosse was among those made a Commander of the Legion of Honor by Bonaparte at a ceremony in Les Invalides, Paris. When Admiral Étienne Eustache Bruix died on 18 March 1805 Lacrosse succeeded him as commander-in-chief of the French Imperial Navy. Lacrosse retired in 1815, the final year of the Napoleonic Wars, and died in Meilhan-sur-Garonne on 10 September 1829.
