= Indian Chief (1796 ship) =

History

United States
- In service: 1796
- Fate: Burnt 18 January 1797

General characteristics
- Tons burthen: 280 (bm)

Indian Chief was an American vessel that appeared in Lloyd's Register (LR) in 1797 but was destroyed in a fire in that year.

Year	Master	Owner	Trade	Source
1797	J.Shaw	J.Shaw	London–Lisbon	LR

On 18 January 1797 Indian Chief, Shaw, master, was at Falmouth when she caught fire. She had a cargo of 1200 casks of pilchards that she was to take to the Straits of Gibraltar. She and her cargo were destroyed, but due to the assistance of the officers and men of HMS Indefatigable, all aboard were saved. Indian Chief had come from Cornwall.
