= Lilian Knowles =

British economic historian and academic

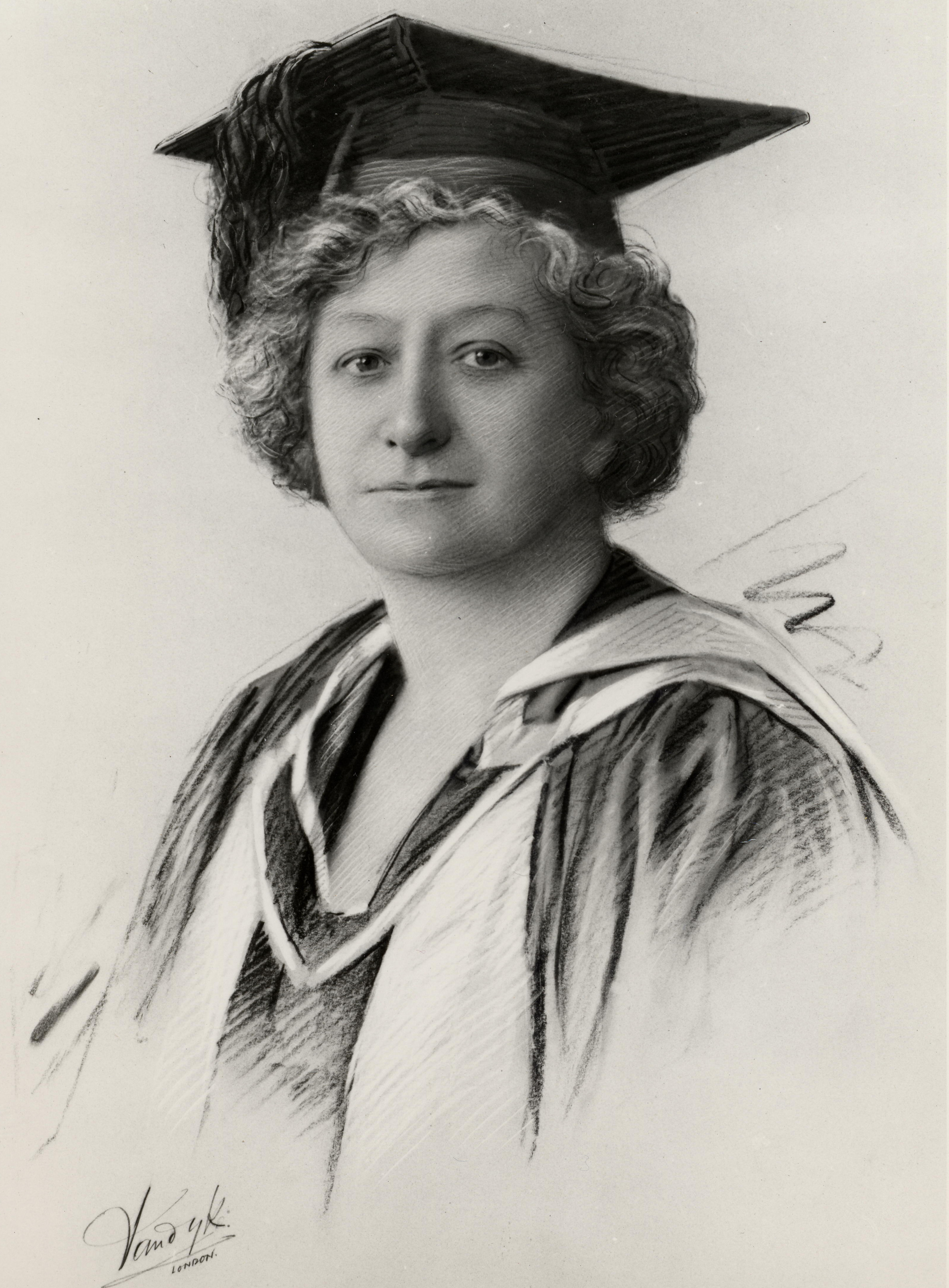
- Born: Lilian Charlotte Anne Tomn; 9 October 1870; St Clement, Cornwall, UK
- Died: 25 April 1926 (aged 55)
- Occupation: Professor of Economic History

Lilian Charlotte Anne Knowles (née Tomn; 9 October 1870 – 25 April 1926) was a British historian and Professor of Economic History at the London School of Economics (LSE). She was the first female Dean of the Economic History Faculty in the University of London.

== Early life and education ==
Born in St Clement, Cornwall, Knowles attended Truro High School. After a tour of the continent with her family she went to Girton College, Cambridge. At Girton she read history and law taking both a History Tripos and a Law Tripos (Part 1) in 1894. Both were judged to be "first class" and she was the first woman to obtain a first class in the law tripos. At the time she took her degree Cambridge did not allow women to receive their degrees. Knowles, as with many other such female students from both Cambridge and Oxford universities, was later, in 1907, to take the steamboat to Ireland to be conferred with an ad eundem University of Dublin degree at Trinity College, Dublin. Hers was a DLitt. Thus she became one of the steamboat ladies.

== Academic career ==
Between 1895 and 1899, Knowles was one of the London School of Economic's first research students and taught there as an occasional lecturer between 1897 and 1898. In 1904 she gained a teachership in modern economic history at LSE — thus, according to Berg, "becoming the first full-time teacher of the subject at any British university". In 1907 she was promoted to Reader in economic history.

Knowles campaigned vigorously on behalf of pacifist students and colleagues during World War I.

In 1921, Knowles was promoted to a professorship in Economic History becoming Britain's second professor in that subject (the first being George Unwin at the University of Manchester).

From 1920 to 1924, Knowles served as the University of London's Dean of the Faculty of Economics. This made her the first woman to become a Dean of the University of London. Notable students included Alice Clark, Ivy Pinchbeck, and Vera Anstey.

Outside academia, she was appointed by Bonar Law to a government inquiry into working class cost of living, and was the only female member of the Royal Commission on Income Tax, 1919–1920. She was especially concerned with the practice, extant at the time, of charging income tax on joint income of married couples. She was also a member of the Council of the Royal Economic Society and of the Council of the Royal Historical Society.

== Personal life ==
Knowles married one of her students in 1907 and they had a son. She was remembered for wearing brilliant colours and having a "fierce manner of expressing fierce opinions", including a belief in the "superiority of the British over all other races, of her beloved Cornwall over all other counties". She was diagnosed with cancer in 1924, and resigned to move to Cornwall and write. She died on 25 April 1926.

== Legacy ==
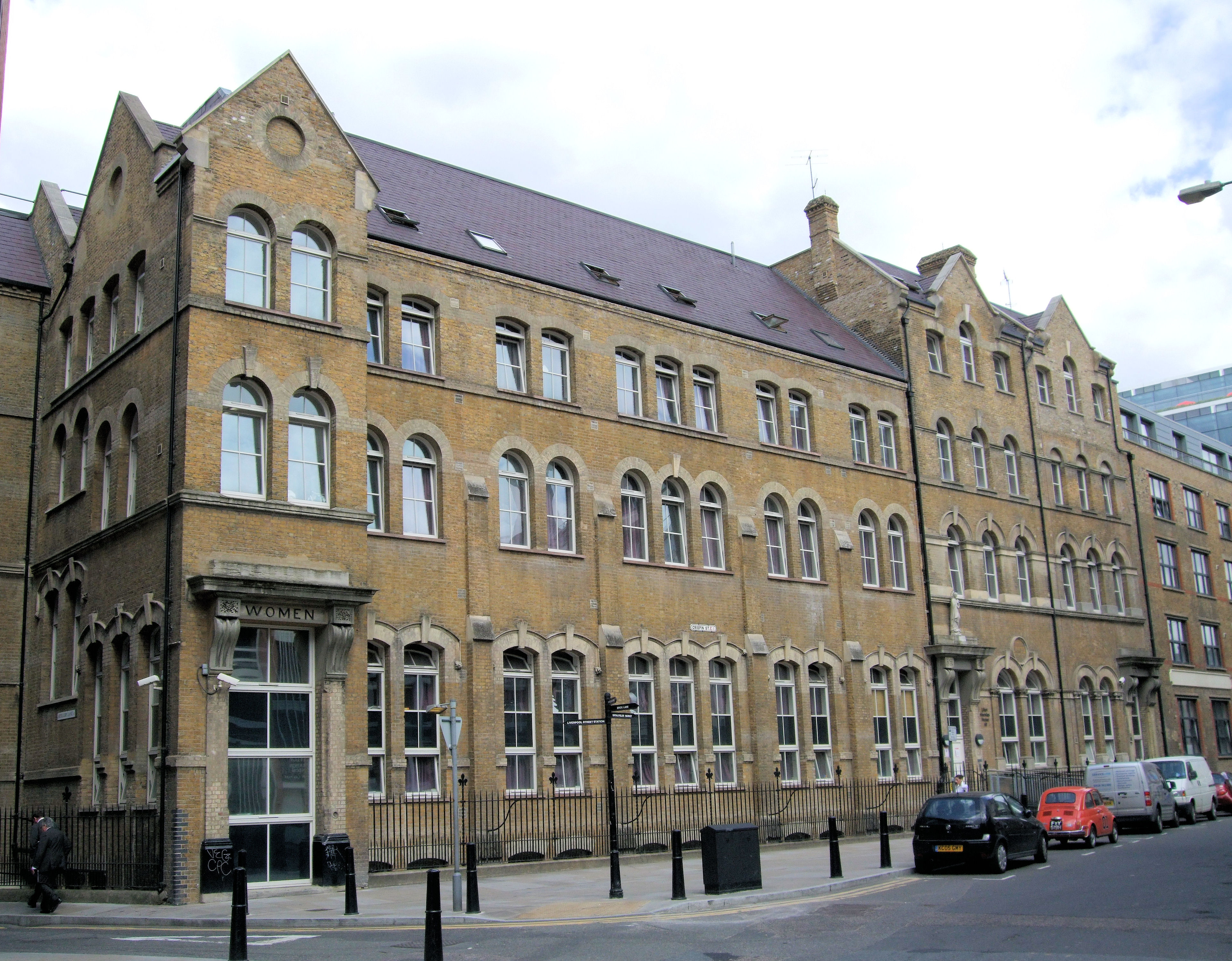
Lilian Knowles House is a student residence reserved for postgraduate students at the LSE

Since 2006, the LSE has had a 360-bedroom development reserved for their postgraduate students. The building is based on a Victorian building and it is now called the "Lilian Knowles House". There are also two student prizes named after her at LSE; one for the highest marks in the first year and one for the highest marks in the final year of the Economic History Undergraduate degree programme.

== Selected publications ==
- Knowles, Lilian Charlotte Anne. (1921). The industrial and commercial revolutions in Great Britain during the nineteenth century. London: Routledge.
- Knowles, Lillian Charlotte Anne. (1924). The economic development of the British overseas empire, London: Routledge.
