= Nicolas Xavier de Ricard =

French general and Governor of French colonial Saint Lucia

Governor of Saint Lucia
- In office 1793–1794
- Preceded by: Jean-Baptiste Raymond de Lacrosse
- Succeeded by: Charles Gordon

Personal details
- Born: 12 July 1726 Aix-en-Provence, Bouches-du-Rhône, France
- Died: 30 May 1812 (aged 85) Paris, France
- Occupation: Soldier

Nicolas Xavier de Ricard (12 July 1726 in Aix-en-Provence, Bouches-du-Rhône – 30 May 1812 in Paris), was a brigadier general of the French Revolution.

== Professional career ==
He became an engineer in April 1744 and served in Flanders until 1748 when he became lieutenant. He resumed service in the royal guards of Solas in 1757 and served under François de Chevert until 1762. He was appointed major in the Rothenburg regiment by Richelieu, and he was sent to Guadeloupe as a lieutenant colonel in December 1764. He served in Fort St. Louis from 1765 to 1768.

He was promoted to Field Marshal on 21 September 1788, and he became commander/Governor of the island of Saint Lucia in 1793. On 4 February 1794, he proclaimed the Decree for the Abolition of Slavery in the French Antilles. However, the British attacked and gained possession of Saint Lucia on 4 April 1794. De Ricard was forced to capitulate to the English, and became their prisoner. He was allowed to return to Le Havre, France on 21 December 1795, and retired on 27 January 1804.

== See also ==
- List of colonial governors and administrators of Saint Lucia
