= Portrait of Sir Edward Pellew =

Painting by Thomas Lawrence

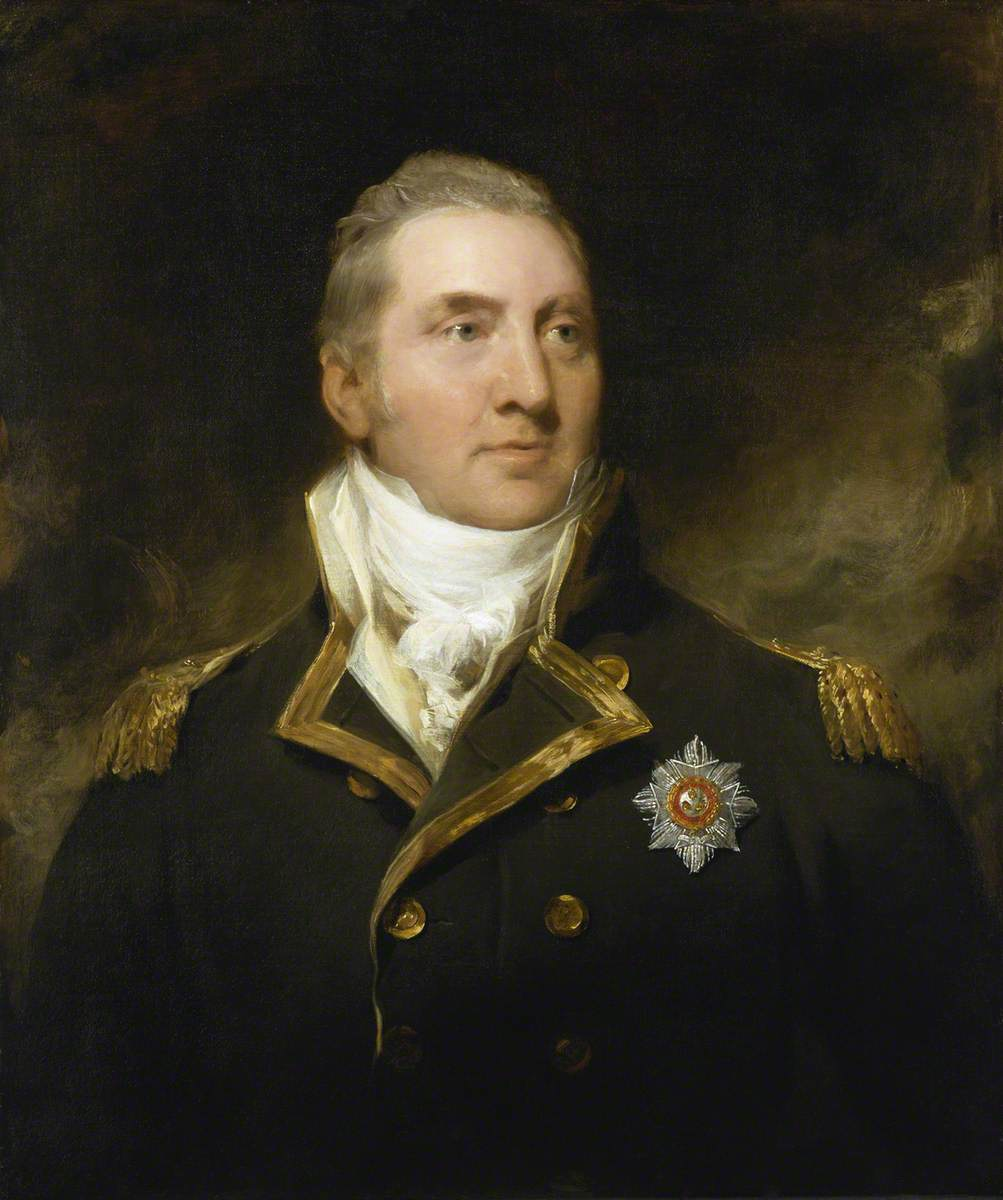
- Artist: Thomas Lawrence
- Year: c. 1797
- Type: Oil on canvas, portrait
- Dimensions: 76.6 cm × 64.2 cm (30.2 in × 25.3 in)
- Location: National Maritime Museum, Greenwich

Portrait of Sir Edward Pellew is a portrait painting by the English artist Thomas Lawrence of the British naval officer Sir Edward Pellew, produced around 1797.

== History and description ==
Pellew joined the Royal Navy as a boy in 1770 and served during numerous campaigns during the American Revolutionary War and French Revolutionary War. At the time Lawrence painted him Pellew had become known for his command of frigate HMS Indefatigable and it may commemorate a 1797 action fought against the much larger French ship Droits de l'Homme which was driven ashore and wrecked on the coast of Brittany. Pellew won popular acclaim for the Bombardment of Algiers in 1816, a campaign to end the slavery practiced in North Africa.

Lawrence was an established young portrait painter and later became President of the Royal Academy. Pellew is shown wearing the full dress uniform of a captain. Lawrence's portrait was the basis for an 1815 mezzotint print by Charles Turner, part of the collection of the National Portrait Gallery. The gallery also has a later 1804 portrait of Pellew by James Northcote.

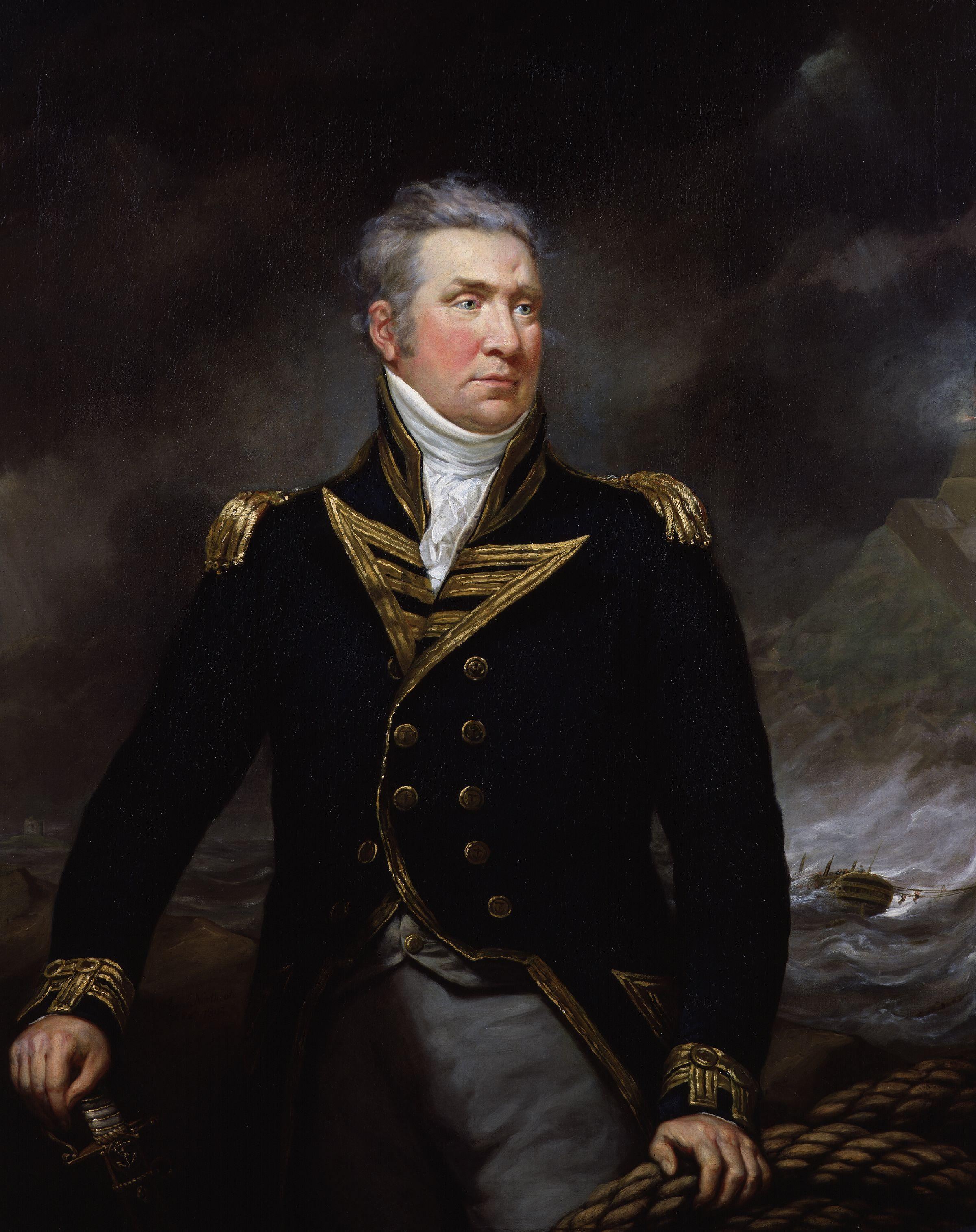
Portrait of Pellew by James Northcote, 1804.

Lawrence's portrait belonged to Edward Hawke Locker who acted as civil secretary for Pellew and was possibly given it as a gift by Pellew. It is part of the collection of the National Maritime Museum in Greenwich.

== Bibliography ==
- Davey, James. In Nelson's Wake: The Navy and the Napoleonic Wars. Yale University Press, 2016.
- Taylor, Steven. Commander: The Life and Exploits of Britain's Greatest Frigate Captain. Faber & Faber, 2012.
