= Robert Carthew Reynolds =

Royal Navy rear admiral (1745–1811)

Rear-Admiral Robert Carthew Reynolds
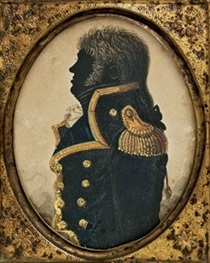
- Robert Carthew Reynolds by John Buncombe
- Born: bap. 30 July 1745; Lamorran, Cornwall
- Died: 24 December 1811 (aged 66); HMS St George, off Jutland
- Military career
- Allegiance: United Kingdom
- Branch: Royal Navy
- Service years: 1759–1811
- Rank: Rear-Admiral
- Commands: 2nd-in-Command, Baltic Fleet
- Conflicts: Seven Years' War; Battle of Quiberon Bay; American Revolutionary War; French Revolutionary Wars; Action of 13 January 1797; Napoleonic Wars

Rear-Admiral Robert Carthew Reynolds (bap. 30 July 1745 – 24 December 1811) was a long serving and widely respected officer of the British Royal Navy who served in four separate major wars in a 52-year career. During this time he saw only one major battle, although was engaged in one of the most noted frigate actions of the French Revolutionary Wars, the destruction of the Droits de l'Homme, in which his own frigate was driven ashore and wrecked. Reynolds died in 1811 during a great storm in late December, which scattered his convoy and wrecked three ships of the line including his own flagship HMS St George. Over 2,000 British sailors, including Reynolds, were drowned.

== Early career and family ==
Reynolds was born in the village of Lamorran in Cornwall in 1745. His exact date of birth is unknown, but he was baptised on 30 July to parents John and Elizabeth Reynolds. Robert Reynolds joined the Royal Navy at 14, under Captain George Edgcumbe in HMS Hero during the Seven Years' War. A few months after joining the ship, Hero was engaged in the Battle of Quiberon Bay at which a French fleet was destroyed. Although there is no direct proof of his presence at the action, it is likely that Reynolds was on board and witnessed the engagement first hand. Reynolds remained with the ship for several years and during the 1760s served on HMS Brilliant, HMS Pearl and HMS Venus, becoming a midshipman and passing the lieutenant's exam in 1770.

Due to the restrictions in the size of the peacetime navy, Reynolds was not actually promoted to lieutenant until 1777, following the outbreak of the American Revolutionary War. Reynolds saw action in the war, remaining aboard HMS Royal George, HMS Barfleur and HMS Britannia in the Channel Fleet until 1783 when he sailed for the West Indies as commander of the storeship HMS Dolphin. In 1786 he took over the sloop HMS Echo on the Newfoundland Station and in 1788 returned to Europe, being promoted and made temporary captain of HMS Barfleur at the Spanish emergency in 1790.

He married, at Cardinham, Cornwall 7 December 1779, Jane, daughter of John Vivian. They had at least three children.

== Wars with France ==
In 1795, Reynolds was called out of half-pay in Penair near Truro and given command of the frigate HMS Druid. A year later he moved to HMS Amazon, in which he served under Sir Edward Pellew in HMS Indefatigable. In Pellew's squadron, Reynolds participated in the capture of the French frigate Unité. He was still under Pellew in the action of 13 January 1797 when Amazon, in company with HMS Indefatigable, engaged and drove ashore the much larger French ship of the line Droits de l'Homme. In the heavy storm in which the battle was fought, Amazon became unmanageable and was also wrecked, although the frigate was beached and all but six of her men survived, unlike her larger opponent which was run on a sandbar and destroyed with hundreds of lives lost.

Reynolds and his crew were made prisoners on reaching the shore, but less than a year later he was exchanged and returned to Britain, being honourably acquitted at a court-martial into the loss of his ship. Reynolds was given command of the large prize frigate HMS Pomone and in her operated in the Bay of Biscay during which time he captured several enemy privateers, including the Cheri in 1798. In 1800, he was given command of the ship of the line HMS Cumberland. In 1801, Reynolds transferred to HMS Orion, but was placed in reserve during the Peace of Amiens, being given command of the Cornish sea fencibles until 1804. In the same year his eldest son, also named Robert, was killed in action with the French off Martinique. His younger son Barrington Reynolds also served in the Royal Navy and later became a highly respected admiral in his own right.

=== Christmas storm of 1811 ===
In 1804 Reynolds returned to the sea in HMS Dreadnought, moving soon afterwards into HMS Princess Royal in which he remained until 1807. In 1808 Reynolds was made a rear-admiral, and in 1810 was ordered to the Baltic Sea as second-in-command to James Saumarez. Reynolds raised his flag in HMS St George. He remained in the Baltic until 1811, when on 1 November he took command of a large convoy from Hanö to England. The weather was extremely bad, and the convoy failed to pass through the Skagerrak three times before finally managing in mid-November. As they sheltered close to Jutland, storms drove dozens of the convoy ashore, and one loose merchant ship collided with St George, tearing away anchors and beaching the flagship, which was badly damaged.

St George was refloated and underwent a month of repairs, escorted by ships of the line HMS Defence and HMS Cressy. On 17 December the battered flagship returned to sea, Reynolds hoping to reach Britain before the weather worsened further. Seven days later however, on Christmas Eve, the remains of the convoy was struck by the biggest storm in the North Sea in many years. St George, Defence and numerous other ships were flung onto the reefs on Jutland's western coast, where they were broken up by the heavy seas. Of St George's 850 crew only 12 survived, Reynolds not among them. All but six of Defence's crew were drowned and only Cressy escaped the disaster. Hours later another large British convoy was driven onto the Haak Sands off the Texel, bringing the death toll in the Royal Navy alone to over 2,000. Reynolds's last moments were recorded by survivor John Anderson, who recounted that the admiral had remained below decks after the ship had struck and was only brought on deck, having been seriously injured, when the sea flooded his cabin. Just a few hours later he was dead, succumbing to exposure with over 500 of his crew. An attempt was made some days later to recover his remains, but they were not found, the deck having been washed away by the high seas. His remains are probably interred with the other bodies which washed ashore over the next weeks in an area now known as "Dead Men's Dunes".

== Home ==
Penair House in the parish of St Clement, Cornwall was built by Rear-Admiral Robert Carthew Reynolds (d. 1811) and was the residence of his son Barrington Reynolds. This house replaced an older one at least going back as far as the 17th century.

A fine monument in St Clement parish church commemorates the Rear-Admiral: it is from the studio of Micali, Leghorn, and shows a young soldier and two women, the soldier points to a monument with a naval battle, above is the portrait medallion. Arthur Mee suggests that the figures represent his children but if he had two sons this is unlikely. His eldest son predeceased him on active service during the Napoleonic Wars; his second son Barrington suffered in his youth from severe bouts of ill-health.
