= HMS Indefatigable (1784) =

Frigate of the Royal Navy

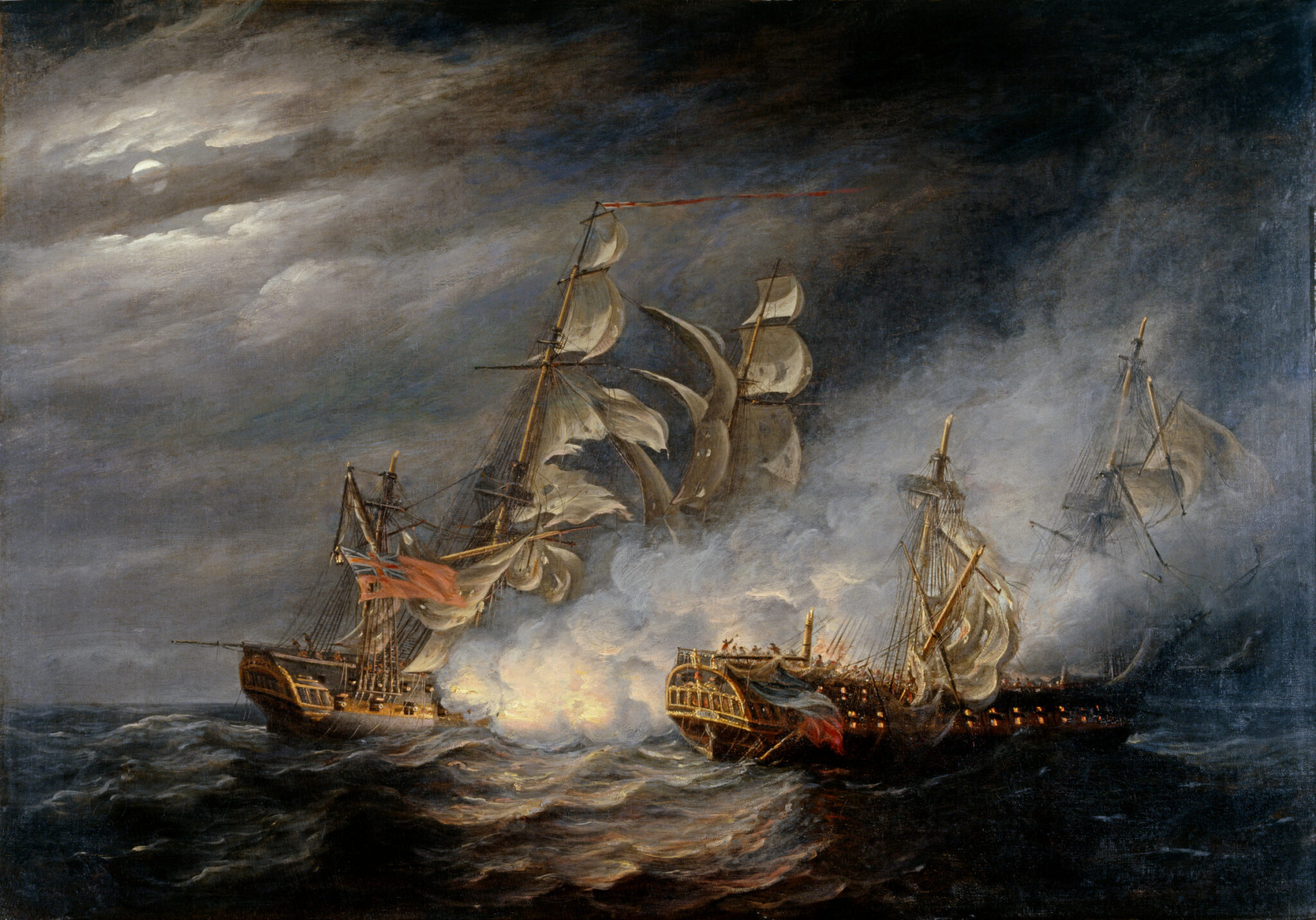
- Indefatigable (left) at the action of 21 April 1796

History

Great Britain
- Name: HMS Indefatigable
- Ordered: 3 August 1780
- Builder: Henry Adams, Bucklers Hard
- Laid down: May 1781
- Launched: July 1784
- Commissioned: December 1794
- Honours and awards: Naval General Service Medal with clasps: "Indefatigable 20 Apl. 1796"; "Indefatigable 13 Jany. 1797"; "16 July Boat Service 1806"; "Basque Roads 1809"
- Fate: Broken up at Chatham, March 1816
- Notes: Razeed to 44 guns between September 1794 and February 1795

General characteristics
- Class & type: Ardent-class ship of the line
- Tons burthen: 1384 3/94 (bm)
- Length: 160 ft 1 1/4 in (48.8 m) (gundeck); 131 ft 10 3/4 in (40.2 m) (keel)
- Beam: 44 ft 5 in (13.5 m)
- Depth of hold: 19 ft (5.8 m) (as frigate, 13 ft 3 in (4.0 m))
- Propulsion: Sails
- Sail plan: Full-rigged ship
- Complement: 310 officers and men (as frigate)
- Armament: As built: Gundeck: 26 × 24-pounder guns; Upper gun deck: 26 × 12-pounder guns; QD: 10 × 4-pounder guns; Fc: 2 × 9-pounder guns; As frigate: Gundeck: 26 × 24-pounder guns; QD: 8 × 12-pounder guns + 4 × 42-pounder carronades; Fc: 4 × 12-pounder guns + 2 × 42-pounder carronades

HMS Indefatigable was one of the Ardent-class 64-gun third-rate ships-of-the-line designed by Sir Thomas Slade in 1761 for the Royal Navy. She was built as a ship-of-the-line, but most of her active service took place after her conversion to a 44-gun razee frigate. She had a long career under several distinguished commanders, serving throughout the French Revolutionary Wars and the Napoleonic Wars. She took some 27 prizes, alone or in company, and the Admiralty authorised the issue of four clasps to the Naval General Service Medal in 1847 to any surviving members of her crews from the respective actions. She was broken up in 1816.

== Construction ==
Indefatigable was ordered on 3 August 1780 (long after Slade's death), and her keel was laid down in May 1781 at the Bucklers Hard shipyard in Hampshire owned by Henry Adams. She was launched in early July 1784 and completed from 11 July to 13 September of that year at Portsmouth Dockyard as a 64-gun two-decked third rate for the Royal Navy. She had cost £25,210 4s 5d to build; her total initial cost including fitting out and coppering was £36,154 18s 7d. By that time, she was already anachronistic for the role of a ship of the line as the French only built the more powerful 74-gun ships, and was never commissioned in that role.

=== Design modification ===
In 1794, she was razéed; her upper gun deck was cut away to convert her into a large and heavily armed frigate. The original intention was to retain her twenty-six 24-pounder guns on her gundeck, and to mount eight 12-pounder guns on her quarterdeck and a further four on her forecastle, which would have rated her as a 38-gun vessel. However, it was at this time that the carronade was becoming more popular in the Navy, and her intended armament was altered on 5 December 1794 with the addition of four 42-pounder carronades to go on her quarterdeck and two on her forecastle. Indefatigable was thereafter rated as a 44-gun fifth-rate frigate, along with Magnanime and Anson, which were converted at about the same time. The work was carried out at Portsmouth from September 1794 to February 1795 at a cost of £8,764. On 17 February 1795, a further two 12-pounder guns were added to her quarterdeck, though her official rating remained unchanged.

== French Revolutionary Wars ==
=== Captain Sir Edward Pellew ===
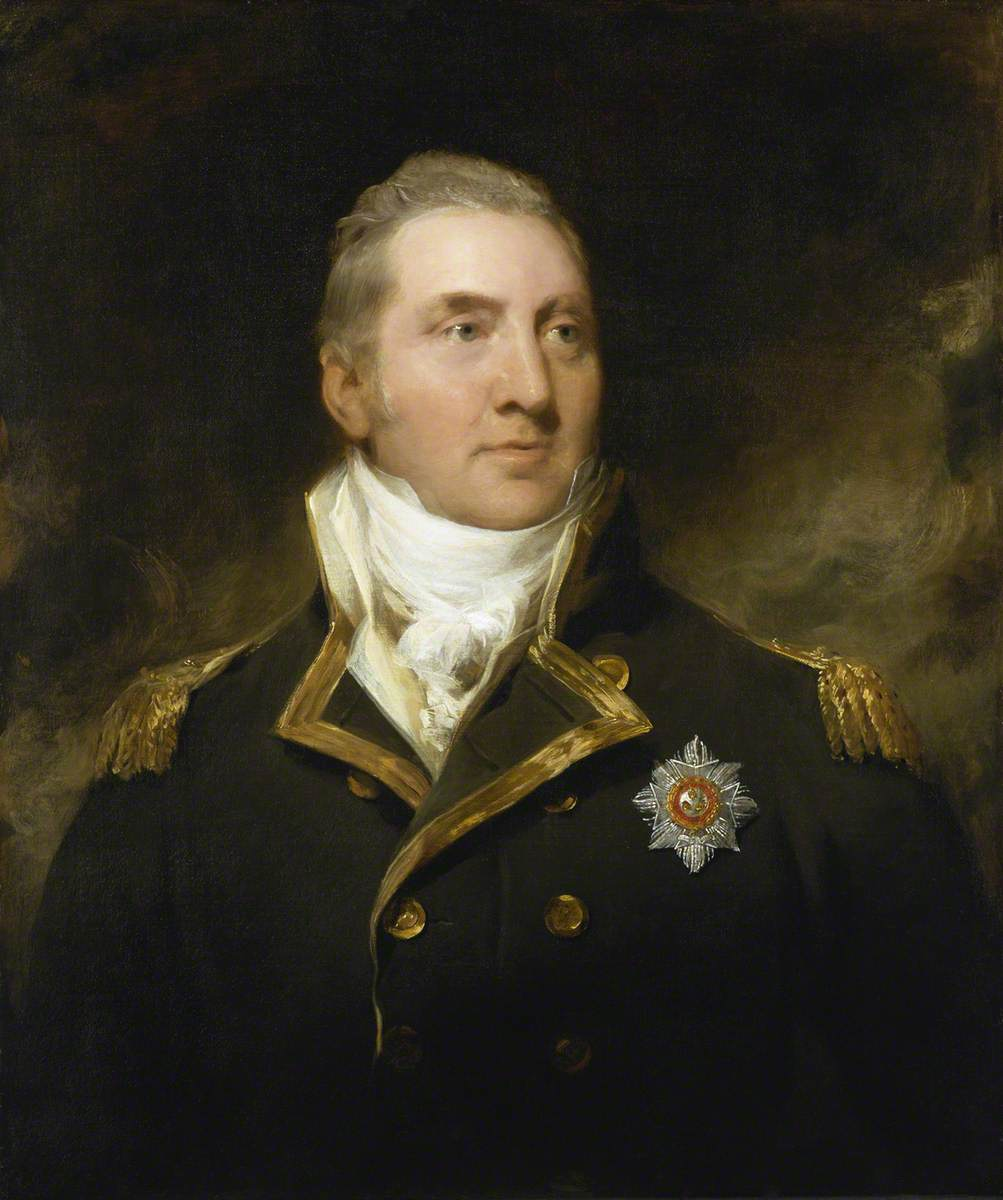
Portrait of Sir Edward Pellew by Thomas Lawrence, 1797.

Indefatigable was first commissioned in December 1794 under Captain Sir Edward Pellew. He commanded her until early 1799.

On 9 March 1795, Indefatigable, Concorde, and Jason captured numerous French prizes: Temeraire, Minerve, Gentille, Regeneration, and a brig and sloop of unknown names. In October, the Dutch East Indiaman Zeelilee was wrecked in the Isles of Scilly with the loss of 25 of her 70 crew. Indefatigable rescued the survivors.

On 20 March 1796, Indefatigable and her squadron chased three French corvettes, of which the Volage of 26 guns ran ashore under a battery at the mouth of the Loire. Volage lost her masts in running ashore, but the French were later able to refloat her. Her two consorts Sagesse and Eclatant escaped into the river. In this action, Amazon had four men wounded.

Between 11 and 21 March Indefatigable's squadron captured the vessels Favorite Sultana, Friends, Providence, Four Marys, Aimable Justine, and Nouvelle Union. They also destroyed two unnamed brigs and a chasse maree. The vessels sharing in the prize money were: Indefatigable, Concorde, Révolutionnaire, Amazon, Argo, and the hired armed cutter Dolly and hired armed lugger Duke of York.

On 13 April 1796, Indefatigable was in pursuit of a French frigate. Pellew signalled to Révolutionnaire to cut her off from the shore. Révolutionnaire then captured the French frigate Unité after having fired two broadsides into her. Unité had nine men killed and 11 wounded; Révolutionnaire had no casualties. The Royal Navy took the frigate into service as HMS Unite.

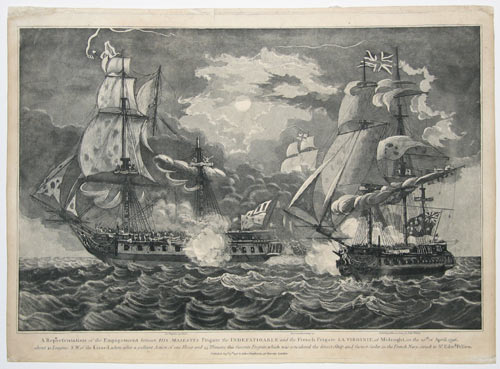
Virginie fighting HMS Indefatigable

On the morning of 20 April 1796, Indefatigable sighted the French 44-gun frigate Virginie off the Lizard. Indefatigable, Amazon, and Concorde chased Virginie, with Indefatigable catching her just after midnight on 21 April after a chase of 15 hours and 168 miles (270 km). After an hour and three quarters of fighting, she still had not struck and had somewhat outmaneuvered Indefatigable when Concorde arrived. Seeing that she was outnumbered, Virginie struck.

Virginie carried 44 guns, 18 and 9-pounders, and had a crew of 340 men under the command of Citizen Bergeret, Capitaine de Vaisseau. She had 14 or 15 men killed, 17 badly wounded, and 10 slightly. She also had four feet of water in her hold from shot holes. Indefatigable had no casualties. Pellew sent Virginie into Plymouth under the escort of Concorde, and followed the next day with Amazon, which had sustained some damage. The Royal Navy took Virginie into service as Virginie.

In July 1796, there was an initial distribution of £20,000 of prize money for the capture of Unite and Virginie. Indefatigable shared this with Amazon, Révolutionnaire, Concorde, and Argo. Apparently, Duke of York also shared in some or all of the prize money. In 1847, the Admiralty authorised the issue of the Naval General Service Medal with clasp "Indefatigable 20 Apl. 1796".

On 12 June, Indefatigable, Amazon, Concorde, Revolutionaire, and Phoebe took two French brigs off Ushant – the Trois Couleurs and the Blonde (alias Betsey) – after a chase of 24 hours. Trois Couleurs carried 10 guns and a crew of 70. (Note: Trois Couleurs was a Montagne-class cutter built at Saint-Malo and launched in October 1793.) Blonde had 16 guns and a crew of 95 men. (Note: The French had captured Blonde about a month earlier. She may have been the Betsey of 206 tons (bm) and sixteen 6-pounder guns, William Crebbin master, which had received a letter of marque on 23 June 1795.) Each was under the command of an ensign de vaisseau and both vessels had left Brest two days earlier for a six-week cruise, but had not yet taken any prizes.

In September 1796, Indefatigable, Phoebe, Révolutionnaire, and Amazon captured five Spanish ships.

On 1 October, Indefatigable, Amazon, Révolutionnaire, Phoebe, and Jason shared in the capture of the Vrow Delenea Maria. The next day, Pellew and Indefatigable captured the privateer schooner Ariel of Boston off Corunna. Earlier, Pellew had recaptured the brig Queen of Naples, which had been sailing from Lisbon to Cork. From her, he learned that there were two privateers around Corunna, one of which had captured a brig from Lisbon with a cargo of bale goods two days earlier. Pellew immediately set off towards Corunna and was able to intercept the Ariel. She had 12 guns and a crew of 75 men. She was 14 days out of Bordeaux. Her consort, the schooner Vengeur, was of the same strength, and Pellew yet hoped to catch her, too. The brig from Bristol, however, had made it into the port of Ferrol, where Pellew had earlier chased two French frigates.

In January 1797, Indefatigable and Amazon captured the packet Sangossee. On 7 January, Indefatigable and Amazon captured the Emanuel. Later that month, Indefatigable fought her most famous battle.

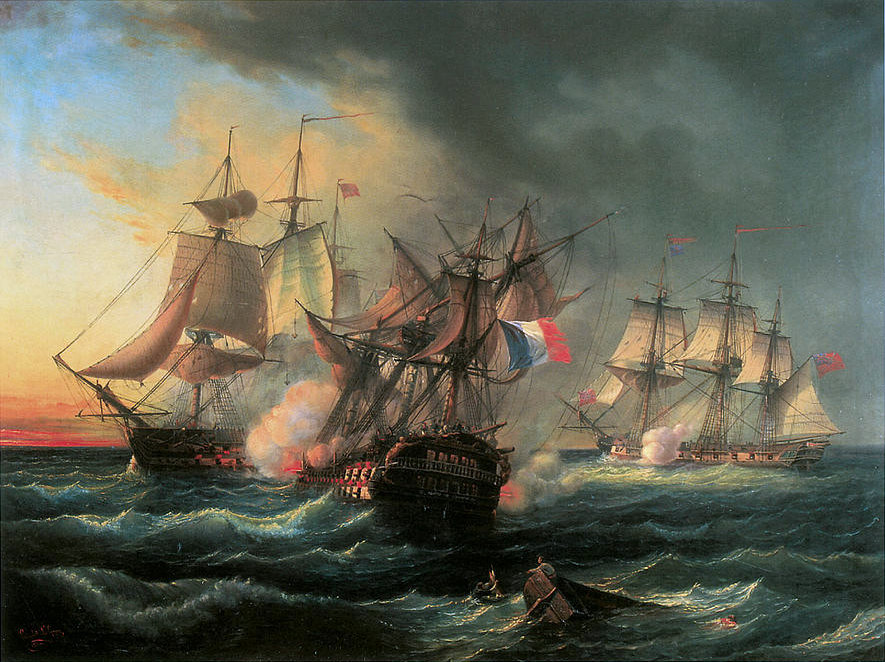
Fight of the Indefatigable (left) and Droits de l'Homme, as depicted by Léopold le Guen (1853)

The Action of 13 January 1797 was an engagement off the Penmarks involving the two frigates Indefatigable and Amazon against the French Droits de l'Homme, a 74-gun ship of the line. The battle ended with Droits de l'Homme being driven onto shore in a gale. Amazon also ran onto the shore; still, almost her entire crew survived both the battle and the grounding and were captured. Despite being embayed and having damaged masts and rigging, Indefatigable was able to repair the damage and beat off the lee shore, showing excellent seamanship. She had only 19 officers and men wounded, with most of those not being serious. This action resulted the award of the Naval General Service Medal with clasp "Indefatigable 13 Jany. 1797" for any crew surviving in 1847.

On 18 January Indefatigable was at Falmouth. There she saved all on board when a fire destroyed the American merchantman Indian Chief.

Subsequently, Indefatigable or Pellew's squadron took more vessels, including privateers, primarily in the Channel. Thus, Pellew reported that, on 30 April 1797, "we" captured the French brigantine privateer Basque. She was armed with eight guns and carried a crew of 50 men.

On 11 May, Indefatigable in company with Phoebe, Cleopatra, Childers, and Duke of York captured Nouvelle Eugénie. She was a razee privateer of 16 guns and carried a crew of 120 men. She was four days out of Nantes on a 30-day cruise, but had taken no prizes. The Royal Navy took her into service as HMS Eugenie.

On 21 July, the Duke of York returned, having chased a French privateer lugger into the hands of Lieutenant Bray, who commanded the Revenue Cutter Hind. Hind also recaptured a sloop that the privateer had captured. The lugger was armed with two guns and carried a crew of 25 men.

On 14 October, Indefatigable arrived at Teneriffe. There at midnight she captured the French brig corvette Ranger. Ranger was armed with 14 guns and carried a crew of 70 men. She had been carrying dispatches to the West Indies, which she was able to destroy before capture. The next day, Pellew captured a Spanish schooner carrying a cargo of fish. Indefatigable was short of water, so he put the crew of Ranger on board the schooner (though not Ranger's officers) and sent them ashore at Santa Cruz.

Ten days after that, Indefatigable captured the privateer Hyène after a chase of eight hours. She was armed with twenty-four 9-pounder guns and had a crew of 230 men. She was two weeks out of Bayonne but had not captured anything. Hyène had apparently mistaken Indefatigable for a vessel from Portuguese India. Pellew estimated that, had she not lost her foretopmast in the chase, she might have escaped. She had been the post-ship Hyaena until her capture in 1793; the Royal Navy took her back into service under her original name.

Indefatigable returned to the Channel. On 11 January 1798, she was in company with Cambrian and Childers when they captured the French privateer schooner Vengeur. Vengeur was a new vessel of 12 guns and 72 men. She was eight days out of Ostend but had taken no prizes. Pellew sent her into Falmouth.

Five days later, in the evening of the 16th, Pellew's squadron captured the French privateer Inconcevable. She was armed with eight guns and had a crew of 55 men. She was 10 days out of Dunkirk and had taken nothing. Prize money was paid to Indefatigable, Cambrian, and Success.

On 28 January, Indefatigable and Cambrian captured the privateer Heureuse Nouvelle. She was armed with 22 guns and had a crew of 130 men. She was 36 days out of Brest and, during that time, had captured only one ship, a large American vessel named the Providence which had a cargo of cotton and sugar. Pellew sent Cambrian in pursuit. Duke of York also shared in the capture.

On 30 April 1798, Indefatigable captured the brigantine privateer Basque. She was armed with eight guns and had a crew of 50 men. Indefatigable and Cleopatra captured the Hope on 11 July.

At daylight on 4 August, Indefatigable sighted the privateer Heureux together with a prize and gave chase. The two separated, with the prize heading directly for Bayonne. After a chase of 32 hours on a great circular route, Indefatigable and her quarry found themselves off Bayonne where Indefatigable intercepted the prize and captured her. The privateer was the Heureux, of 16 guns and 112 men. Her prize was the Canada, John Sewell Master, which had been sailing from Jamaica to London, having stopped in Charlestown, with a cargo of sugar, rum, and coffee. Pellew exchanged prisoners, taking off the crew of the Canada and putting on her the crew of Heureux. He then drove Canada on shore where he hoped that her cargo at least would be destroyed.

Indefatigable captured the French corvette Vaillante while cruising in the Bay of Biscay on 8 August, after a chase of 24 hours, which was under the command of Lieutenant de Vaisseau La Porte. The corvette fired a few shots before she struck. She was armed with twenty-two 9-pounder guns and had a crew of 175 men. She had left Rochefort on 1 August, and the Île de Ré on the 4th, where she had picked up 25 banished priests, 27 convicts, and a Madame Rovere and family, all of whom she was taking to Cayenne. She was only 18 months old, coppered, and a fast sailer. The British took her into service as Danae. On 15 November 1798, Indefatigable captured Mercurius.

At dawn on 31 December 1798, Indefatigable captured the Minerve, five leagues off Ushant. She was armed with 16 guns and carried a crew of 140 men. She was four weeks out of Saint-Malo and was waiting to enter Brest when captured. She had taken several prizes, one of which, the Asphalon, Indefatigable captured on 1 January 1799. Aspahalon, a Newcastle vessel, had been sailing from Halifax to London with a cargo of sugar, coffee, and tobacco. Other vessels which Minerve had captured included Martinus (Bremen brig), Tagus (Portuguese brig ), Minerva (English snow), and Ann and Dorothea (aka Beata Maria, Danish schooner).

On 14 January 1799, Indefatigable recaptured Argo, Rich, master, which had been sailing from Gothenburg for Boston when a French privateer had captured her. After her recapture Argo arrived at Falmouth.

More captures or recaptures of merchantmen followed. Indefatigable, Melpomene, and Nymphe recaptured the Providence on 10 January 1799, the Pomona on 5 February, and the Wohlfarden on 9 February. (Note: Pellew had been captain of Nymphe in 1793–94.)

=== Subsequent commanders ===
From March 1799 until the end of 1800 Indefatigable was under the command of Captain Henry Curzon. On 31 May she captured the brig Vénus. Venus was armed with twelve 4-pounder guns and two 9-pounders, and carried a crew of 101 men. She was nine weeks out of Rochefort and had captured two prizes, the schooner Clarence, sailing from Lisbon to London, and a ship from Lisbon sailing to Hamburg with a cargo of salt. Indefatigable was apparently also in company with Fisgard and Diamond.

On 9 October 1799 Indefatigable, Diamond, Cambrian, Stag, Nymphe and Cerberus shared in the capture of the Spanish brig Nostra Senora de la Solidad. Then on 7 November Nymphe, Indefatigable and Diamond shared in the recapture of the ship Brailsford.

Then on 6 January 1800 Indefatigable shared with Defiance, Unicorn, Sirius and Stag in the capture of the French brig Ursule. On 11 February Indefatigable captured the Vidette.

On 12 June 1800, Indefatigable captured the French privateer brig Vengeur. She was armed with six long 4-pounders and ten 18-pounder carronades, and carried a crew of 102 men. She was two days out of Bordeaux and sailing for the coast of Brazil. Vengeur was sailing in company with three letters of marque – a ship, a brig and a schooner – that were bound for Guadeloupe. On 11 June Vengeur had captured the Jersey-privateer lugger Snake. (Note: When the crew of Vengeur came ashore one of the men from Venguer was discovered to have been one of the mutineers on Danae, which Indefatiagble had captured in 1798, and which had suffered a mutiny in 1800. The mutineer was seized, court martialled and hanged.) Indefatigable shared the prize money with Sirius.

On 3 July Indefatigable recaptured the brig Cultivator, from the French. Eleven days later, Indefatigable and Sirius captured the French ship Favori. The next day Bordelais (or Bourdelois) captured the Phoenix. Indefatigable, Sirius and Boadicea shared with Bordelais by agreement, and Shannon further shared with Bordelais.

Indefatigable then was with Sir John Borlase Warren's squadron at Ferrol. She apparently did not participate in the attack on a fort at the bay of Playa de Dominos (Doniños) on 25 August 1800.

On 22 October Indefatigable, took the French 28-gun frigate Vénus off the Portuguese coast. Indefatigable had been chasing Venus from the morning when in the afternoon Fisgard came in sight and forced Venus to turn. Both British vessels arrived at Venus at almost the same time (7pm). Venus was armed with 32-guns and had a crew of 200 men. She was sailing from Rochefort to Senegal. Indefatigable and Fisgard shared the prize money with Boadicea, Diamond, Urania, and the hired armed schooner Earl St Vincent.

In January 1801 Indefatigable was under Captain Matthew Scott. Indefatigable was part of the squadron that shared by agreement in the prize money from the Temeraire, which Dasher had captured on 30 May. Similarly, the same vessels shared by agreement in Dasher's capture of Bien Aimé on 23 July 1801. Indefatigable was then paid off later that year. Indefatigable was laid up in ordinary at Plymouth in March to April 1802, as a result of the peace of October 1801.

== Napoleonic Wars ==
Following the resumption of hostilities, Indefatigable was fitted out for sea between July and September 1803. She was recommissioned under Captain Graham Moore, younger brother of Sir John Moore of Rifle Brigade and Corunna fame.

On 9 August 1804 Indefatigable was in sight when HMS Nautilus recaptured the West Indiaman William Heathcote off Bayonne.

=== Action of 5 October 1804 ===
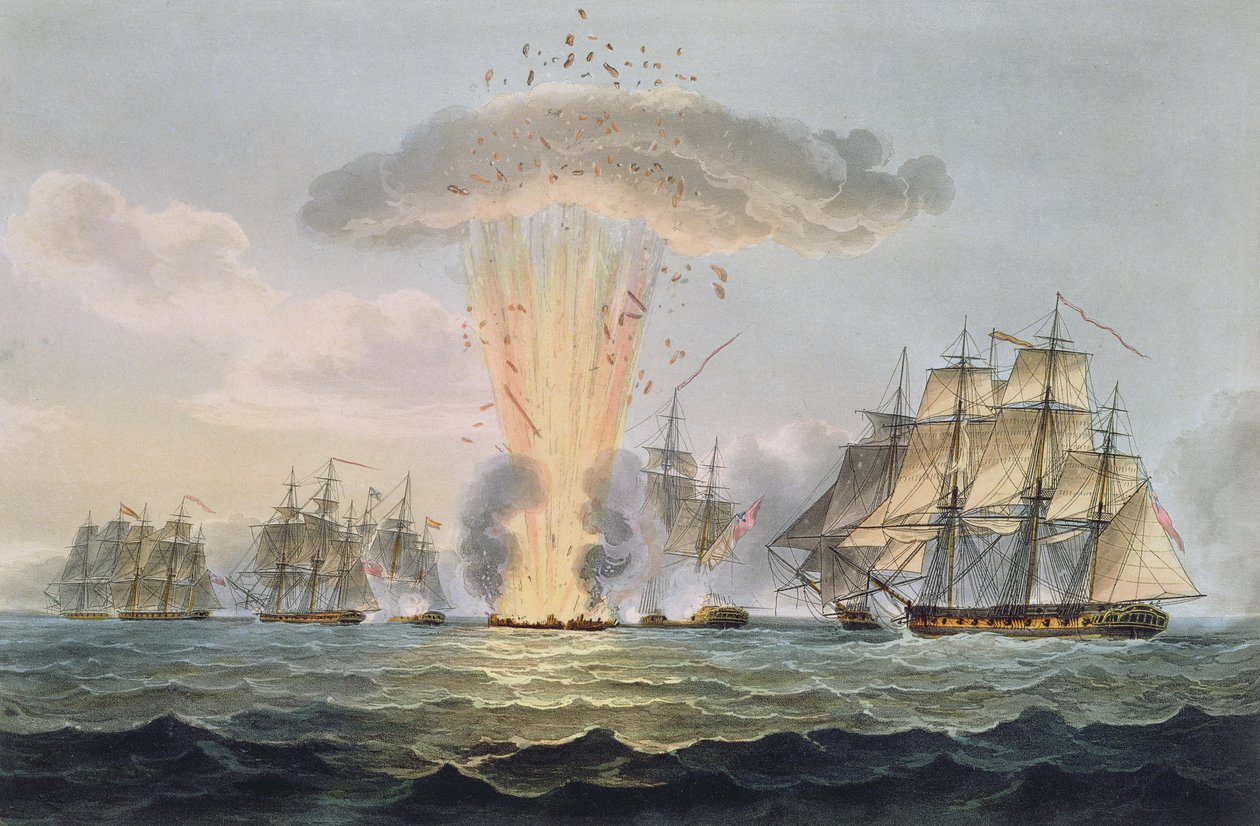
Capture and destruction of four Spanish frigates, 5 October 1804, the battle of Cabo de Santa María

Indefatigable, with Moore as commodore, and frigates Medusa, Lively, and Amphion intercepted four Spanish frigates off Cadiz under the command of Rear-Admiral Don Joseph Bustamente, Knight of the Order of St. James, on 5 October 1804. They were carrying bullion from Montevideo, South America to Spain. Spain was a neutral country at the time, but was showing strong signs of declaring war in alliance with Napoleonic France. Acting on Admiralty orders, Moore required the Spaniards to change their course and sail for England. Admiral Bustamente refused and a short engagement ensued.

First Mercedes blew up. Then Indefatigable captured Medée, and Lively captured Clara. After a further chase, Lively and Medusa captured Fama.

- Medée the flagship was armed with forty-two 18-pounder guns on her main deck and had a crew of 300 men. She lost two men killed and 10 wounded.
- Fama, the Commodore's ship, was armed with thirty-six 12-pounder guns on her main deck and had a crew of 180 men. She lost 11 killed and 50 wounded.
- Clara was armed with thirty-six 12-pounder guns on her main deck and had a crew of 300 men. She lost seven killed and 20 wounded.
- Mercedes was armed with thirty-six 12-pounder guns on her main deck and had a crew of 280 men. After she exploded, the British were only able to rescue her second captain and 40 men.

Indefatigable had no casualties. Amphion had five men wounded, one badly. Lively had two killed and four wounded. Indefatigable and Amphion escorted Medée and Fama to Plymouth. Medusa and Lively brought in Clara. The Royal Navy took Medea into service as Iphigenia and Clara as Leocadia.

The value of the treasure was very large and, if it had been treated as Prize of War, then Moore and his fellow captains would have become extremely wealthy. As it was, the money and ships were declared to be "Droits of Admiralty" on the grounds that war had not been declared. Hence the captains and crew shared a relatively small ex gratia payment of £160,000 for the bullion, plus the proceeds of the sale of the hull and cargo. (Note: For a seaman, the amount was £19 9s 11d. This probably represented about a year's wages.)

=== Normal operations ===
In October 1805 Indefatigable, now under Captain John Tremayne Rodd (−1809), was part of the blockade of Brest. One boat each from the ships of the line of the squadron, plus three boats each from Indefatigable and Iris entered the Gironde on 15 July 1806 to attack two French corvettes and a convoy. A change in the wind permitted all but one corvette to escape. The British captured the French corvette César (or Caesar), which the Royal Navy took into service as HMS Cesar. She was armed with 18 guns, had a crew of 86 men, and was under the command of Monsieur Louis Francois Hector Fourré, lieutenant de vaisseau. The French were expecting the attack and put up a strong resistance. The British lost six men killed, 36 wounded and 21 missing. Indefatigable alone lost two killed and 11 wounded. The 21 missing men were in a boat from Revenge; a later report suggested that most, if not all, had been taken prisoner. Most of the boats in the attack were so shot through that the British later abandoned them. The vessels claiming prize money included Pilchard and the hired armed lugger Nile, in addition to the various ships of the line and frigates. This cutting out expedition resulted in the participants qualifying for the Naval General Service Medal with clasp "16 July Boat Service 1806".

About a year later, on 19 October 1806, Indefatigable, Hazard, and Atalante captured the chasse marees Achille, Jenny, and Marianne. On 5 December 1807 Indefatigable captured the Pamelia. Then on the day after Christmas, Indefatigable and Tribune captured the American ship Eliza.

On 7 January 1808 Indefatigable and Tribune captured the French galiot Fanny and her cargo. (Note: The prize money for a seaman was 19s.)

Then on 31 July, Indefatigable, in company with the gun-brig Conflict, captured the letter of marque Diane, which was on her way to Île de France, carrying naval stores, as well as letters and dispatches that she threw overboard during the chase. She was six years old, had a burthen of 482 tons (bm), was armed with fourteen 9 and 6-pounder guns, and had a crew of 68 men. She had left the Gironde the evening before on this, her second voyage, to India.

On 19 August Indefatigable, still in company with Conflict, captured Adele. In December a distribution of £10,000 was payable for the proceeds from Diane and Adele. On 1 and 9 September 1808 Indefatigable captured two American ships, Sally and Peggy. Theseus and Impeteuex were in company with Indefatigable at the time. On 1 November Indefatigable captured Bonne Louise.

On 14 January 1809 Indefatigable captured French privateer lugger Clarisse in the Channel. She was pierced for 14 guns but had only three mounted. She had left Saint-Malo the evening before and had not made any captures. At the time of the capture, Amazon, Iris, Raleigh, and Goldfinch were in sight. They shared with Indefatigable in the proceeds for the hull, but not the bounty money for the captured crew. On 20 February Statira captured the French schooner Matilda. Indefatigable was in company.

Indefatigable arrived at the Basque Roads on 25 February. While there she captured two vessels, the Danish ship Neptunus on 24 March and the French ship Nymphe on 28 March. For the capture of Neptunus, Indefatigable was in company with the sloops Foxhound and Goldfinch. Foxhound was also in company for the capture of Nymphe.

In April 1809 Indefatigable participated in the battle of the Basque Roads. The action earned her crew another clasp to the Naval General Service Medal: "Basque Roads 1809".

In October 1809 Indefatigable was under Captain Henry E. R. Baker. Captain John Broughton succeeded him in December 1809 and remained in command until 1812.

On 11 January 1810, Indefatigable captured Mouche № 26 near Cap de Peñas. Under the command of Enseigne de vausseau provisorie Fleury, she had sailed from Pasajes with despatches for Île de France. The next day Mouche № 26 foundered near the Penmarks. Fleury, presumably among others, was drowned.

Four months later, on 6 May Indefatigable captured two French chasse marees, Camilla and Bonne Rencontre; Scipion and Piercer were in company. Next, Indefatigable recaptured Flora on 13 June. On 20 October Indefatigable re-captured the Portuguese brig Intrigua.

On 15 January 1811, Dryad captured Matilda and her cargo. Indefatigable and Lyra were in sight.

Then in June 1812, under Captain John Fyffe, Indefatigable was on the South American station, where she visited the Galápagos Islands. During this cruise she gave the second largest island, now known as Santa Cruz island, its English name – Indefatigable.

By July Indefatigable was back in Portsmouth. When news of the outbreak of the War of 1812 reached Britain, the Royal Navy seized all American vessels then in British ports. Indefatigable was among the Royal Navy vessels then lying at Spithead or Portsmouth and so entitled to share in the grant for the American ships Belleville, Janus, Aeos, Ganges, and Leonidas seized there on 31 July 1812. (Note: An ordinary seaman received 4s 1d; the Commander in Chief received £230 10s 8d.)

On 17 September Indefatigable, Hearty, Desiree, Drake, Primrose, and Cretan shared in the capture of Dankbarheide. When the gun-brig Hearty detained the Prussian vessel Friede on 29 September, Indefatigable, Desiree, Primrose, Cretan, Drake, were either in company or sharing by agreement.

Indefatigable was reported to have been at Lima on 11 July 1815, about to sail for the Galápagos Islands.

== Fate ==
Indefatigable was finally paid off in 1815. She was broken up at Sheerness in August 1816.

== Legacy ==
Indefatigable is the namesake of Indefatigable Island, the alternative English name of Santa Cruz Island in the Galapagos Archipelago.

== Prizes ==
Vessels captured or destroyed for which Indefatigable's crew received full or partial credit
Date	Ship	Nationality	Type	Fate	Ref.
9 March 1795	Temeraire	French	Merchant ship	Captured	
9 March 1795	Minerve	French	Merchant ship	Captured	
9 March 1795	Gentille	French	Merchant ship	Captured	
9 March 1795	Regeneration	French	Merchant ship	Captured	
9 March 1795	Not recorded	French	Merchant brig	Captured	
9 March 1795	Not recorded	French	Merchant sloop	Captured	
11–21 March 1795	Favorite Sultana	French	Merchant ship	Captured	
11–21 March 1795	Friends	French	Merchant brig	Captured	
11–21 March 1795	Not recorded	French	Merchant brig	Destroyed	
11–21 March 1795	Not recorded	French	Chasse maree	Destroyed	
11–21 March 1795	Providence	French	Chasse maree	Captured	
11–21 March 1795	Not recorded	French	Merchant brig	Destroyed	
11–21 March 1795	Four Marys	French	Merchant brig	Captured	
11–21 March 1795	Aimable Justine	French	Merchant brig	Captured	
11–21 March 1795	Nouvelle Union	French	Merchant brig	Captured	
13 April 1796	Unité	French	32-gun frigate	Captured	
21 April 1796	Virginie	French	44-gun frigate	Captured	
12 June 1796	Trois Couleurs	French	10-gun brig	Captured	
12 June 1796	Blonde	French	16-gun brig	Captured	
September 1796	Not recorded	Spanish	Merchant ship	Captured	
September 1796	Not recorded	Spanish	Merchant ship	Captured	
September 1796	Not recorded	Spanish	Merchant ship	Captured	
September 1796	Not recorded	Spanish	Merchant ship	Captured	
September 1796	Not recorded	Spanish	Merchant ship	Captured	
1 October 1796	Vrow Delenea Maria	Dutch	Merchant ship	Captured	
2 October 1796	Queen of Naples	British	Merchant brig	Recaptured	
2 October 1796	Ariel	French	12-gun privateer schooner	Captured	
2 October 1796	Revanche	French	Not recorded	Captured	
January 1797	Sangossee	French	Packet	Captured	
13 January 1797	Droits de l'Homme	French	74-gun ship of the line	Destroyed	
30 April 1797	Basque	French	8-gun privateer brigantine	Captured	
11 May 1797	Nouvelle Eugénie	French	16-gun privateer razee	Captured	
14 October 1797	Ranger	French	14-gun brig corvette	Captured	
15 October 1797	Not recorded	Spanish	Merchant schooner	Captured	
25 October 1797	Hyène	French	24-gun privateer	Captured	
11 January 1798	Vengeur	French	12-gun privateer schooner	Captured	
16 January 1798	Inconcevable	French	8-gun privateer	Captured	
28 January 1798	Heureuse Nouvelle	French	22-gun privateer	Captured	
30 April 1798	Basque	French	8-gun brigantine privateer	Captured	
11 July 1798	Hope	Not recorded	Not recorded	Captured	
4 August 1798	Heureux	French	16-gun privateer	Captured	
5 August 1798	Canada	British	Merchant ship	Recaptured, destroyed	
8 August 1798	Vaillante	French	22-gun corvette	Captured	
15 November 1798	Mercurius	Not recorded	Merchant ship	Captured	
31 December 1798	Minerve	French	16-gun privateer	Captured	
1 January 1799	Asphalon	British	Merchant ship	Recaptured	
10 January 1799	Providence	British	Merchant ship	Recaptured	
14 January 1799	Argo	British	Merchant ship	Recaptured	
January 1799	Ann and Dorothea	Danish	Merchant schooner	Recaptured	
5 February 1799	Pomona	British	Merchant ship	Recaptured	
9 February 1799	Wohlfarden	Not recorded	Merchant ship	Recaptured	
31 May 1799	Vénus	French	12-gun brig	Captured	
9 October 1799	Nostra Senora de la Solidad	Spanish	Merchant brig	Captured	
7 November 1799	Brailsford	British	Merchant ship	Recaptured	
6 January 1800	Ursule	French	Merchant brig	Captured	
11 January 1800	Vidette	French	Not recorded	Captured	
12 June 1800	Vengeur	French	16-gun privateer brig	Captured	
3 July 1800	Cultivator	British	Merchant brig	Recaptured	
14 July 1800	Favori	French	Not recorded	Captured	
15 July 1800	Phoenix	French	Not recorded	Captured	
22 October 1800	Vénus	French	32-gun frigate	Captured	
30 May 1801	Temeraire	French	Not recorded	Captured	
23 July 1801	Bien Aimé	French	Not recorded	Captured	
9 August 1804	William Heathcote	British	West Indiaman	Recaptured	
5 October 1804	Medéa	Spanish	42-gun frigate	Captured	
5 October 1804	Fama	Spanish	36-gun frigate	Captured	
5 October 1804	Clara	Spanish	36-gun frigate	Captured	
5 October 1804	Mercedes	Spanish	36-gun frigate	Destroyed	
16 July 1806	César	French	18-gun corvette	Captured	
19 October 1806	Achille	French	Chasse maree	Captured	
19 October 1806	Jenny	French	Chasse maree	Captured	
19 October 1806	Marianne	French	Chasse maree	Captured	
5 December 1807	Pamelia	French	Merchant ship	Captured	
26 December 1807	Eliza	American	Merchant ship	Captured	
7 January 1808	Fanny	French	Galiot	Captured	
31 July 1808	Diane	French	14-gun letter of marque	Captured	
19 August 1808	Adele	French	Not recorded	Captured	
1 September 1808	Sally	American	Merchant ship	Captured	
9 September 1808	Peggy	American	Merchant ship	Captured	
1 November 1808	Bonne Louise	French	Not recorded	Captured	
14 January 1809	Clarisse	French	3-gun privateer lugger	Captured	
20 February 1809	Matilda	French	Merchant schooner	Captured	
24 March 1809	Neptunus	Danish	Merchant brig	Captured	
28 March 1809	Nymphe	French	Merchant ship	Captured	
11 January 1810	Mouche № 26	French	1-gun dispatch boat	Captured	
6 May 1810	Camilla	French	Chasse maree	Captured	
6 May 1810	Bonne Rencontre	French	Chasse maree	Captured	
13 June 1810	Flora	British	Merchant ship	Recaptured	
20 October 1810	Intrigua	Portuguese	Merchant brig	Recaptured	
15 January 1811	Matilda	American	Merchant ship	Captured	
31 July 1812	Belleville	American	Merchant ship	Captured	
31 July 1812	Janus	American	Merchant ship	Captured	
31 July 1812	Aeos	American	Merchant ship	Captured	
31 July 1812	Ganges	American	Merchant ship	Captured	
31 July 1812	Leonidas	American	Merchant ship	Captured	
17 September 1812	Dankbarheide	Not recorded	Merchant ship	Captured	
29 September 1812	Friede	Prussian	Merchant ship	Captured	
