= French ship Droits de l'Homme (1794) =

Ship of the line of the French Navy

Coordinates: 47°57′37.19″N 4°25′42.42″W

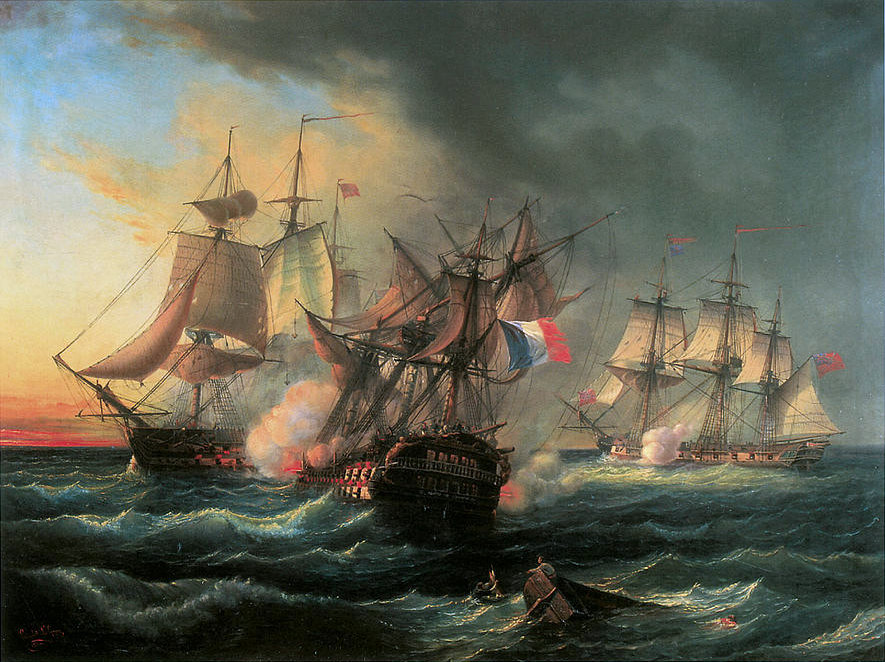
- Droits de l'Homme (centre) at the action of 13 January 1797

History

France
- Name: Droits de l'Homme
- Namesake: La Déclaration des droits de l'Homme et du citoyen
- Ordered: 16 February 1793
- Builder: Port-Liberté (now Lorient) Naval Dockyard
- Laid down: May 1793
- Launched: 29 May 1794
- Completed: July 1794
- Fate: Wrecked 14 January 1797

General characteristics
- Class & type: Téméraire-class ship of the line
- Displacement: 3,069 tonneaux
- Tons burthen: 1,537 port tonneaux
- Length: 55.87 metres (183.3 ft) (172 pied)
- Beam: 14.90 metres (48 ft 11 in) (45 pied 10 pouces)
- Draught: 7.26 metres (23.8 ft) (22 pied)
- Propulsion: Up to 2,485 m^{2} (26,750 sq ft) of sails
- Armament: 74 guns: Lower gundeck: 28 × 36-pounder long guns; Upper gundeck: 30 × 18-pounder long guns; Forecastle and Quarter deck: 16 × 8-pounder long guns; 4 × 36-pounder carronades
- Armour: Timber

Droits de l'Homme (French for 'Rights of Man'; [dʁwa də lɔm]) was a 74-gun Téméraire-class ship of the line of French Navy which served in the French Revolutionary Wars. Launched in 1794, the ship saw service in the Atlantic against the Royal Navy.

She was part of the fleet that sailed in December 1796 on the disastrous French expedition to Ireland. After unsuccessful attempts to land troops in Bantry Bay, Droits de l'Homme headed back to her home port of Brest, France. Two British frigates were waiting to intercept stragglers from the fleet, and engaged Droits de l'Homme in the action of 13 January 1797. Heavily damaged by the British ships and unable to manoeuvre in rough seas, the ship struck a sandbar and was wrecked. Hundreds of people died in the disaster.

== Construction and naming ==
The ship was built at Port-Liberté (now Lorient) and launched on 10 Prairial de l'An II (29 May 1794). Her name, awarded on 29 November 1793, refers to the 1789 Declaration of the Rights of Man and of the Citizen, one of the founding documents of the French Revolution.

== Service history ==
Droits de l'Homme, was involved in the action of 6 November 1794, chasing the British 74s Canada and Alexander. Droits de l'Homme caught up with Alexander first, but was forced out of action with damage to her rigging, but Alexander was soon caught by Jean Bart and Marat and captured, although she was to be recaptured by the British at the Battle of Groix on 22 June 1795.

Droits de l'Homme was lightly involved in Battle of Groix, on 22 June 1795, firing few if any shots during the battle.

=== Expédition d'Irlande ===
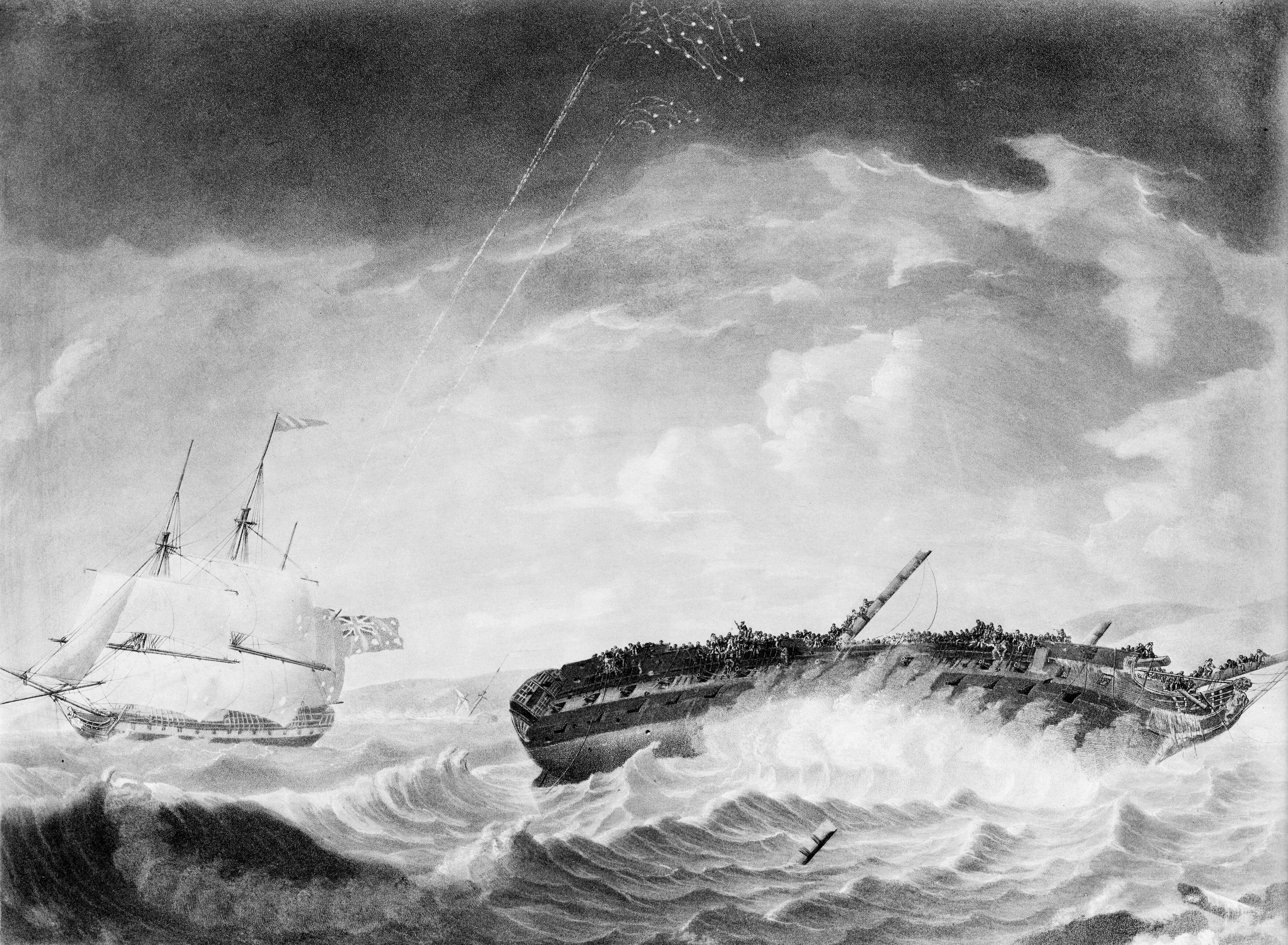
Engraving of HMS Indefatigable sailing past Droits de l'Homme (right) during the action of 13 January 1797

In December 1796 Droits de l'Homme, under Ship-of-the-line captain Raymond de Lacrosse, took part in the invasion attempt against Ireland, carrying 549 soldiers. On their way, the fleet was dispersed by tempests. Droits de l'Homme arrived at Bantry Bay and cruised off the coast, capturing the brigs Cumberland and Calypso. She stayed there for eight days to ascertain that no French ship was in distress on the coast, and departed for Brittany.

On 25 Nivôse An V in the action of 13 January 1797, off Penmarch, Droits de l'Homme met the British frigates HMS Indefatigable (44), under Sir Edward Pellew, and Amazon (36), commanded by Robert C. Reynolds. The sea was rough, preventing Droits de l'Homme from using her lower deck batteries and from boarding the British. Lacrosse was wounded; he gave command of the ship to his second officer, Prévost de Lacroix, and had his crew swear not to strike their colours.

After 13 hours of combat, running out of ammunition, the British broke contact when Indefatigable sighted land ahead. Indefatigable, despite having damage to her masts and rigging, managed to beat off the lee shore and escape Penmarch reefs; Amazon ran aground and was destroyed near Plozévet, and her crew captured. Droits de l'Homme, having lost her rudder, masts and anchors, ran aground off Plozévet.

Some of the crew were rescued by the ship's boats and fishing boats from nearby villages, but the rescue was interrupted for five days by the storm; 60 men died for lack of food and water. General Jean-Amable Humbert, who was commanding the soldiers aboard, narrowly escaped drowning, and between 250 and 390 men died in the wreck. Captain Lacrosse was last to leave the ship.

== Commemoration ==
In 1840, Major Pipon, a British officer who had been a prisoner aboard Droits de l'Homme, erected an inscribed menhir on the coast in remembrance of the tragedy. In 1876 it was broken into several pieces by the weather, but restored in 1882.
