= Lee shore =

Coast towards which the wind blows a vessel

A lee shore, sometimes also called a leeward (/ˈljuːərd/ shore, or more commonly /ˈliːwərd/), is a nautical term to describe a stretch of shoreline that is to the lee side of a vessel—meaning the wind is blowing towards land. Its opposite, the shore on the windward side of the vessel, is called the weather or windward shore (/ˈwɪnərd/ or, more commonly, /ˈwɪndwərd/).

Because of the danger of being driven aground on a lee shore it is essential seamanship to treat one with caution. This is particularly the case with sailing vessels, but a lee shore is an issue for powered vessels as well.

== Use of the terms "windward", "leeward", and "lee" ==
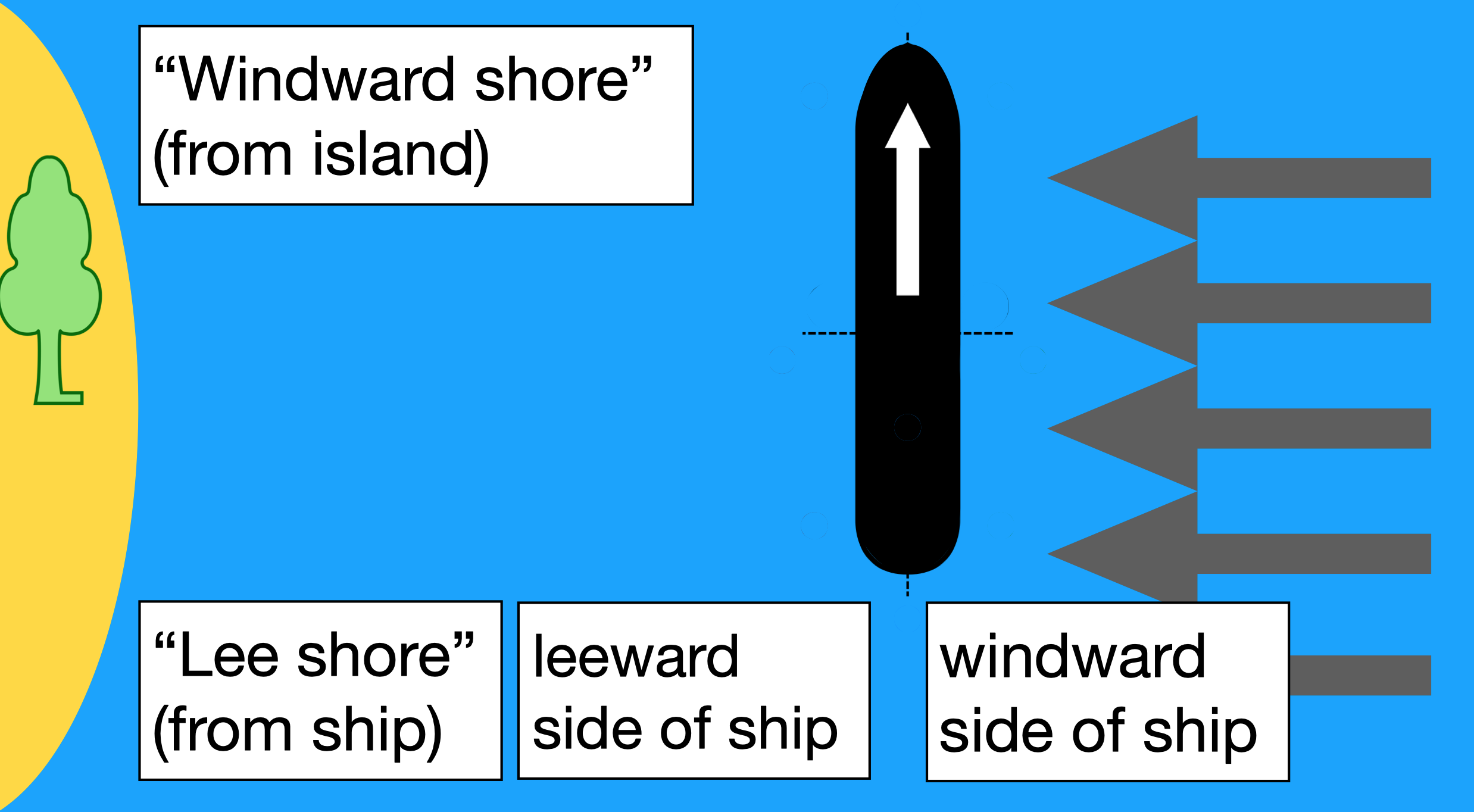
What is the windward shore to someone on land is termed the lee shore on a vessel, as it lies to its lee.

Usage of the terms to describe shores in relation to an arbitrary point of view, including on land, can lead to ambiguity. The windward shore of an island is a lee shore from the perspective of a vessel travelling offshore. Although the terms are often confused, "the lee shore" is different from "a leeward shore" based on the reference point from which the shore is viewed. Notice the different articles "the" and "a" — "the" windward or leeward shore versus "a" lee shore. The shore that is a lee shore changes based on the reference point, which is the vessel from which the island or lake shore is viewed, and of which the island or lake shore is in the lee. The leeward shore does not change based on the position of the vessel. This means that the "leeward side" of the vessel and the "lee shore" of the land face opposite directions.

== Leeward and windward shores ==
To someone on a vessel, the shore to lee of the vessel is the lee shore, and since that is the shore the wind reaches first, to someone on the shore it is the windward shore. "Lee" historically means "shelter". Standing on the leeward side of the vessel, a sailor observes being blown towards an exposed shoreline by the wind. Here again the reference point from which a shore is viewed determines whether it is the lee shore or a leeward shore. On a lake, the reference point is a body of water, so the windward shore is upwind of the center of the lake. On an island, the reference point is a landmass, so the windward shore is the shore upwind (most to windward) of the center of the island. On a vessel, however, the windward rail is the one the wind is hitting first, or the one most upwind. The same is true regarding an island: the side of the island most to windward is the windward shore.

=== Dangers of a lee shore and a windward shore ===
Lee shores are dangerous to watercraft because, if left to drift, they will be pushed into shore by the wind, possibly running aground. Sailboats are particularly susceptible to this, as even under sail they are limited to the angle they can travel into the wind; square rigged craft, for instance, can point only slightly to windward. It is possible for a sailing vessel to become trapped along a lee shore, with recourse being to use an engine, or use anchors to kedge out. Anchoring in a lee shore is not recommended. A lee shore line (e.g. beach, sand bar, rocks, reef) poses a significantly higher risk in a storm due to the undiminished effects of the wind and waves. Numerous shipwrecks are caused when vessels are driven into a lee shore. Because of this, it is always preferable to travel along a windward shore, especially in inclement weather. A windward shore will have significantly lower waves and slower winds, because they will have been slowed by passage over the land, but a windward shore does have its dangers, being subject to storm surge.

=== Dangers of a weather shore ===
Being the opposite of a lee shore, a weather shore is potentially treacherous for kitesurfers and windsurfers, who can be blown out to sea if the wind is blowing from the land. For them, a lee shore is safer. For ocean-going vessels during a storm, a lee shore is treacherous because the wind slowly forces the vessel toward the shore, where it will beach or break up. In shallow coastal water, maneuvering is impaired, waves may become steeper, and objects may be obscured. Navigating during a storm, either by chart or by dead reckoning, becomes extremely difficult. A storm surge may make the entrance to a protected body of water prohibitively treacherous or impossible to locate. Heavy weather tactics more often dictate heading out to sea, where deeper water and more room for maneuver allow a sailboat to heave to or adopt other defensive measures. In landsmen's parlance, this is called "riding out the storm."

== In literature ==
C.S. Forester highlighted the dangers of a lee shore in his famed series of novels about Horatio Hornblower. For example, Hornblower's first experience commanding a brig is described as follows: "...all his reading and all his instruction had warned him of the terrors of a lee shore."

Likewise, the fearsome dangers of a lee shore were frequently emphasized in the Aubrey–Maturin novels written by Patrick O'Brian, which have been acclaimed for nautical accuracy. Such expositions are often made to the nautically naive medical surgeon Stephen Maturin as a means of comic relief. There is no comedy, however, in one fictional encounter in Chapter Five of The Thirteen Gun Salute (ISBN 0-393-02974-3) with a lee shore in which HMS Diane comes within a few feet of being driven onto a sheer and merciless lee shore that would surely have caused the ship to go down.

In Herman Melville's Moby-Dick, "The Lee Shore" is the title of Chapter 23.

== In music ==
David Crosby wrote a song "The Lee Shore". This was recorded with Stephen Stills and Graham Nash at Stills' house, in Laurel Canyon, Los Angeles on December 28, 1969, but originally released in a live version on the album Four Way Street, on April 17, 1971.
