= IRIS Shahid Siyavashi =

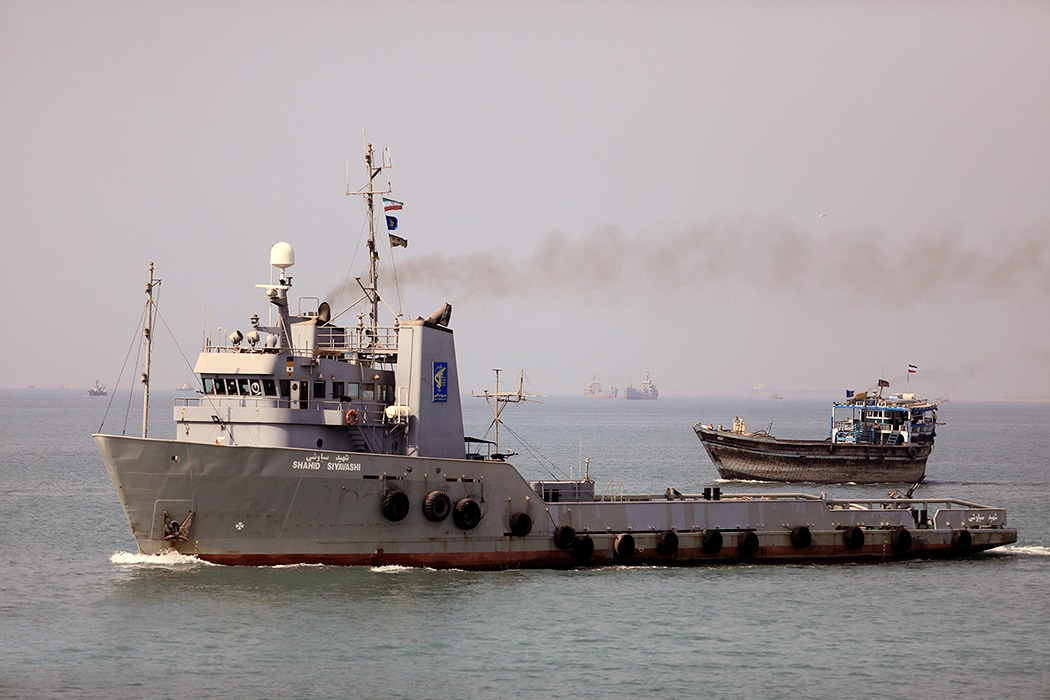

History

Iran
- Name: Shahid Siyavashi
- Namesake: Amir Siyavashi
- Operator: Navy of the Islamic Revolutionary Guard Corps
- Identification: Code letters: EQSI
- Status: In active service

General characteristics
- Type: Transport ship

Shahid Siyavashi (Persian: شهید سیاوشی) is a transport ship operated by the Navy of the Islamic Revolutionary Guard Corps of Iran.

== Construction ==
The ship was built in Iran.

== Operational history ==
According to a report by Fars News Agency, on 7 March 2020 Shahid Siyavashi was involved with USS Vella Gulf (CVE-111), forcing it to "move out of the way", while the latter was in the Mediterranean Sea at that time.

On 15 April 2020, the ship had an encounter with a U.S. Navy vessel. United States Central Command stated that the ship had been involved in "harassment" of their ships, while an IRGC official dismissed the account as a "Hollywood tale" and said "Americans blocked the path of our vessel against international regulations and refused to answer our radio calls but faced our forces' powerful reaction". This event resulted in United States President Donald Trump tweeting "I have instructed the United States Navy to shoot down and destroy any and all Iranian gunboats if they harass our ships at sea".

In June 2020, Iranian media published footage of a Sevom Khordad transporter-erector-launcher and radar (TELAR) unit aboard afterdeck of Shahid Siyavashi, launching a missile.
