= Beituo 739-class tug =

Chinese rescue tug class

History

PRC

General characteristics
- Type: Sea-going rescue tug (ATR)
- Displacement: 6,000 long tons (6,100 t)
- Length: 110 m (360 ft 11 in)
- Beam: 16 m (52 ft 6 in)
- Propulsion: Marine Diesel
- Electronic warfare & decoys: None
- Armament: Small arms
- Armour: None
- Aircraft carried: 1 helicopter
- Aviation facilities: Helipad

Bei-Tuo (北拖, meaning North Tug) 739-class tug is a class of little known sea-going rescue tug (ATR) built in the People’s Republic of China (PRC) for the People's Liberation Army Navy (PLAN).

Built by Huangpu Shipyard, Bei-Tuo 739-class tug is developed from three 14,000 kW civilian sea-going rescue tug built earlier by the same shipyard. Dispalced at more than six thousand tons, the tug is more than a hundred-ten meters long with sixteen meter beam. Rescue and towing equipment are located on afterdeck, and helipad is located on foredeck in front of the superstructure. Powered by a pair of 7200 kW engine with total output of 14400 kW total, Bei-Tuo 739 class tug is the fastest, largest and most powerful tug currently in service with PLAN (as of 2022).

Type	NATO designation	Pennant No.	Name (English)	Name (Han 汉)	Commissioned	Displacement	Fleet	Status
Bei-Tuo 739-class rescue tug (ATR)	?	Bei-Tuo 739	North Tug 739	北拖 739	2016	6000 t	North Sea Fleet	Active
Bei-Tuo 739-class rescue tug (ATR)	?	Bei-Tuo 743	North Tug 743	北拖 743	2018/2019	6000 t	North Sea Fleet	Active
Bei-Tuo 739-class rescue tug (ATR)	?	Dong-Tuo 861	East Tug 861	东拖 861	2018/2019	6000 t	East Sea Fleet	Active
Bei-Tuo 739-class rescue tug (ATR)	?	Dong-Tuo 863	East Tug 863	东拖 863	2019	6000 t	East Sea Fleet	Active
Bei-Tuo 739-class rescue tug (ATR)	?	Nan-Tuo 171	South Tug 171	南拖 171	2018/2019	6000 t	South Sea Fleet	Active
Bei-Tuo 739-class rescue tug (ATR)	?	Nan-Tuo 195	South Tug 195	南拖 195	January 2018	6000 t	South Sea Fleet	Active
