= Ice horn =

An Ice horn (regionally ice nose, ice cutter) is a triangular fitting at the waterline of the stern of a ship that protects its rudder and prop by breaking ice while traveling in reverse.

== Pictures ==
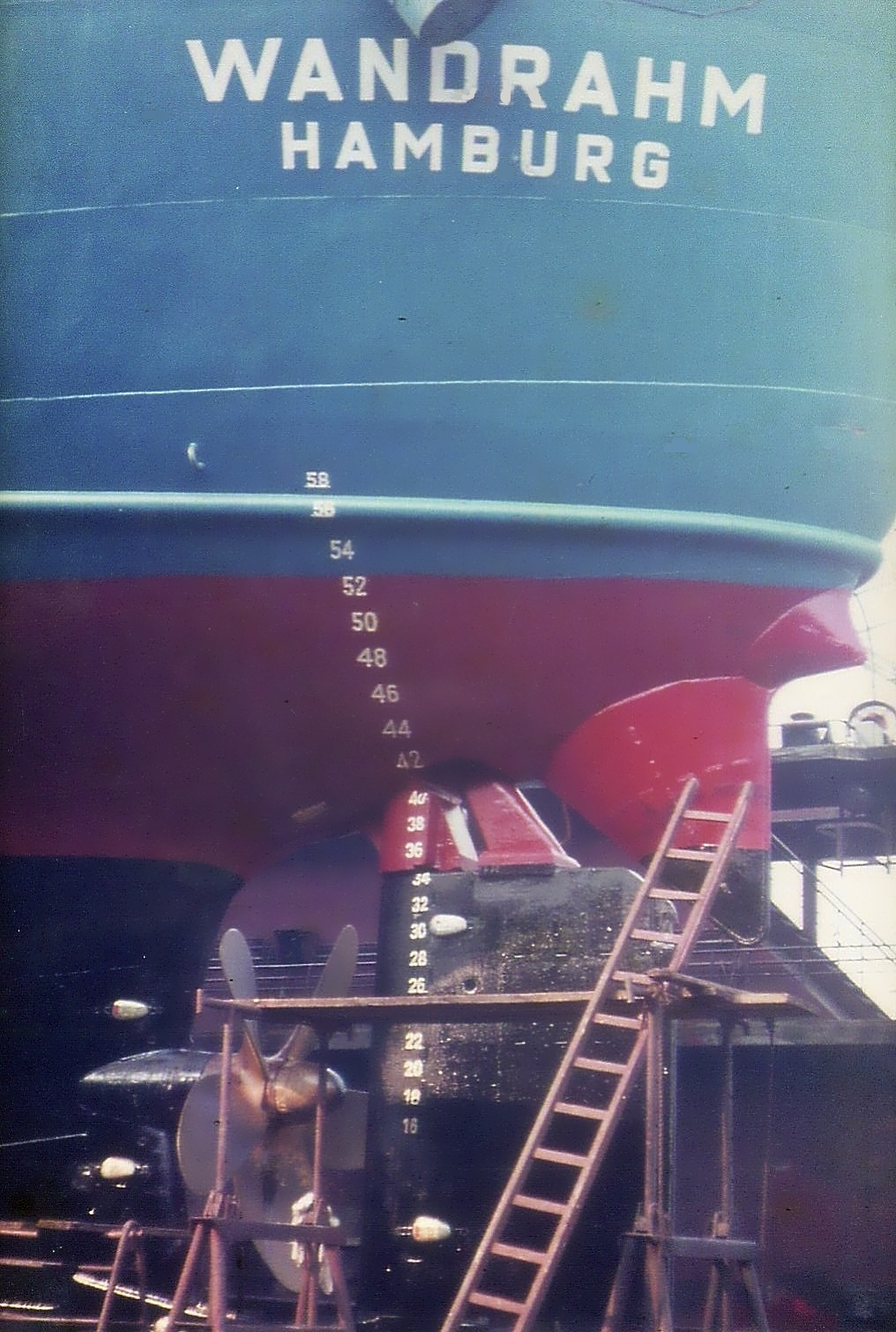
Ice horns of MV Wandrahm

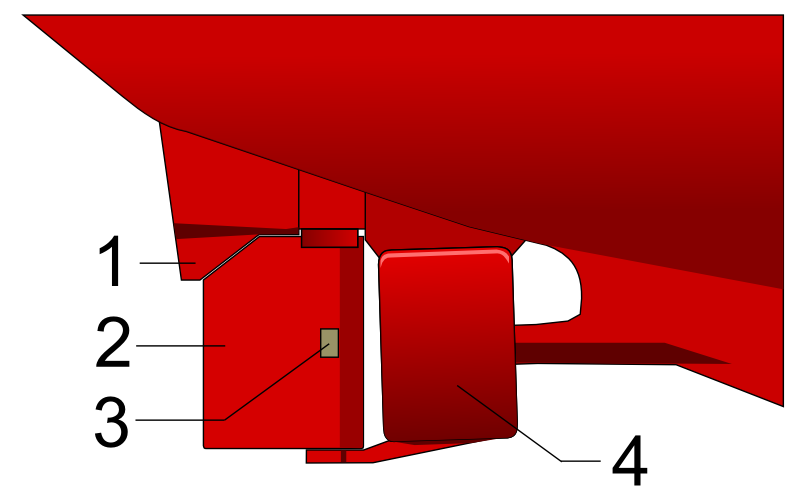
1. ice horn; 2. rudder; 3. galvanic anode; 4. ducted propeller

== Bibliography ==
- K. Schwitalla, Ulrich Scharnow: Lexikon der Seefahrt. 1988, transpress VEB Verlag für Verkehrswesen Berlin, ISBN 3-344-00190-6. page 131 (German)
