= Afterdeck =

Rear portion of a watercraft's deck

The afterdeck on this ship the deck from point 1 to 2. Main parts of ship. 1: Funnel; 2: Stern; 3: Propeller and Rudder; 4: Portside (the right side is known as starboard); 5: Anchor; 6: Bulbous bow; 7: Bow; 8: Deck; 9: Superstructure

In naval architecture, an afterdeck or after deck, or sometimes the aftdeck, aft deck or a-deck is the open deck area toward the stern or aft back part of a ship or boat. The afterdeck can be used for a number of different purposes, yet not all ships have an afterdeck. In place of the afterdeck, a ship may be built with a poop deck, that is a deck that forms the roof of a cabin built in the rear, or "aft", part of the superstructure of a ship; a poop deck is usually higher up than an afterdeck. A ship may have its superstructure or aftercastle located in the stern and thus not have an afterdeck. The stern and afterdeck of a ship are usually more smooth and stable than the bow (front) of the ship in motion. A taffrail is the handrail around the open afterdeck or poop deck. On wooden sailing ships like man-of-war or East Indiaman the taffrail is usually a hand carved wood rail and often highly decorated.

== Afterdeck uses ==
- Navy war ships may use the afterdeck to mount deck guns.
- Missile boats may have missiles launching on the afterdeck.
- Minelaying gear on Navy ship's afterdeck.
- Minesweeper gear on Navy ship's afterdeck.
- Depth charge launching on Navy ship's afterdeck.
- Torpedo tube for torpedo launching on Navy ship's afterdeck.
- Some Navy and private ships use the afterdeck as a helicopter deck for a heliport for helicopters.
- A sundeck for chairs, chaise longue and lounge chairs.
- Rear deck swimming pool with a sundeck.
- On fishing boats a place to lay fishing nets or big-game fishing chairs or trawler gear.
- Cable laying gear.
- Scuba diving deck.
- Amphibious vehicle launching
- Submersible launching
- Water skiing launching
- Samson post, a strong pillar-post for a towing cable or other support.
- Lifting crane or gantry crane.
- Ferry ramp for vehicles.
- Ancient Greece ships sometimes had shrines or altars on the afterdeck.

== Gallery ==
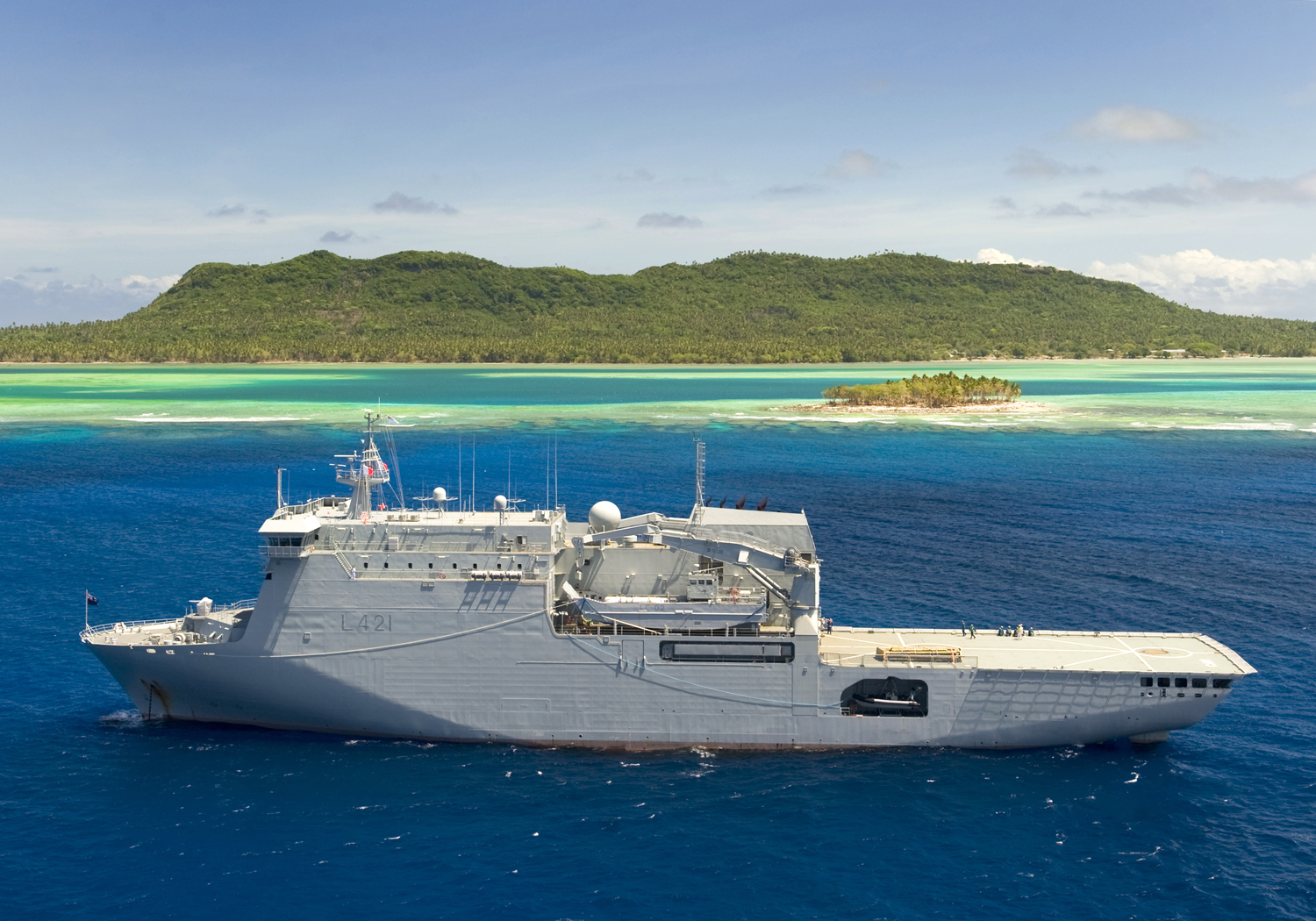
HMNZS Canterbury with a large aftdeck for helicopters.

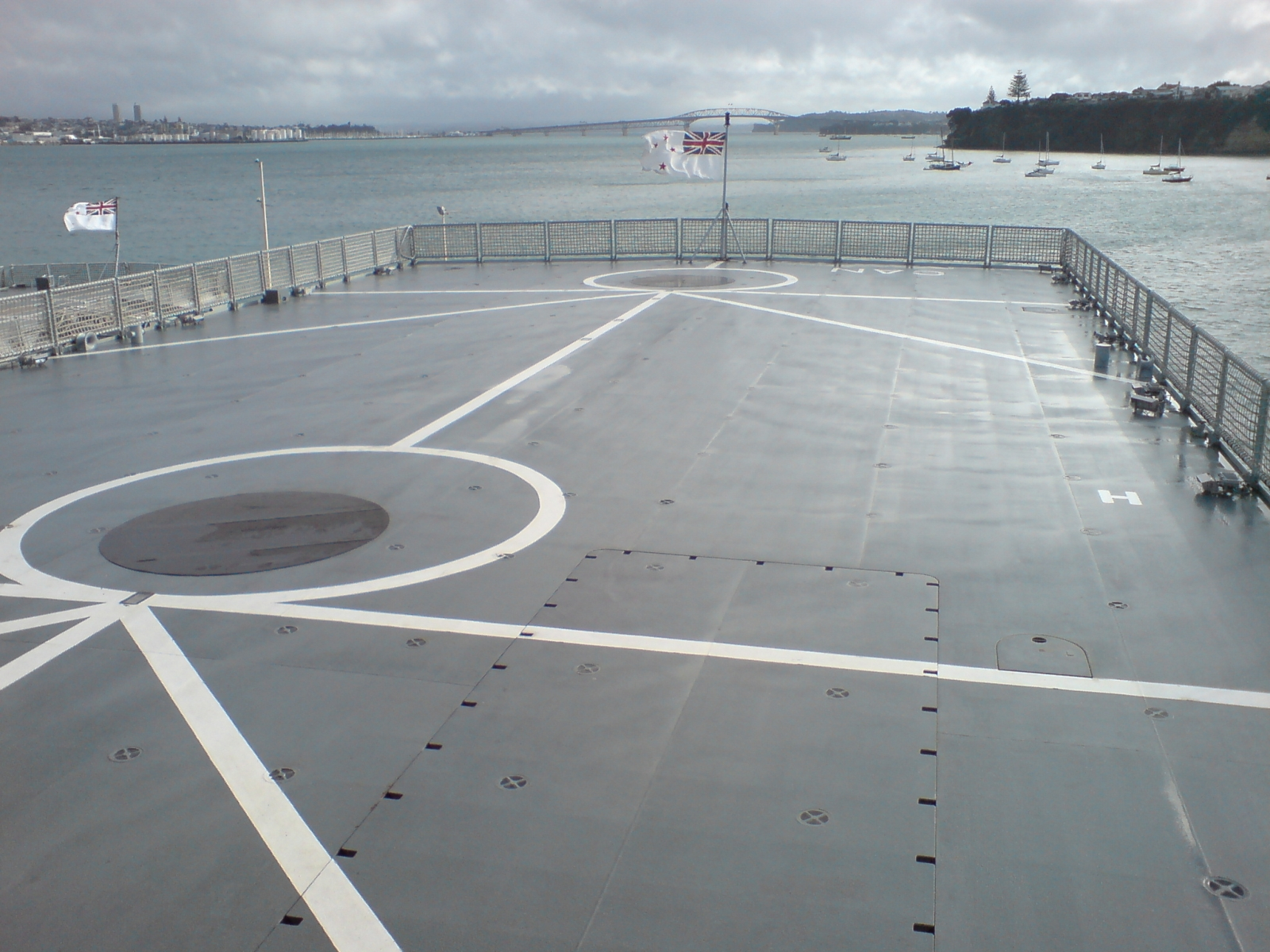
HMNZS Canterbury's helicopter afterdeck.

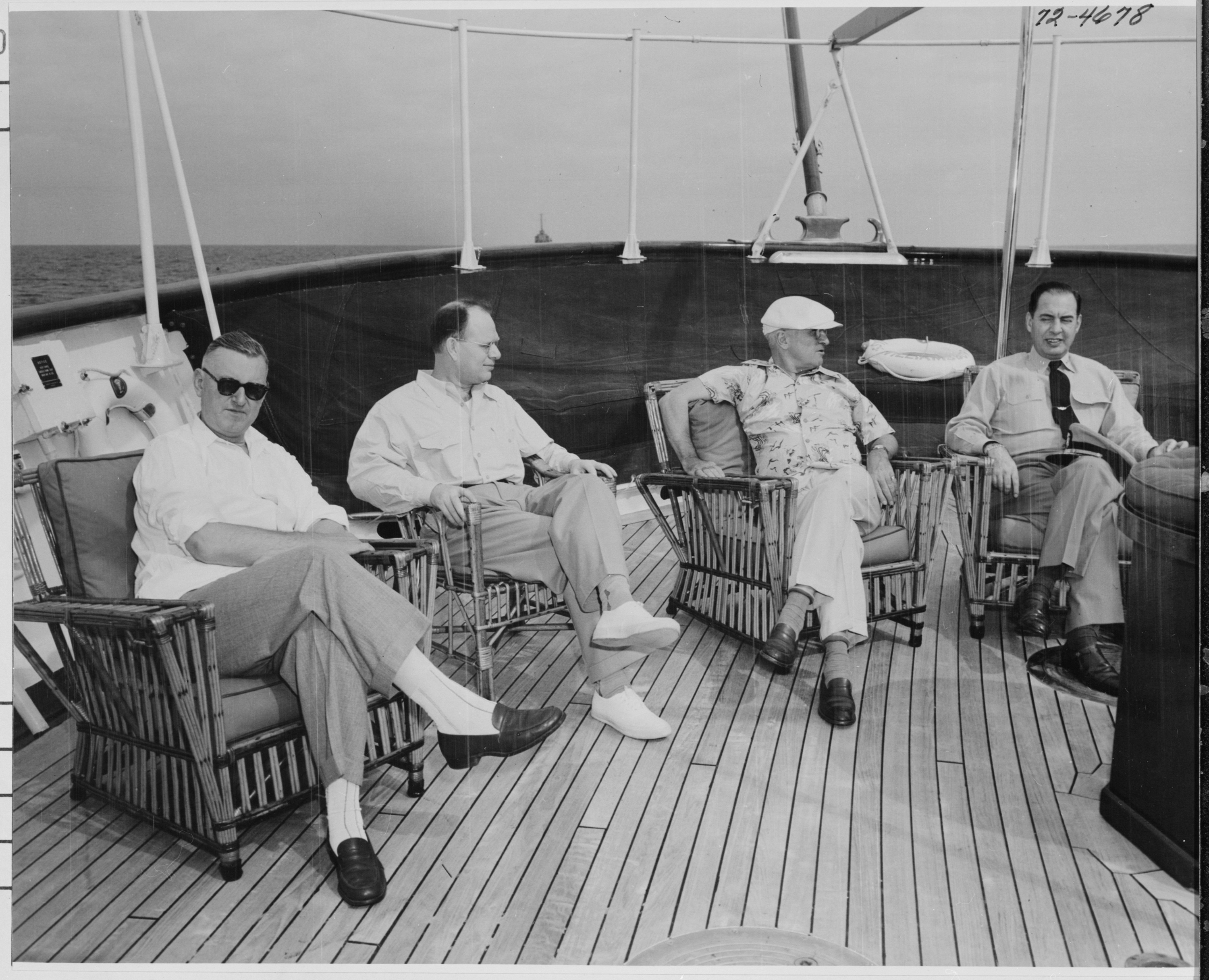
President Truman and members of his staff relaxing on the afterdeck of the yacht USS Williamsburg.

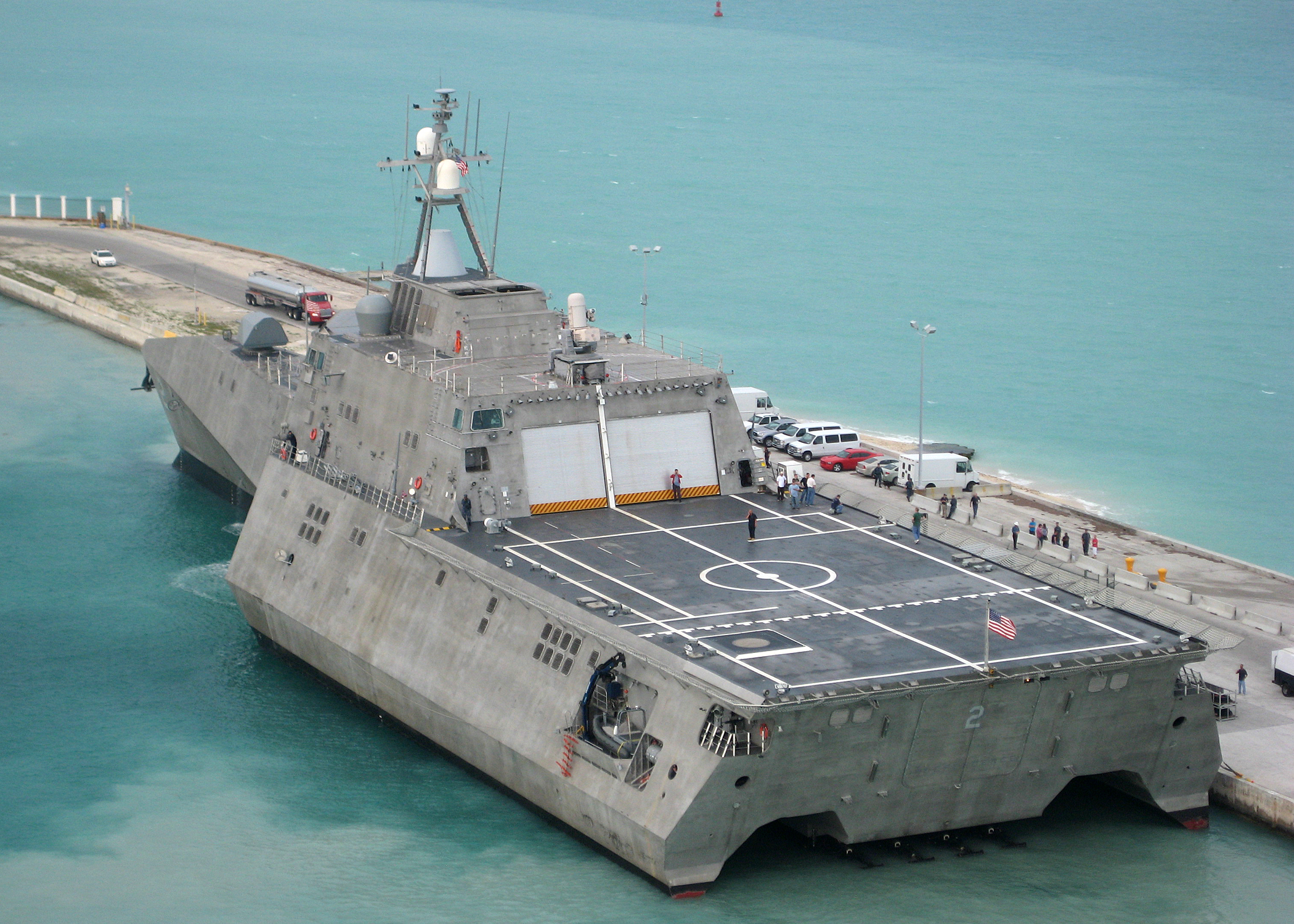
After deck of USS Independence.

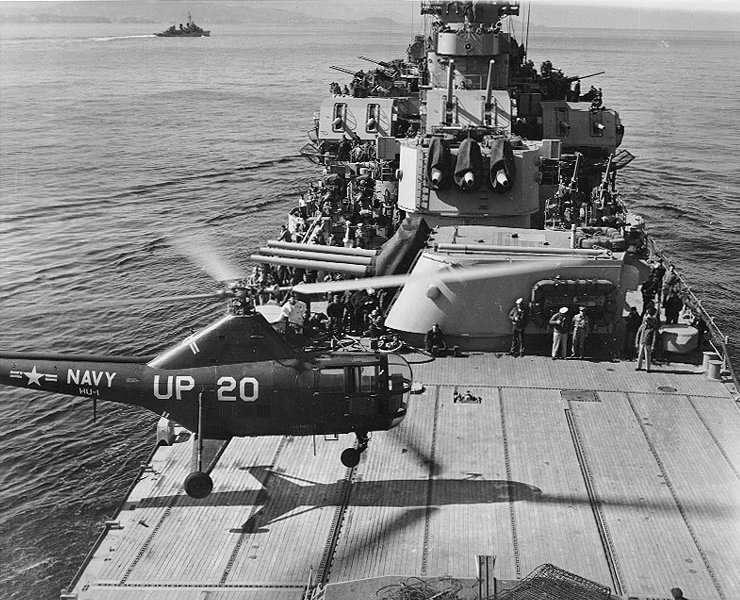
HO3S landing on after deck of USS Manchester.

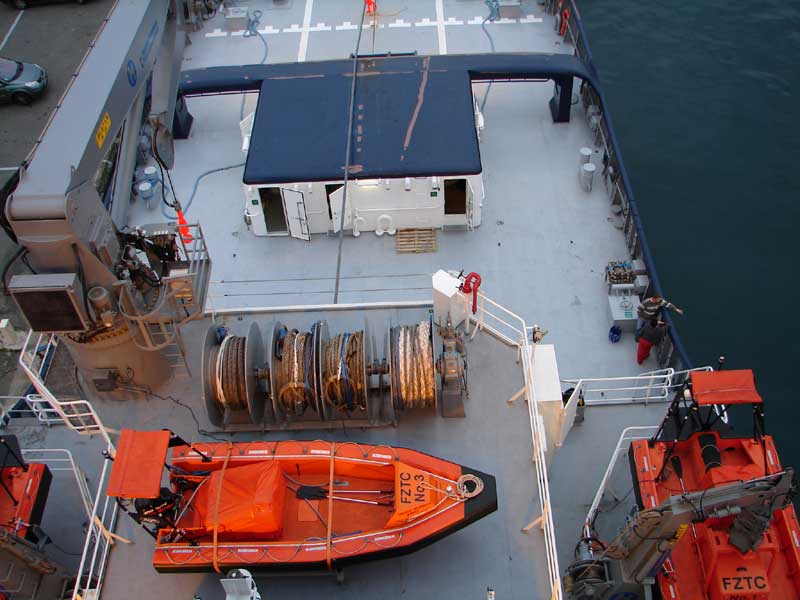
After deck of Abeille Bourbon.

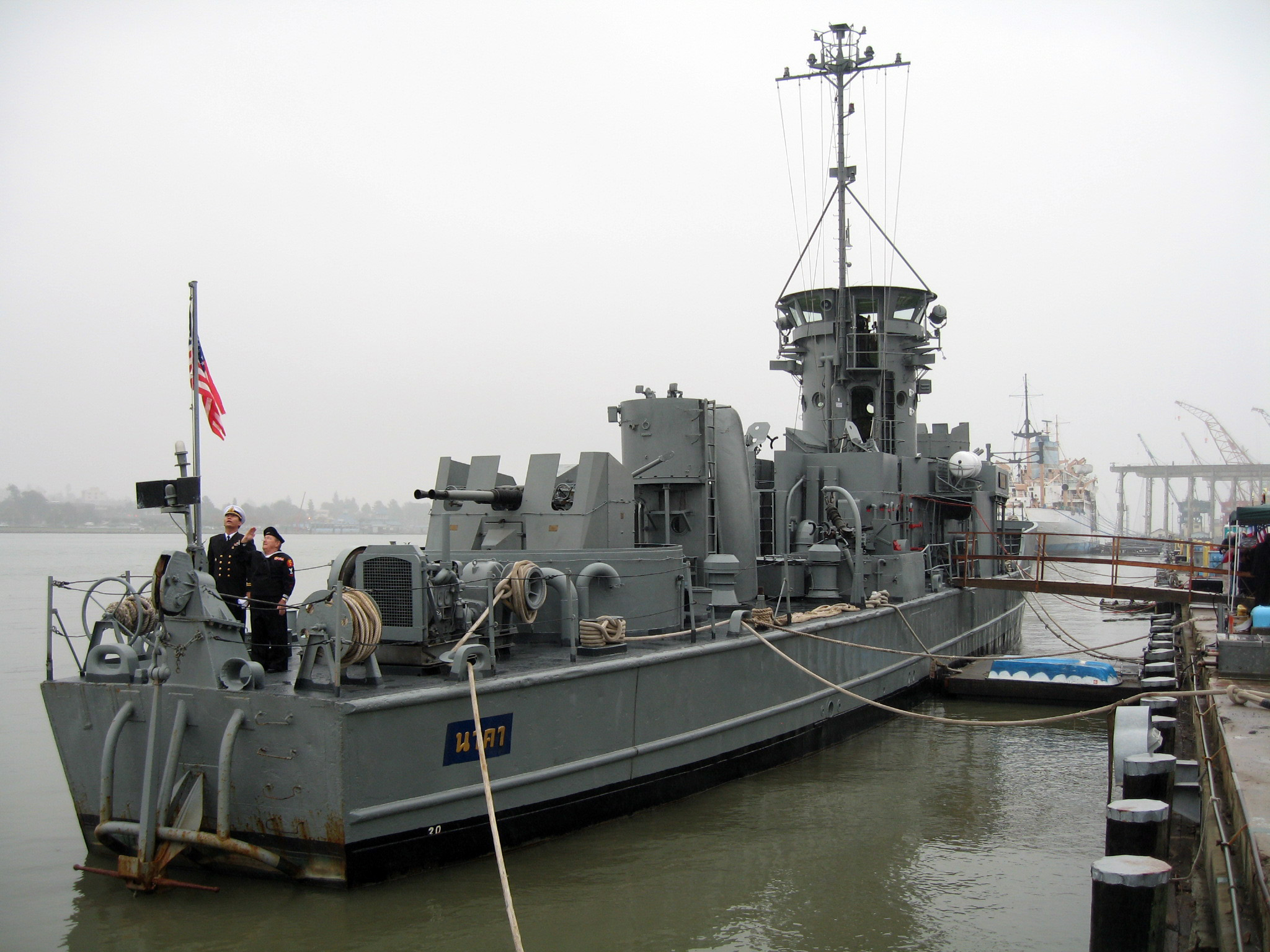
Sailors on the afterdeck of HTMS Nakha.

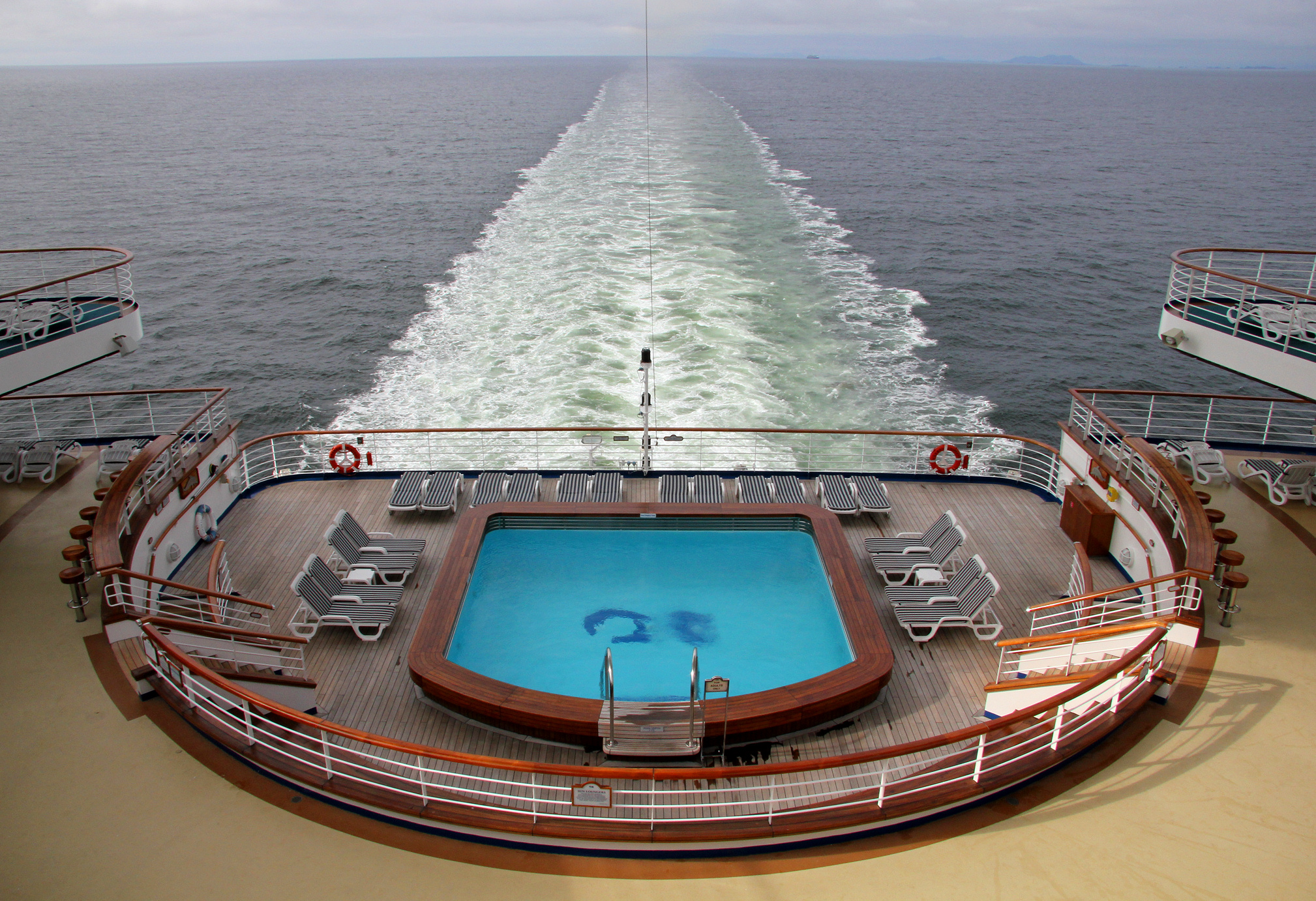
Aftdeck pool on Golden Princess.

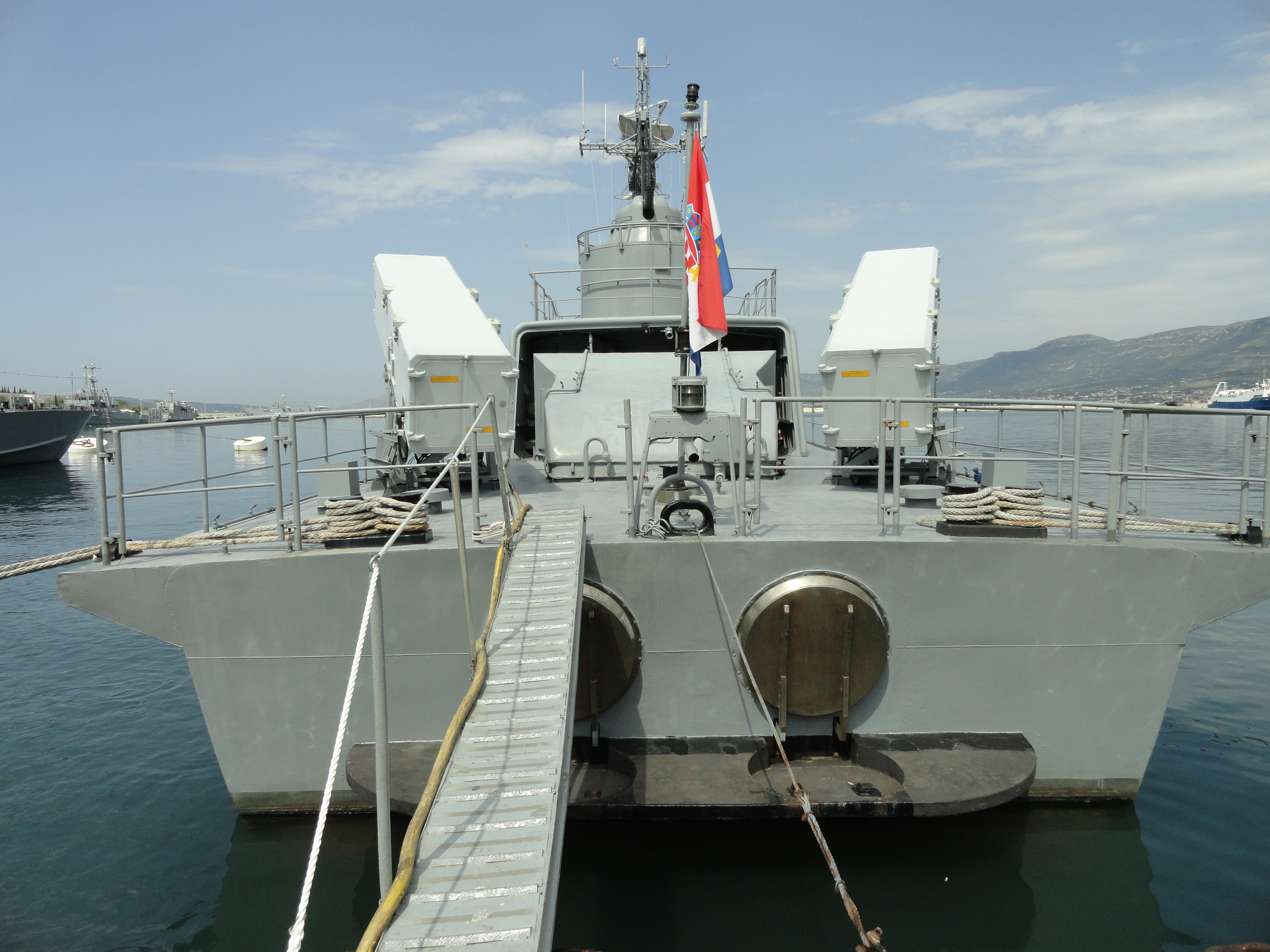
Missile launchers on the after deck of Šibenik

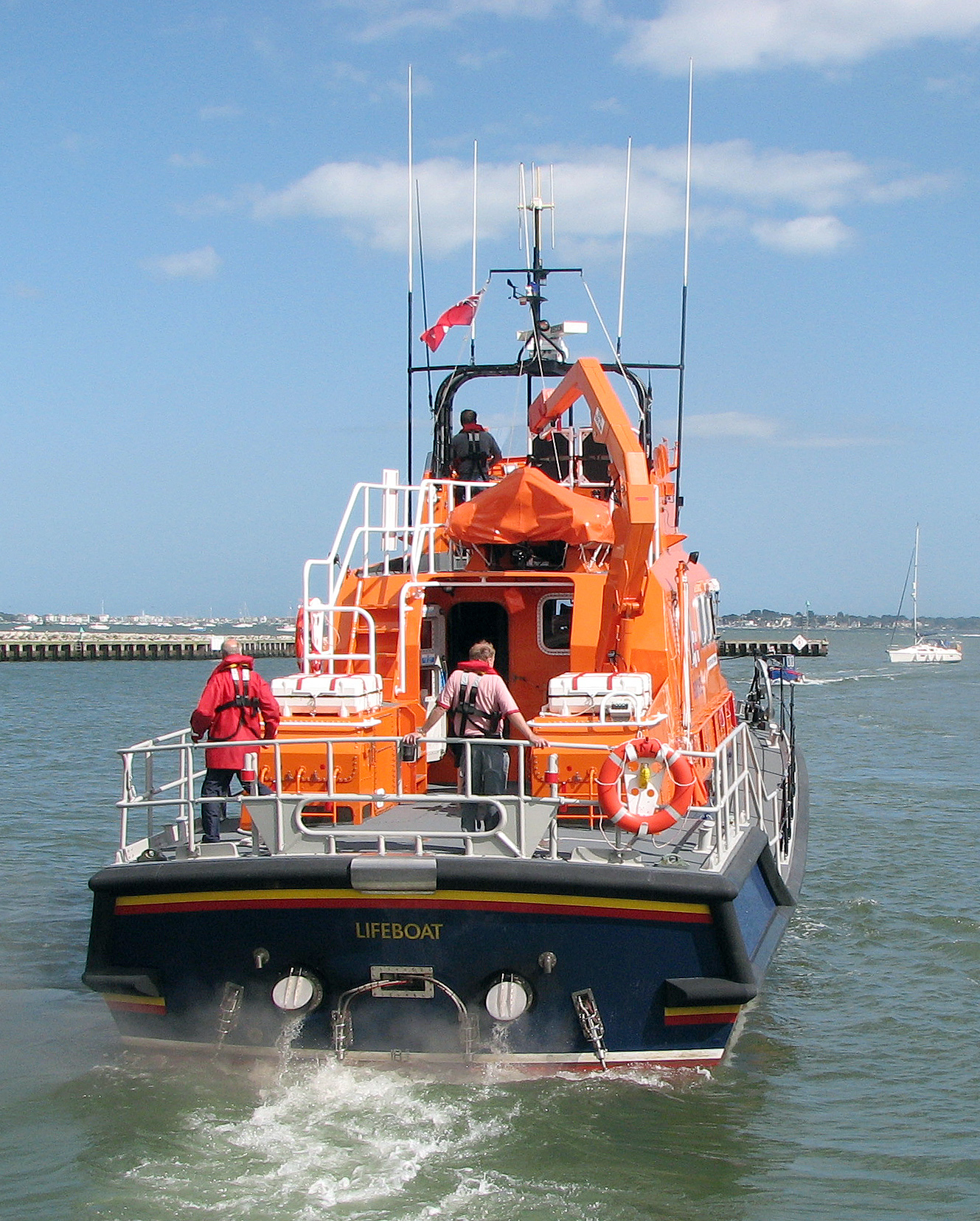
After deck of a UK Rescue Lifeboat 17-31.

== See also ==
- Common names for decks
- Main deck
