= Stern =

Back or aft-most part of a ship or boat

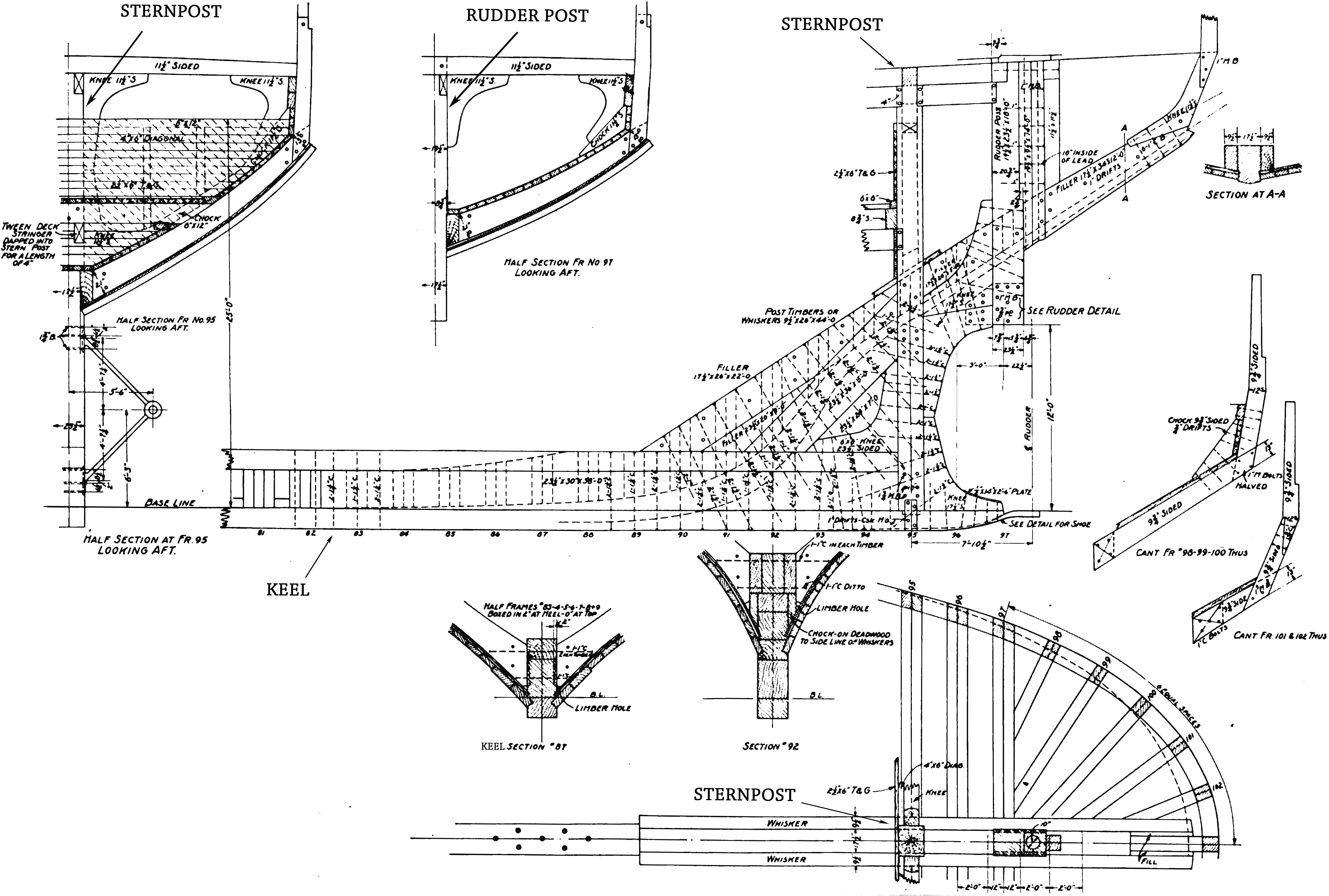
Detailed schematic of an elliptical or "fantail" stern

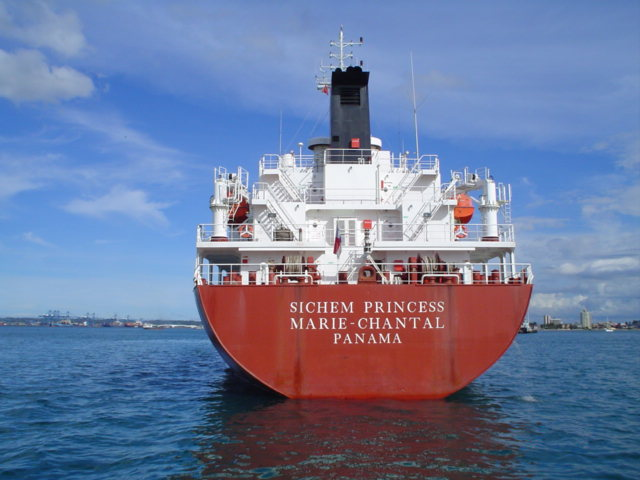
The flat transom stern of the cargo ship Sichem Princess Marie-Chantal

The stern is the back or aft-most part of a ship or boat, technically defined as the area built up over the sternpost, extending upwards from the counter rail to the taffrail. The stern lies opposite the bow, the foremost part of a ship. Originally, the term only referred to the aft port section of the ship, but eventually came to refer to the entire back of a vessel. The stern end of a ship is indicated with a white navigation light at night.

Sterns on European and American wooden sailing ships began with two principal forms: the square or transom stern and the elliptical, fantail, or merchant stern, and were developed in that order. The hull sections of a sailing ship located before the stern were composed of a series of U-shaped rib-like frames set in a sloped or "cant" arrangement, with the last frame before the stern being called the fashion timber(s) or fashion piece(s), so called for "fashioning" the after part of the ship. This frame is designed to support the various beams that make up the stern.

In 1817 the British naval architect Sir Robert Seppings introduced the concept of a rounded stern. The square stern had been an easy target for enemy cannon, and could not support the weight of heavy stern chase guns. But Seppings' design left the rudder head exposed, and was regarded by many as simply ugly—no American warships were designed with such sterns, and the round stern was quickly superseded by the elliptical stern. The United States began building the first elliptical stern warship in 1820, a decade before the British. USS Brandywine became the first sailing ship to sport such a stern. Though a great improvement over the transom stern in terms of its vulnerability to attack when under fire, elliptical sterns still had obvious weaknesses which the next major stern development—the iron-hulled cruiser stern—addressed far better and with significantly different materials.

== Types ==
=== Transom ===
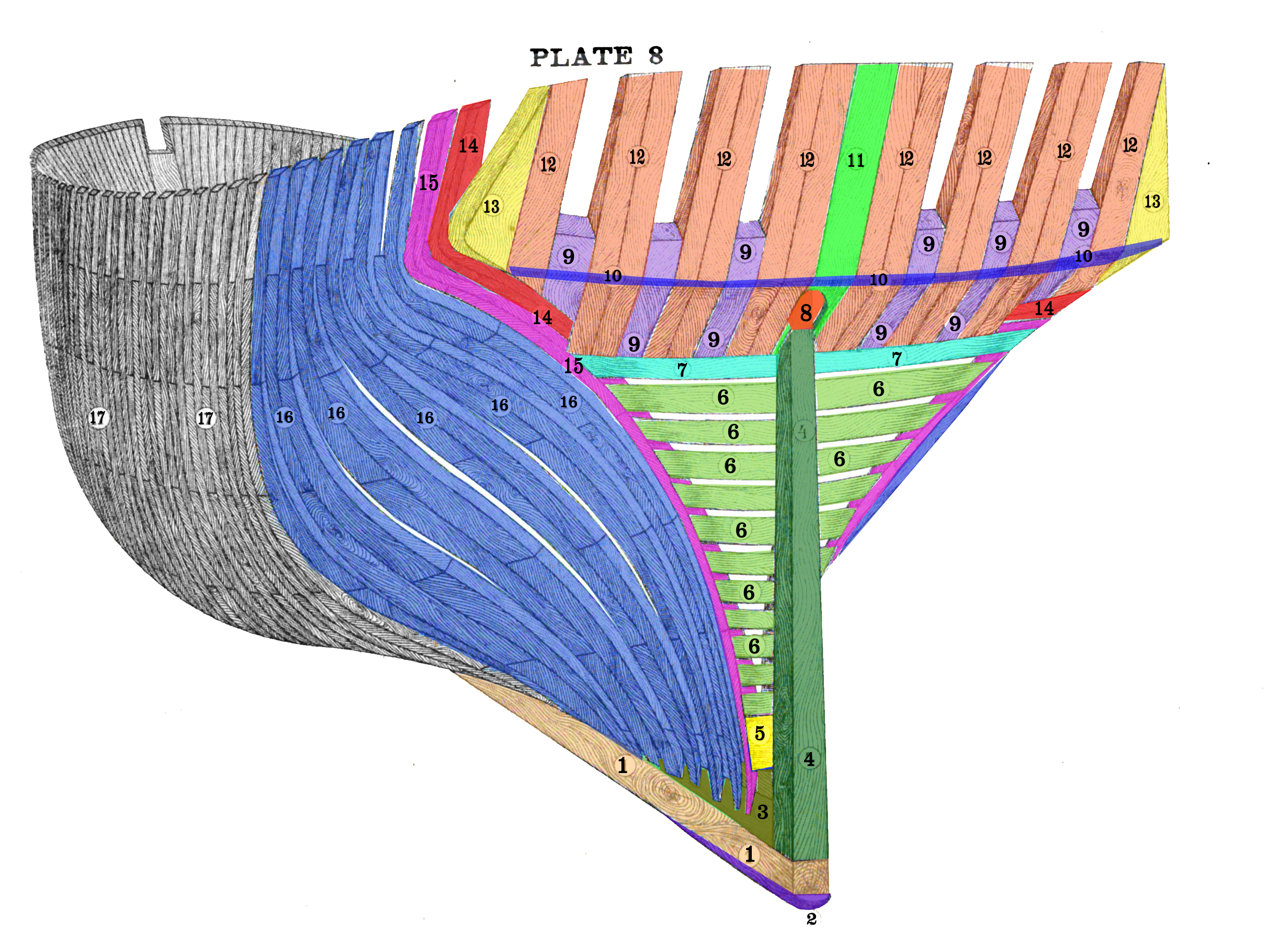
1. Keel (light peach) 2. Skeg (dark purple) 3. Deadwood (olive drab) 4. Stern post (forest green) 5. Filling chock (bright yellow) 6. Filling transoms (pale yellow-green) 7. Wing transom (turquoise) 8. Helm port (orange) 9. Counter timbers (pale violet) 10. Margin (indigo) 11. Horn timber (green) 12. Stern timbers (apricot) 13. Side-counter timbers (pale yellow) 14. Quarter-timbers (red) 15. Fashion timber (fuchsia) 16. Cant frames (blue) 17. Square body frames (uncolored)

In naval architecture, the term transom has two meanings. First, it can be any of the individual beams that run side-to-side or "athwart" the hull at any point abaft the fashion timber; second, it can refer specifically to the flat or slightly curved surface that is the very back panel of a transom stern. In this sense, a transom stern is the product of the use of a series of transoms, and hence the two terms have blended.

The stern of a traditional sailing ship housed the captain's quarters and became increasingly large and elaborate between the 15th and 18th centuries, especially in the baroque era, when wedding-cake-like structures became so heavy that crews sometimes threw the decoration overboard rather than be burdened with its useless weight. Until a new form of stern appeared in the 19th century, the transom stern was a floating house—and required just as many timbers, walls, windows, and frames. The stern frame provided the foundational structure of the transom stern, and was composed of the sternpost, wing transom, and fashion piece.

Abaft the fashion timber, the transom stern was composed of two different kinds of timbers:

- Transoms – These timbers extend across the low parts of the hull near the rudder, and are secured (notched and/or bolted) to the sternpost. The transom located at the base of the stern, and the uppermost of the main transoms, was typically called the wing transom; the principal transom below this and level with the lower deck was called the deck transom; between these two were a series of filling transoms. If the stern had transoms above the wing transom, they would no longer be affixed to the sternpost. The first of these might be called a counter transom; next up was the window sill transom; above that, the spar deck transom. The larger the vessel, the more numerous and wider the transoms required to support its stern.
- Stern timbers (also called stern frames) – These timbers are mounted vertically in a series; each timber typically rests or "steps" on the wing transom and then stretches out (aft) and upward. Those not reaching all the way to the taffrail are called short stern timbers, while those that do are called long stern timbers. The two outermost of these timbers, located at the corners of the stern, are called the side-counter timbers or outer stern timbers. It is the stern timbers collectively which determine the backward slope of the square stern, called its rake – that is, if the stern timbers end up producing a final transom that falls vertically to the water, this is considered a transom with no rake; if the stern timbers produce a stern with some degree of slope; such a stern is considered a raked stern.

The flat surface of any transom stern may begin either at or above the waterline of the vessel. The geometric line which stretches from the wing transom to the archboard is called the counter; a large vessel may have two such counters, called a lower counter and a second or upper counter. The lower counter stretches from directly above the wing transom to the lower counter rail, and the upper counter from the lower counter rail to the upper counter rail, immediately under the stern's lowest set of windows (which in naval parlance were called "lights").

=== Elliptical ===
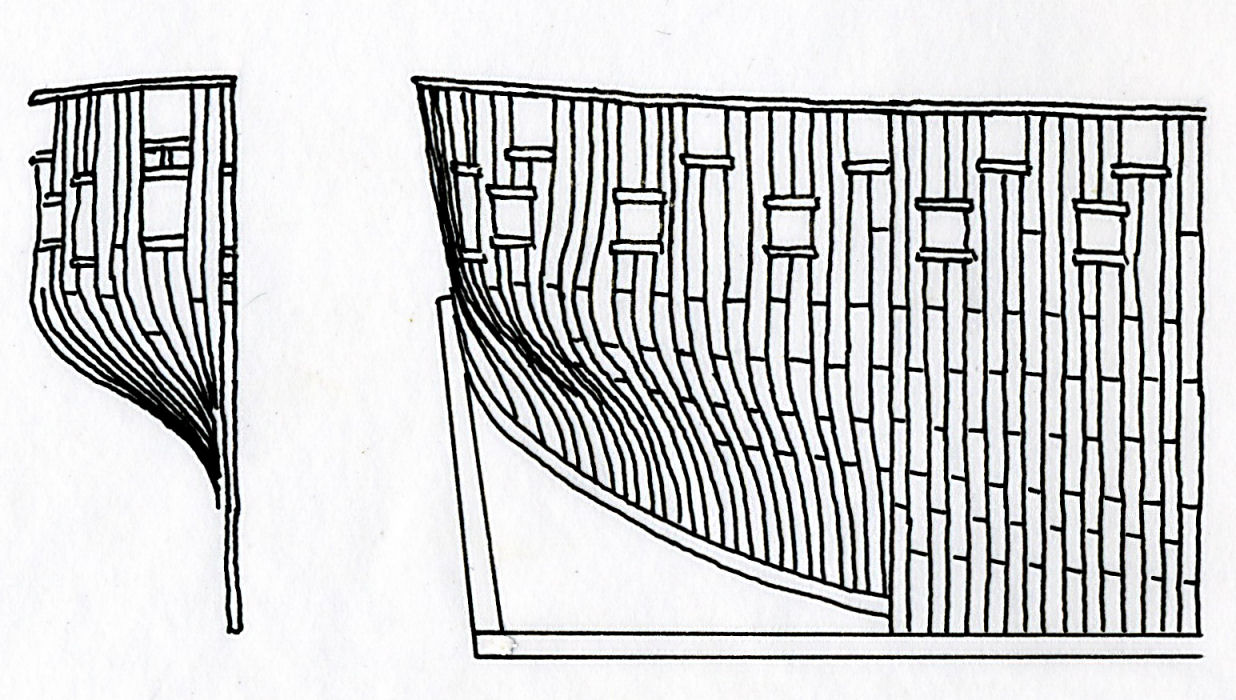
Diagram of a rounded stern as designed by Sir Robert Seppings

The visual unpopularity of Seppings's rounded stern was soon rectified by Sir William Symonds. In this revised stern, a set of straight post timbers (also called "whiskers", "horn timbers", or "fan tail timbers") stretches from the keel diagonally aft and upward. It rests on the top of the sternpost and runs on either side of the rudder post (thus creating the "helm port" through which the rudder passes) to a point well above the vessel's waterline. Whereas the timbers of the transom stern all heeled on the wing transom, the timbers of the elliptical stern all heel on the whiskers, to which they are affixed at a 45° angle (i.e., "canted") when viewed from overhead and decrease in length as they are installed aft until the curvature is complete. The finished stern has a continuous curved edge around the outside and is raked aft.

The counter stern of SS Constitution was shared with her sister ship, SS Independence

Other names for the elliptical stern include a "counter stern", in reference to its very long counter, and a "cutaway stern". The elliptical stern began use during the Age of Sail, but remained very popular for both merchant and warships well into the nautical Age of Steam and through the first eight decades of steamship construction (roughly 1840–1920). Despite the design's leaving the rudder exposed and vulnerable in combat situations, many counter-sterned warships survived both World Wars, and stylish high-end vessels sporting them were coming off the ways into the 1950s, including the US-flagged sisters SS Constitution and SS Independence.

=== Cruiser ===
As ships of wooden construction gave way to iron and steel, the cruiser stern—another design without transoms and known variously as the canoe stern, parabolic stern, and the double-ended stern—became the next prominent development in ship stern design, particularly in warships of the earlier half of the 20th century. The intent of this re-design was to protect the steering gear by bringing it below the armor deck. The stern now came to a point rather than a flat panel or a gentle curve, and the counter reached from the sternpost all the way to the taffrail in a continuous arch. It was soon discovered that vessels with cruiser sterns experienced less water resistance when under way than those with elliptical sterns, and between World War I and World War II most merchant ship designs soon followed suit.

=== Others ===
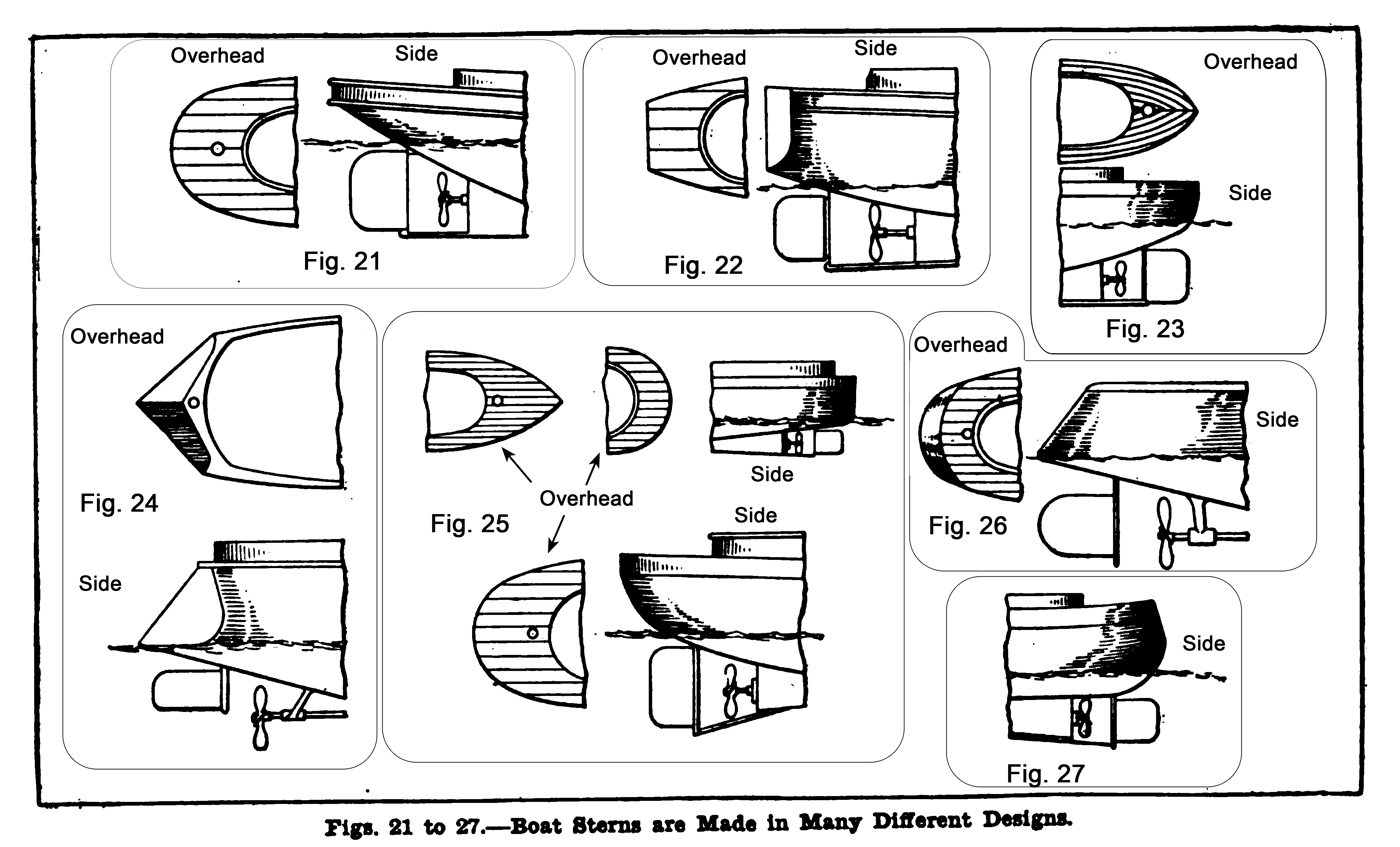
Illustrations of several kinds of stern: Fig. 21 Fantail; Fig. 22 Transom; Fig. 23 "Compromise"; Fig. 24 "V" stern; Fig. 25 Round; Fig. 26 Torpedo; Fig. 27 Canoe

None of these three main types of stern has vanished from the modern naval architectural repertoire, and all three continue to be used in one form or another by designers for many uses. Variations on these basic designs have resulted in an outflow of "new" stern types and names, only some of which are itemized here.

The reverse stern, reverse transom stern, sugar-scoop, or retroussé stern is a kind of transom stern that is raked backwards (common on modern yachts, rare on vessels before the 20th century); the vertical transom stern or plumb stern is raked neither forward nor back, but falls directly from the taffrail down to the wing transom. The rocket ship stern is a term for an extremely angled retroussé stern. A double ended ship with a very narrow square counter formed from the bulwarks or upper deck above the head of the rudder is said to have a pink stern or pinky stern. The torpedo stern or torpedo-boat stern describes a kind of stern with a low rounded shape that is nearly flat at the waterline, but which then slopes upward in a conical fashion towards the deck (practical for small high-speed power boats with very shallow drafts).

A Costanzi stern is a type of stern designed for use on ocean-going vessels. Its hard-chined design is a compromise between the 'spoon-shaped' stern usually found on ocean liners, and the flat transom, often required for fitting azimuth thrusters. The design allows for improved seagoing characteristics. It is the stern design on Queen Mary 2, and was originally proposed for SS Oceanic and Eugenio C, both constructed in the 1960s.

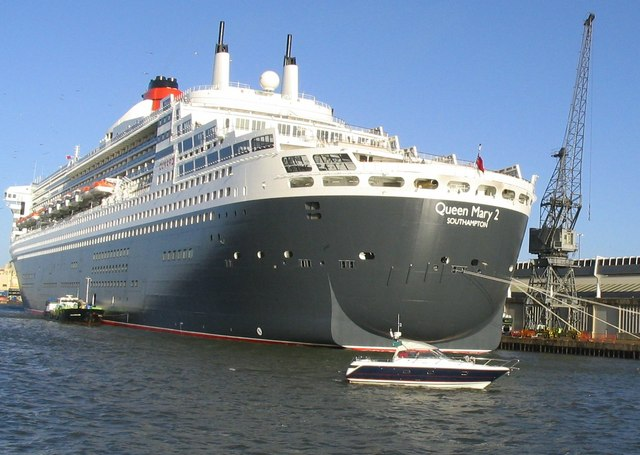
The hard-chines of a Costanzi stern on Queen Mary 2

A lute stern is to be found on inshore craft on the Sussex, England, shore. It comprises a watertight transom with the topside planking extended aft to form a non-watertight counter which is boarded across the fashion timbers curving outward aft from the transom. Some working boats and modern replicas have a similar form of counter, built to be water tight as described in the "transom stern" section above. These are being confused with lute sterns but as a lute is not watertight, a better term is needed. Chappelle in American Small Sailing Craft refers to a Bermudan boat with this form of counter, using the term "square tuck stern" to describe it. The term "tuck" is used in the northwest of England for this area of the hull at the sternpost, and for the bulkhead across the counter if one is fitted.

The fantail stern widens from the waterline as it goes upwards. It was found on many 19th century tea clippers and the ill-fated RMS Titanic.

A bustle stern refers to any kind of stern (transom, elliptical, etc.) that has a large "bustle" or blister at the waterline below the stern to prevent the stern from "squatting" when getting underway. It only appears in sailboats, never in power-driven craft.

An ice horn is a triangular stern component that protects a ship's rudder and prop while traveling in reverse.

== Image gallery ==
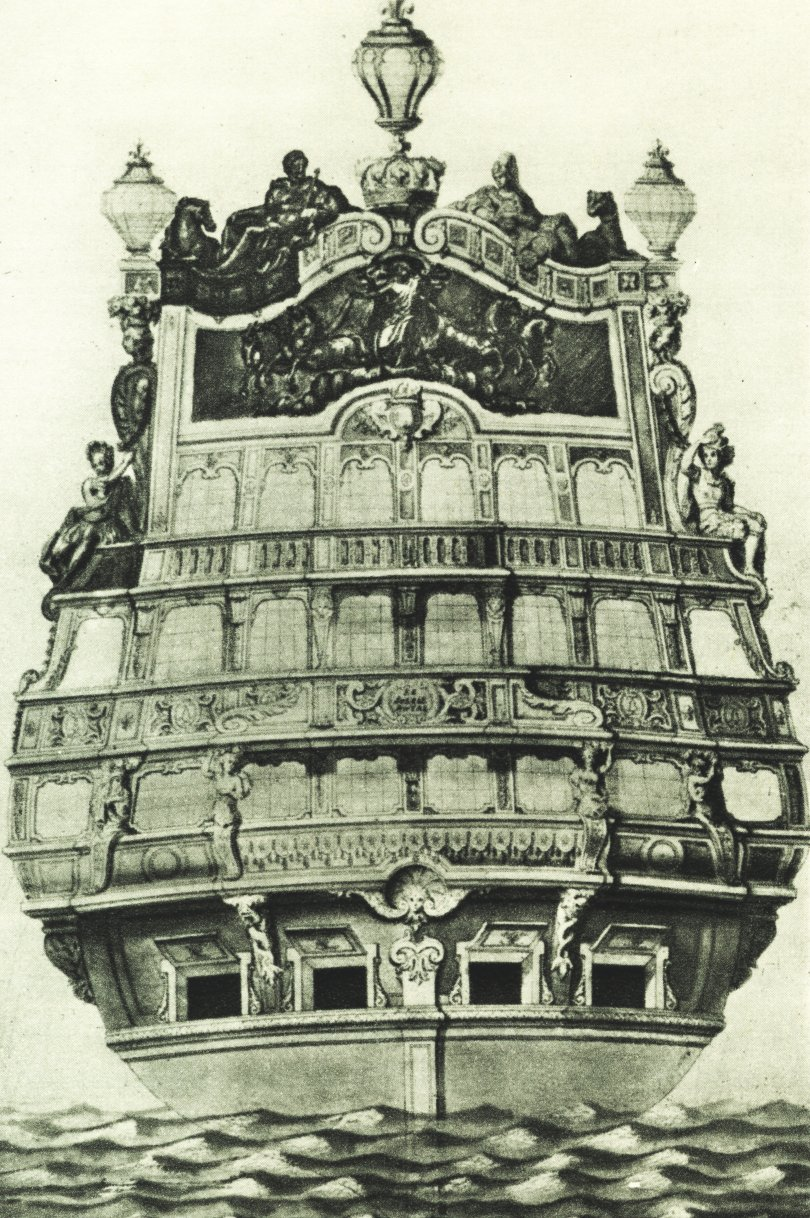
The elaborate transom of the 17th century 104-gun ship of the line Soleil Royal, by Jean Bérain the Elder

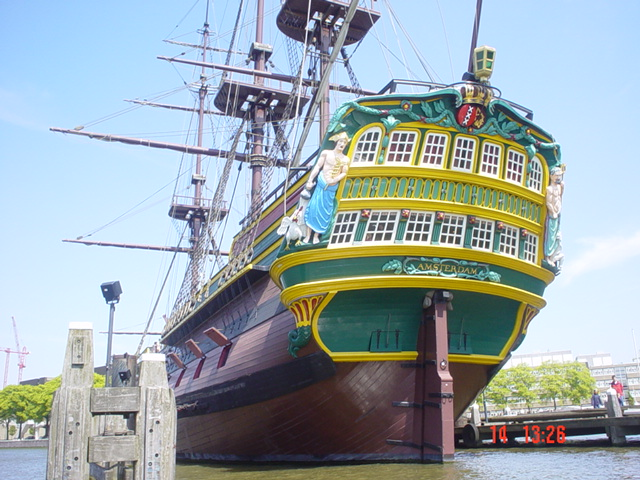
The transom stern of the 18th century Dutch East India Company cargo ship Amsterdam

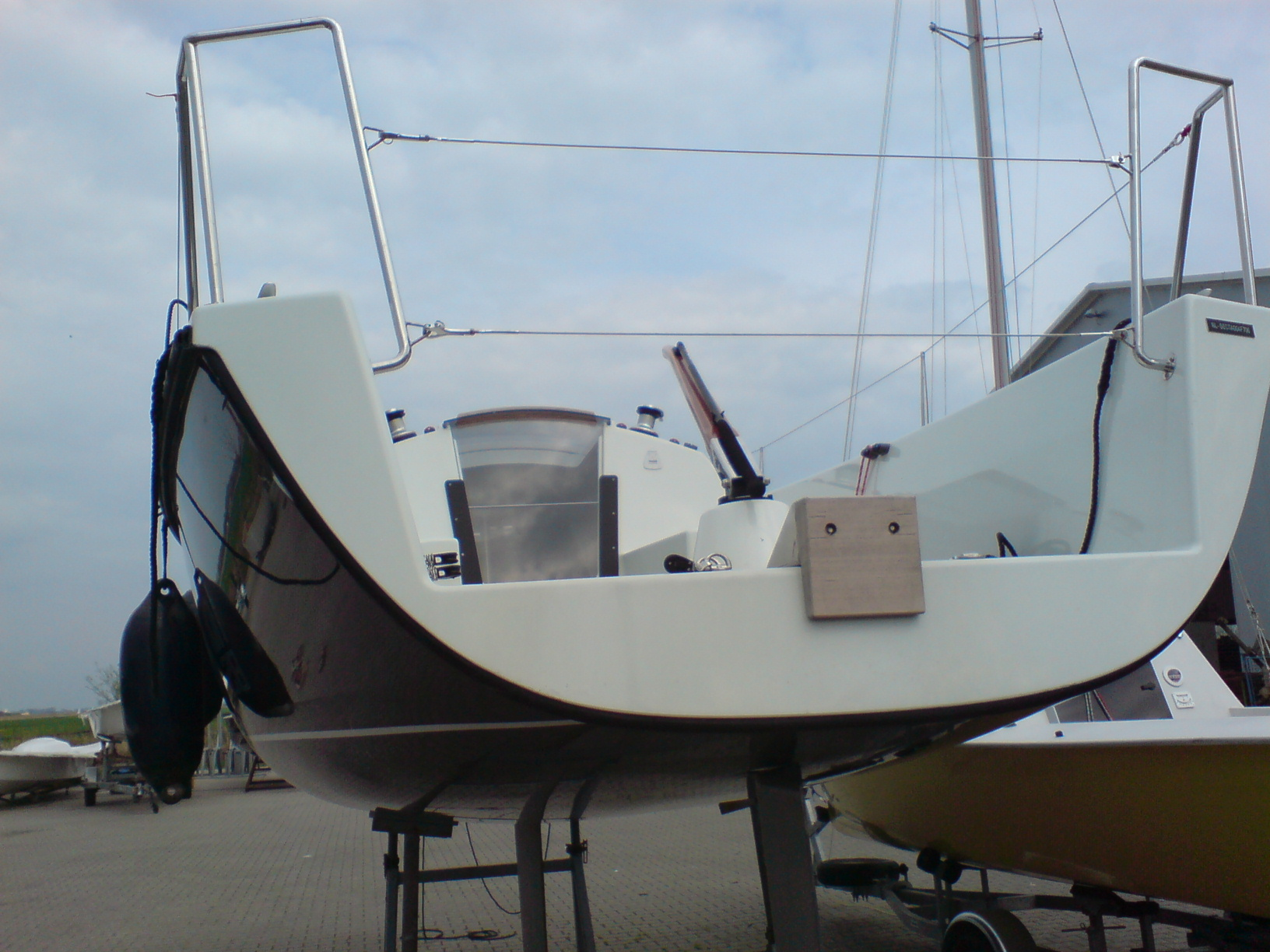
The self-bailing transom stern of a modern fiberglass sloop (Tirion28)

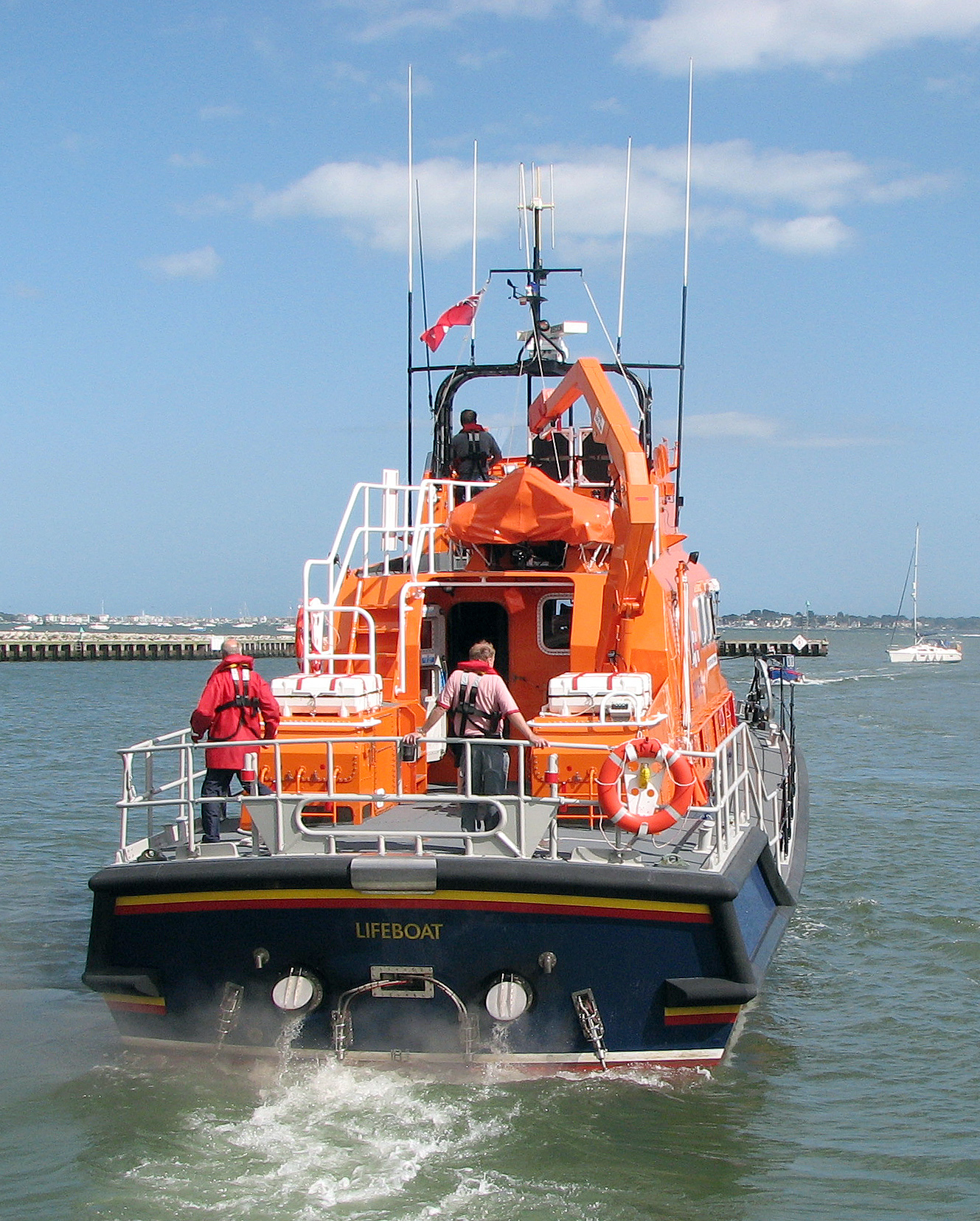
The transom stern of a UK Severn-class lifeboat

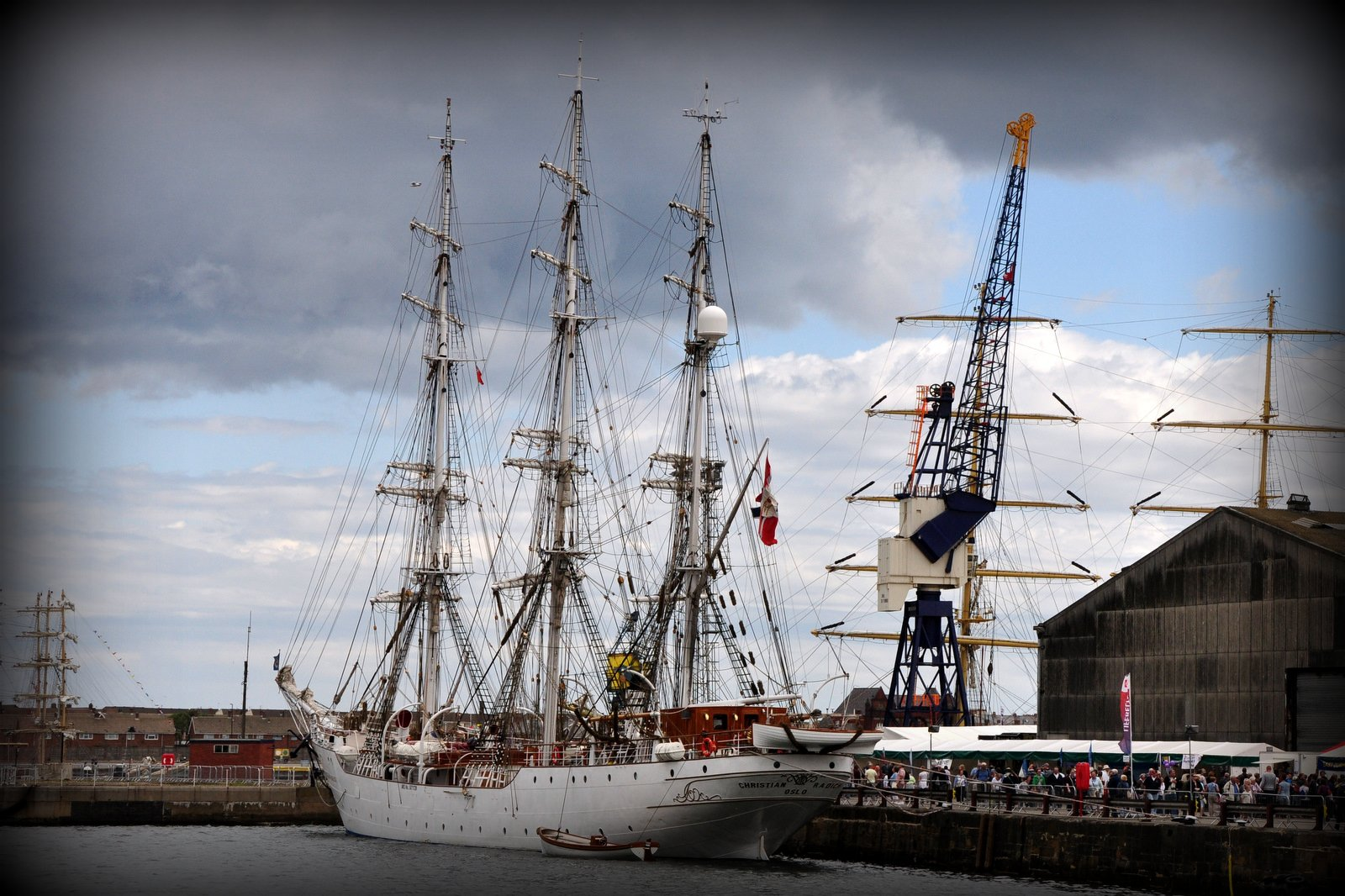
The full-rigged tall ship Christian Radich, showing her elliptical stern

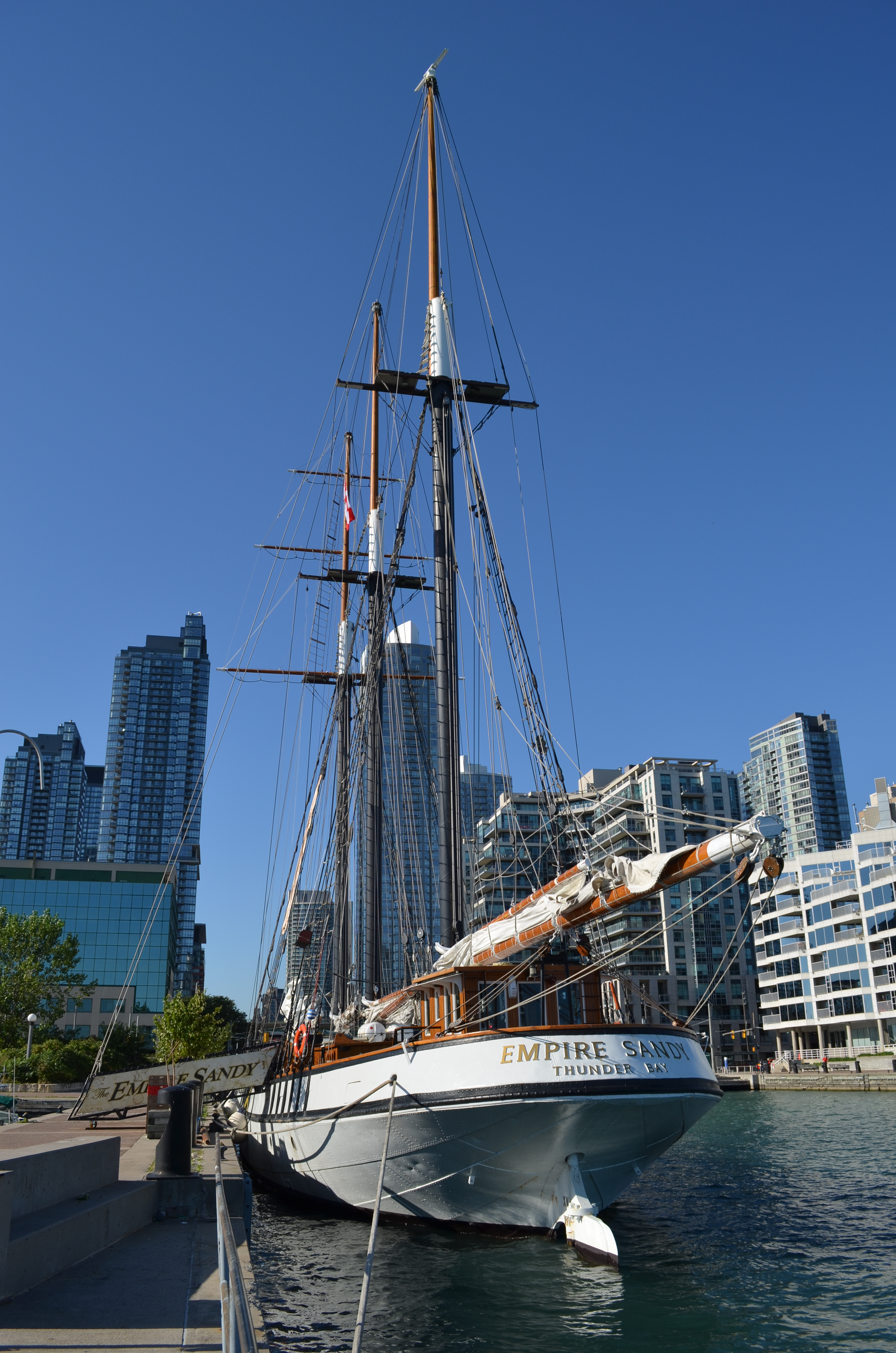
The elliptical stern of the metal-hulled three-masted schooner Empire Sandy
